= Patsy Jo Hilliard =

American educator (born 1937)

- Born: Patsy Jo Morrison; August 20, 1937 (age 89); Denver, Colorado, U.S.
- Education: Bachelor of interdisciplinary social sciences 1976
- Alma mater: San Francisco State University
- Occupations: Educator, Education Administrator, Mayor
- Spouse: Asa Grant Hilliard III

Patsy Jo Hilliard (b. August 20, 1937) is an African-American educator, education administrator, and the former mayor of East Point, Georgia. She was the first woman to be a member of the South San Francisco Unified School District and the first African-American woman mayor of East Point and the state of Georgia.

== Early life and education ==
Hilliard, née Patsy Jo Morrison, was born in Denver, Colorado, to parents Elmer Dudley Morrison II and Jessie Morrison. In 1955, she and her future husband, Asa Grant Hilliard III, graduated from Manual High School. She continued her education at Los Angeles State College in 1956 while working as a playground supervisor for the LA school system. Hilliard graduated from San Francisco State University with a B.A. in interdisciplinary social sciences in 1976. In 2008, she was honored with an honorary doctorate from Sojourner–Douglass College.

== Career ==
In 1964, Hilliard worked as a first grade teacher at Bright Functions School in Monrovia, Liberia as a volunteer for the American Women in Liberia organization. In 1975, Hillard was the first African-American women to work as a board member for the South San Francisco Unified School District.

In 1993, Hilliard became the first woman and African-American to be elected as mayor in the city of East Point, Georgia and in the state of Georgia. Hilliard served as mayor of East Point until 2006, longer than any other mayor of that town. Hilliard hosted the television talk show "In the Know with Patsy Jo" in 2007. Hilliard also served as the CEO of Waset Educational Production Company.

Hilliard has collaborated with a variety of groups throughout the course of her career, including the East Point Business Association, the Superintendents Advisory Board of the Fulton County School District, the Atlanta Airport Rotary Club, the Atlanta High Museum of Art, and the DeYoung Museum of Art. She has served as President of the Atlanta chapter of Links, Inc. and the Atlanta Alumnae chapter of Delta Sigma Theta sorority. She has also served on the Executive Board of the Atlanta chapter of the NAACP.

== Honors ==
Hilliard has earned many honors, including the SCLC's Drum Major for Justice Medal, the Delta Sigma Theta Sorority's Torch Award, and Alpha Kappa Alpha's Public Service Award. She has been inducted into the Atlanta Business League Women's Hall of Fame and has been named one of the 100 Most Influential Black Women over the last six years. Hilliard was selected as being one of the six mayors from the United States to join the fourth Japan-US Mayors Friendship Exchange Conference.

== Personal life ==
Hillard was married to Asa Grant Hillard III, an African American historian, until his death in 2007. They shared four children (Asa IV, Robi, Patricia and Hakim) and eight grandchildren (Maia, Terry, T'Shaka, Foluke, Xavier, Dayo, Shaidah and Asa Pearl).

== Works cited ==
- East Point Game Changers: Patsy Jo Hilliard (video). East Point TV. February 28, 2020.
- Bookhardt, Sylvia (n.d.). "Equity and Engagement". Denver Public Schools. African American Education Network.
- "The Honorable Patsy Jo Hilliard". The HistoryMakers. July 15, 2010.
- "Notable Deltas". oocities.org. Delta Sigma Theta. n.d.
- "Georgia Former Mayor Will Become Honorary Citizen of Liberia at 2017 United For Liberia Gala". FrontPage Africa. 2017-09-21.
- "East Point Ga. Elects 1st Black, Female Mayor". Jet. 1992-12-14.
- Martin, C. Sunny (2002). Who's who in Black Atlanta. Who's Who Publishing Company. p. 77.
- Muhammad, Wall (2006-01-12). "Patsy Jo Hilliard steps down as mayor of East Point". Atlanta Voice – via Newspapers.com.
