= Asa Grant Hilliard III =

American psychologist

- Born: August 22, 1933; Galveston, Texas
- Died: August 13, 2007 (aged 73); Cairo, Egypt
- Education: University of Denver
- Occupations: Educator, psychologist, Egyptologist, and professor
- Spouse: Patsy Jo Hilliard

Asa G. Hilliard III (August 22, 1933 – August 13, 2007), also known as Nana Baffour Amankwatia II, was an African-American professor of educational psychology who worked on indigenous ancient African history (ancient Egyptian), culture, education and society. He was the Fuller E. Callaway Professor of Urban Education at Georgia State University, with joint appointments in the Department of Education Policy Studies and the Department of Educational Psychology and Special Education. Prior to his position at Georgia State, Hilliard served as the Dean of the School of Education at San Francisco State University in San Francisco, California.

== Career ==
In 1981, Hilliard introduced the concept of "Baseline Essays" (short stories "of the experience of a particular geo-cultural group within a particular academic area from earliest times to the present" ) to the Portland, Oregon school district. This resulted in a collection of essays advocating Afrocentrism, authored by "six scholars," known as the African-American Baseline Essays, which were adopted by the district in 1989.

Selected memberships: Alliance of Black School Educators, San Francisco Chapter founder; American Association of Colleges for Teacher Education, board; American Psychological Association, fellow, board of ethnic and minority affairs; Association for the Study of Classical African Civilizations, founding member, vice president; National Black Child Development Institute, founding board member.

Selected awards: Republic of Liberia, Knight Commander of the Humane Order of African Redemption, 1972; American Association of Colleges for Teachers, Thurgood Marshall Award for Excellence; American Association of Higher Education Black Caucus, Harold Delaney Exemplary Educational Leadership Award; American Educational Research Association, Distinguished Career Contribution Award, Research and Development Award for Excellence; honorary doctorates from DePaul University and Wheelock College. He was also the recipient of awards including the Outstanding Scholarship Award from the Association of Black Psychologists and the Distinguished Leadership Award from the Association of Teachers of Education. Hilliard was also a member of Omega Psi Phi fraternity.

== Personal life ==
Hilliard was married to Patsy Jo Hilliard, the first African American and the first female mayor of the City of East Point, Georgia, with whom he had four children (Asa IV, Robi, Patricia and Hakim) and eight grandchildren (Maia, Terry, T'Shaka, Foluke, Xavier, Dayo, Shaidah and Asa Pearl).

Hilliard's grandfather, Asa Grant Hilliard was a high school principal in Bay City, Texas, for whom the former Hilliard High School was named. His father, Asa Grant Hilliard II, was also a high school principal, who spent most of his teaching career in Tyler, Texas.

== Death ==
Hilliard was traveling with his wife and a tour group in Egypt in 2007 when he died unexpectedly of what was determined to be Malaria.

== Published work ==
- The Maroon Within Us: Selected Essays on African American Community Socialization
- SBA: The Reawakening of the African Mind
- Teaching/Learning Anti-Racism: A Developmental Approach (Paperback)
- The Teachings of Ptahhotep (Paperback)
- The Price They Paid: Desegregation in an African American Community (Paperback)
- Infusion of African & African American Content in the School Curriculum (Paperback)
- African Power: Affirming African Indigenous Socialization in the Face of the Culture Wars (Paperback)
- "Rx for Racism: Imperatives for America's Schools" (Article; Phi Delta Kappan April 1990)

== Selected works ==
=== Books ===
- The Intellectual Strengths of Black Children and Adolescents: A Challenge to Pseudo Science, Institute of Afrikan Research, 1974.
- (With others) From Ancient Africa to African-Americans Today, Portland Public Schools, 1983.
- (Editor, with Barbara Sizemore) Saving the African American Child, National Alliance of Black School Educators, 1984.
- (With Bettye M. Caldwell) What Is Quality Child Care? National Association for the Education of Young Children, 1985.
- (Editor, with Larry Williams and Nia Hilliard Damali) The Teachings of Ptahhotep: The Oldest Book in the World, Blackwood Press, 1987.
- Fifty Plus Essential References on the History of African People, Black Classic Press, 1993.
- The Maroon Within Us: Selected Essays on African American Community Socialization, Black Classic Press, 1995.
- (Editor) Testing African American Students, Third World Press, 1995.
- SBA: The Reawakening of the African Mind, rev. ed., Makare Publishing, 1998.
- African Power: Affirming African Indigenous Socialization in the Face of the Cultural Wars, Makare Publishing, 2002.
- (Editor, with Nefertari Patricia Hilliard-Nunn) True of Voice: The Poetry of Listervelt Middleton, Makare Publishing, 2003.
- (With Theresa Perry and Claude Steele) Young, Gifted, and Black: Promoting High Achievement Among African American Students, Beacon Press, 2003.

=== Book chapters ===
- “I.Q. Testing as the Emperor's New Clothes,” in Perspective on Bias in Mental Testing, ed. Cecil Reynolds and Robert E. Brown, Plenum Press, 1984, pp. 139–169.
- “Historical Perspectives of Black Families,” in Proceedings of the Black Family Summit, National Urban League, 1985.
- “Blacks in Antiquity: A Review,” in African Presence in Early Europe, ed. Ivan Van Sertima, Transaction, 1985, 2000.
- “Waset, the Eye of Ra and the Abode of Maat: The Pinnacle of Black Leadership in the Ancient World,” in Egypt Revisited, ed. Ivan Van Sertima, Transaction, 1991.
- “Mathematical Excellence for Cultural Minority Students: What Is the Problem?” in Prospects for School Mathematics: Seventy-Five Years of Progress, National Council of Teachers of Mathematics, 1995.
- “Race, Identity, Hegemony, and Education: What Do We Need to Know Now?” in Race and Education, ed. William Watkins, James Lewis, and Victoria Chou, Allyn & Bacon, 2001, pp. 7–33.
- “Language, Culture, and the Assessment of African American Children,” in The Skin We Speak: Thoughts on Language and Culture in the Classroom, ed. Lisa D. Delpit and Joanne Kilgour Dowdy, New Press, 2002.
- “If We Had the Will to See It Happen,” in Letters to the Next President: What We Can Do About the Real Crisis in Public Education, ed. Carl D. Glickman, Teachers College Press, 2004.
- “The Meaning of KMT (Ancient Egyptian) History for Contemporary African American Experience,” in Africana Legacy: Diasporic Studies in the Americas, ed. Cecily Barker McDaniel and Tekla Ali Johnson, Tapestry Press, 2006.

=== Periodicals ===
- “Psychological Factors Associated with Language in the Education of the African-American Child,” Journal of Negro Education, 1983, pp. 24–34.
- “The Cultural Unity of Black Africa: The Domains of Patriarchy and of Matriarchy in Classical Antiquity,” Journal of African Civilizations, 1986, pp. 102–109.
- “Back to Binet: The Case Against the Use of IQ Tests in the Schools,” Contemporary Education, 1990, pp. 184–189.
- “Do We Have the Will to Educate All Children?” Educational Leadership, 1991, pp. 31–36.
- “What Good Is This Thing Called Intelligence and Why Bother to Measure It?,” Journal of Black Psychology, 1994, pp. 430–44.
- “Excellence in Education versus High-Stakes Standardized Testing,” Journal of Teacher Education, 2000, pp. 293–304.

=== Video recordings ===
- Free Your Mind: Return to the Source, African Origins, Waset Education Productions, 1986.
- Testing and Tracking, National Association for the Education of Young Children, 1989.
- (With Ela Aktay) Cultural Diversity and Student Achievement: A Basic Necessity, Skylight Professional Development, 1999.
- First People, Our People: Ancient Egypt Revealed, MEE Productions, 2001.

=== Online ===
- "Cultural Pluralism in Education". Africa Within. Archived from the original on 15 March 2012.
- "The Standards Movement: Quality Control or Decoy?". Africa Within. Archived from the original on 15 April 2012.

== Sources ==
Atlanta Journal-Constitution, April 8, 1999, p. JD9; August 14, 2007, p. B5.

Atlanta Tribune: The Magazine, February 2006, p. 14.

Educational Leadership, May 1999, pp. 58–62.

Intervention in School & Clinic, November 2004, pp. 96–105.

New York Beacon, October 11–17, 2007, p. 23.

Washington Post, August 16, 2007, p. B7.

“Asa Hilliard Biography,” The History Makers, https://web.archive.org/web/20160304111347/http://www.thehistorymakers.com/biography/biography.asp?bioindex=552&category=EducationMakes (accessed November 15, 2007).

"Dr. Asa Grant Hilliard, III". Africa Within. Archived from the original on 15 April 2012.

“Dr. Asa G. Hilliard, III Biography,” College of Education, Georgia State University, https://web.archive.org/web/20100701013752/http://education.gsu.edu/main/1641.html (accessed November 15, 2007).

“Dr. Asa Grant Hilliard, III, Pan-Africanist, Educator, Historian and Psychologist, Has Passed from This Life,” Asa G. Hilliard, https://web.archive.org/web/20090511193405/http://www.asaghilliard.net/ (accessed November 15, 2007).

"Maintaining the Faith in Teachers' Ability to Grow: An Interview with Asa Hilliard". Africa Within. Archived from the original on 15 April 2012.

“Tribute to Dr. Asa Grant Hilliard III (1933-2007), " Black Britain, http://www.blackbritain.co.uk/feature/details/120/USA/ (accessed November 15, 2007).
