= African-American Baseline Essays =

- Author: Asa Grant Hilliard III (compiler)
- Language: English
- Series: PPS Geocultural Baseline Essay Series
- Subject: Multicultural education; African-American history and culture
- Genre: Educational essays
- Publisher: Portland Public Schools
- Publication date: 1987
- Publication place: United States
- Followed by: American Indian, Hispanic-American, Asian-American Baseline Essays

The African-American Baseline Essays are a series of educational materials commissioned in 1987 by the Portland public school district in Portland, Oregon, and compiled by Asa Grant Hilliard III, intended to "provide information about the history, culture, and contributions of Africans and African-Americans in the disciplines of Art, Language Arts, Mathematics, Science, Social Studies, and Music," to "be used by teachers and other District staff as a reference and resource just as adopted textbooks and other resources are used" as part of "a huge multicultural curriculum-development effort."

== History ==
Despite criticism of their inaccuracies and "Egypt-centric" outlook, the Baseline Essays were widely adopted in the early 90s by large school districts throughout the United States.

Since the debut of the African-American Baseline Essays, three other series have been released as part of the "PPS Geocultural Baseline Essay Series," focused around "American Indians," "Hispanic-Americans," and "Asian-Americans."

== Criticism ==
Their inclusion of the essay "African and African-American Contributions to Science and Technology" by Hunter Havelin Adams III was criticized in particular for promoting pseudoscientific ideas like astrology, psychokinesis, and "psychoenergetics" as "Egyptian science." Adams' essay is referenced in the article behind the Sokal affair; in light of this the Baseline Essays themselves have sometimes been called a hoax, but they are still available on the Portland Public Schools web site.
