= Robert Hastings =

Robert or Bob Hastings may refer to:

- Bob Hastings (1925–2014), American actor
- Robert F. Hastings (1914–1973), American architect based in Detroit
- Robert Hastings (ufologist) (born 1950), American ufologist
- Robert T. Hastings Jr., American public relations professional
- Robert Hastings Hunkins (1774–1853), American politician and early settler in Wisconsin
