= National Museum of the American People =

Museum

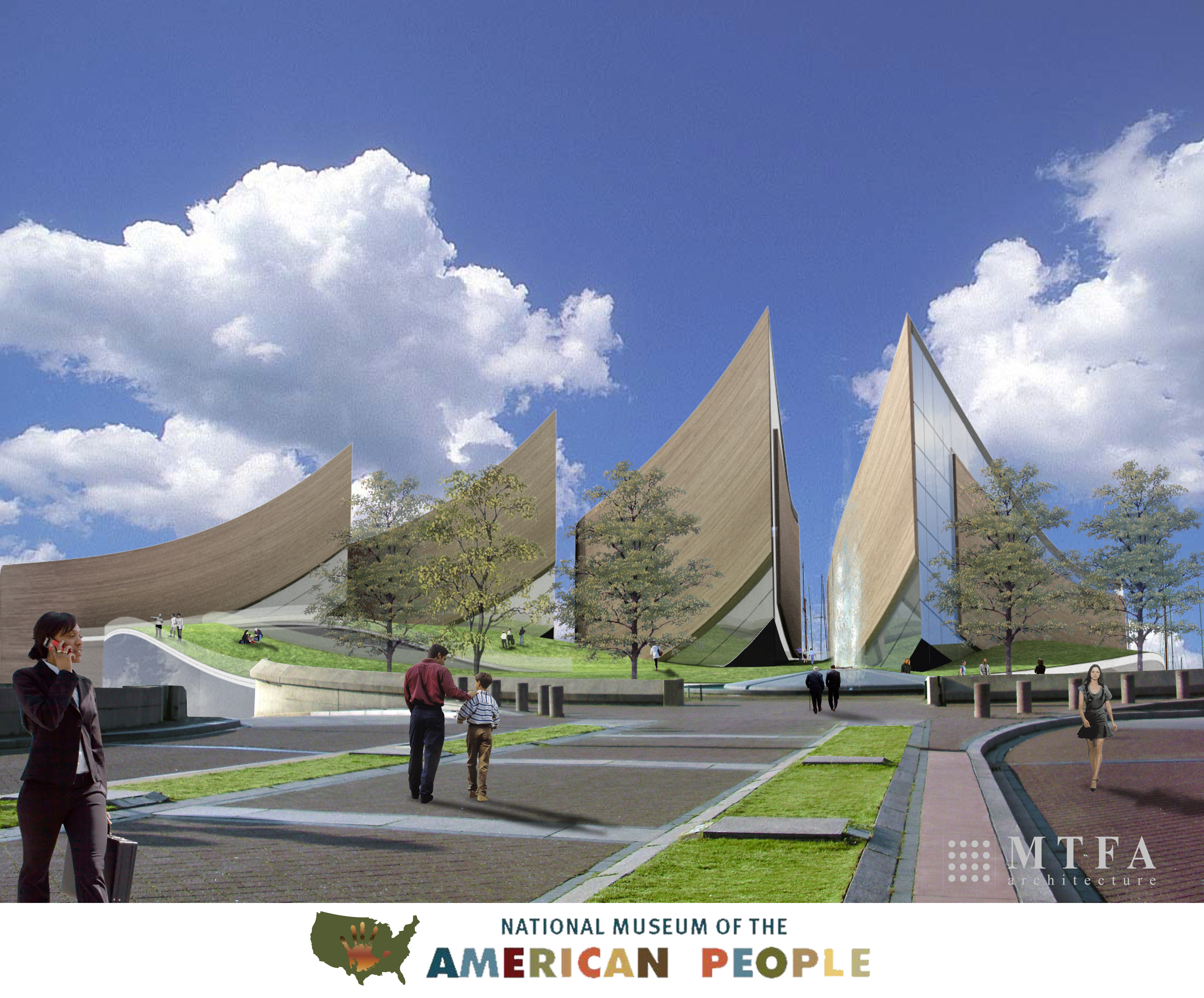
A proposed design of the National Museum of the American People at the Banneker Overlook site in Washington, D.C. at the south end of L'Enfant Promenade Design concept by MTFA Architecture.

The National Museum of the American People is a proposed museum to be built in Washington, D.C. Its plan is to tell the story about the making of the American People including the migration and immigration stories of all Americans. The National Museum of the American People would use the museum story-telling approach used by the United States Holocaust Memorial Museum and the National Museum of African American History and Culture.

== Overview ==
Proposed by the Coalition for the National Museum of the American People, composed of more than 250 ethnic, nationality and genealogical private non-profit organizations as of 2019, the museum "will tell the story of every American ethnic and cultural group coming to this land and nation from every corner of the world, from the first people through today." The museum also has the support of 19 organizations that focus on refugees and immigration including the United States Conference of Catholic Bishops Secretariat of Cultural Diversity in the Church, National Association of Evangelicals and Church World Service.

== History ==
The Coalition for the National Museum of the American People was created by Sam Eskenazi, former Director of Public Information for the United States Holocaust Memorial Museum. The concept for the museum originated in the late 90s when Eskenazi was passing the USDA Headquarters Building, the only office building on the National Mall. Eskenazi asked and answered a question to himself:

"If this were a museum, what kind of museum could it be?" The answer: a museum that would tell the stories of all of the peoples coming to this land. I came up with a name for the museum on the spot - the National Museum of the American People. It is a testament to the need for the museum that many people, when told about the proposal, were surprised that such a museum doesn't already exist.

On September 11, 2008, Congressman Maurice Hinchey introduced a bill, H.R. 6883, into the 110th United States Congress to "establish a commission to study the establishment of the National Museum of the American People...". Eskenazi then started a coalition of private not-for-profit ethnic and nationality groups to support the creation of the museum in 2009. The organization announced this project at a press event in February, 2011 and began gathering support in Congress. Beginning that year, Rep. Jim Moran, Sen. Brian Schatz and various cosponsors have introduced into the United States Congress legislation that would support a bipartisan study on the creation of such a museum without using any federal taxpayer funds. Shortly thereafter the Washington City Paper named it the "Best Museum That Doesn't Exist Yet" in the newspaper's "Best Of D.C. 2011" issue.

In May 2011, Congressman Jim Moran agreed to be the originating sponsor of a resolution calling for a study group, expressing concerns about balkanization of the National Mall. In partnership with Eskenazi's Coalition for the National Museum of the American People, Moran introduced into the 112th United States Congress on July 7, 2011, a concurrent resolution, H. Con. Res. 63, "supporting the formation of a bipartisan Presidential Commission to study the establishment of a National Museum of the American People". On March 19, 2013, Moran reintroduced the resolution H. Con. Res. 27 into the 113th Congress. It had 48 bipartisan sponsors. In 2015, Senator Brian Schatz introduced a similar resolution into the Senate.

Location planning is limited by the lack of available locations in the central Washington, DC area, whether for the NMAP or another museum. One site proposed for the museum is an overlook at the south end of L'Enfant Promenade that now contains the National Park Service's Benjamin Banneker Park, a half mile (800 m) south of the Smithsonian Institution's Castle Building on the National Mall.

== Museum contents and exhibitions ==
Logo of the Coalition for the National Museum of the American People

The museum project creators have proposed a number of components to be considered for a final institution. Among these are a permanent exhibition (tentatively called The Story of the American People), a Center for the Advanced Study of the American People drawing upon a group of over 145 scholars who have offered their support to the project, a National Genealogical Center, an Education and Resource Center and an archival library of American Migration and Immigration.

In addition, the permanent collection is intended to be presented in a narrative manner, told in four chapters:

Chapter I, The First Peoples Come, 20,000 before present (est.)-1607
Chapter II, The Nation Takes Form, 1607-1820
Chapter III, The Great In-Gathering, 1820-1924
Chapter IV, And Still They Come, 1924–present
