= Fyfe Building =

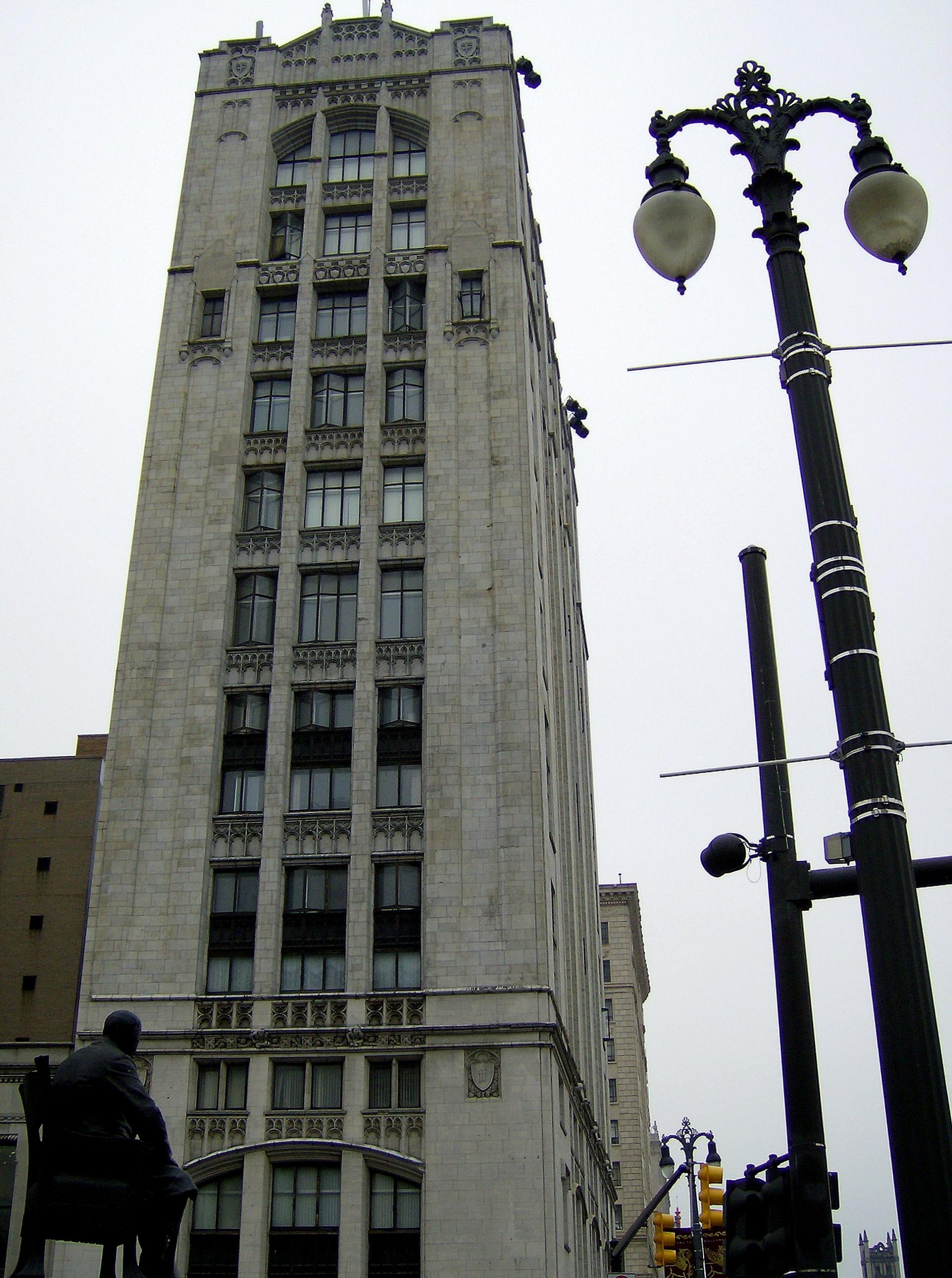
- Interactive map of the Fyfe Building area

General information
- Type: Residential
- Architectural style: Gothic Revival
- Location: 10 West Adams Street; Detroit, Michigan
- Coordinates: 42.33709°N 83.0513°W
- Construction started: 1916
- Completed: 1919

Height
- Roof: 177 ft (54 m)

Technical details
- Floor count: 14

Design and construction
- Architect: Smith, Hinchman & Grylls

Other information
- Public transit: Grand Circus Park; Grand Circus; SMART FAST Woodward 461, 462; DDOT 4 D2A2

The Fyfe Building is located at 10 West Adams Street, at the corner of Adams Street and Woodward Avenue in Downtown Detroit, Michigan. It faces onto Central United Methodist Church, and Grand Circus Park.

== Description ==
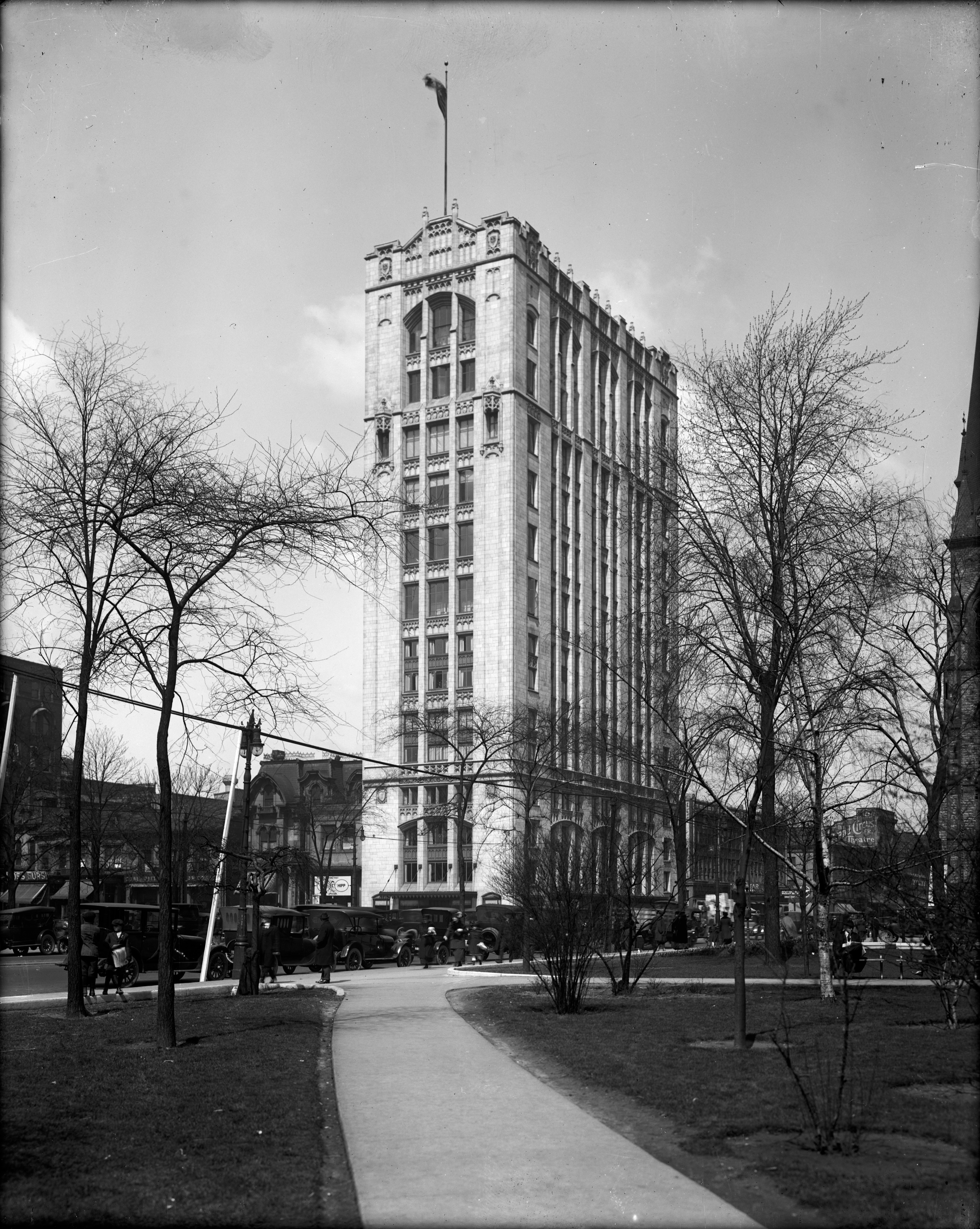
Fyfe Building, c. 1920

The high-rise building was constructed between 1916 and 1919, and is one of Detroit's oldest; it was designed by Smith, Hinchman & Grylls in the Gothic Revival architectural style. It stands at 14 floors, and has 65 residential units.

The building was named after Richard H. Fyfe, a Detroit merchant who made his fortune in the shoe trade. For many years it had a Fyfe shoe store at the retail street level and offices in the upper stories; at the time of its opening, the shoe store was the largest in the country. The building is now mainly used as a residential building, but has some retail and a bar at street level.

The building was nearly demolished in the mid-1990s to make way for parking for Comerica Park.

- Owner: PEM Investments, LLC
