= Robert F. Hastings =

American architect (1914–1973)

- Born: December 20, 1914; Kenosha, Wisconsin
- Died: December 21, 1973 (aged 59); Detroit
- Occupation: Architect
- Awards: Fellow of the American Institute of Architects
- Practice: Smith, Hinchman & Grylls

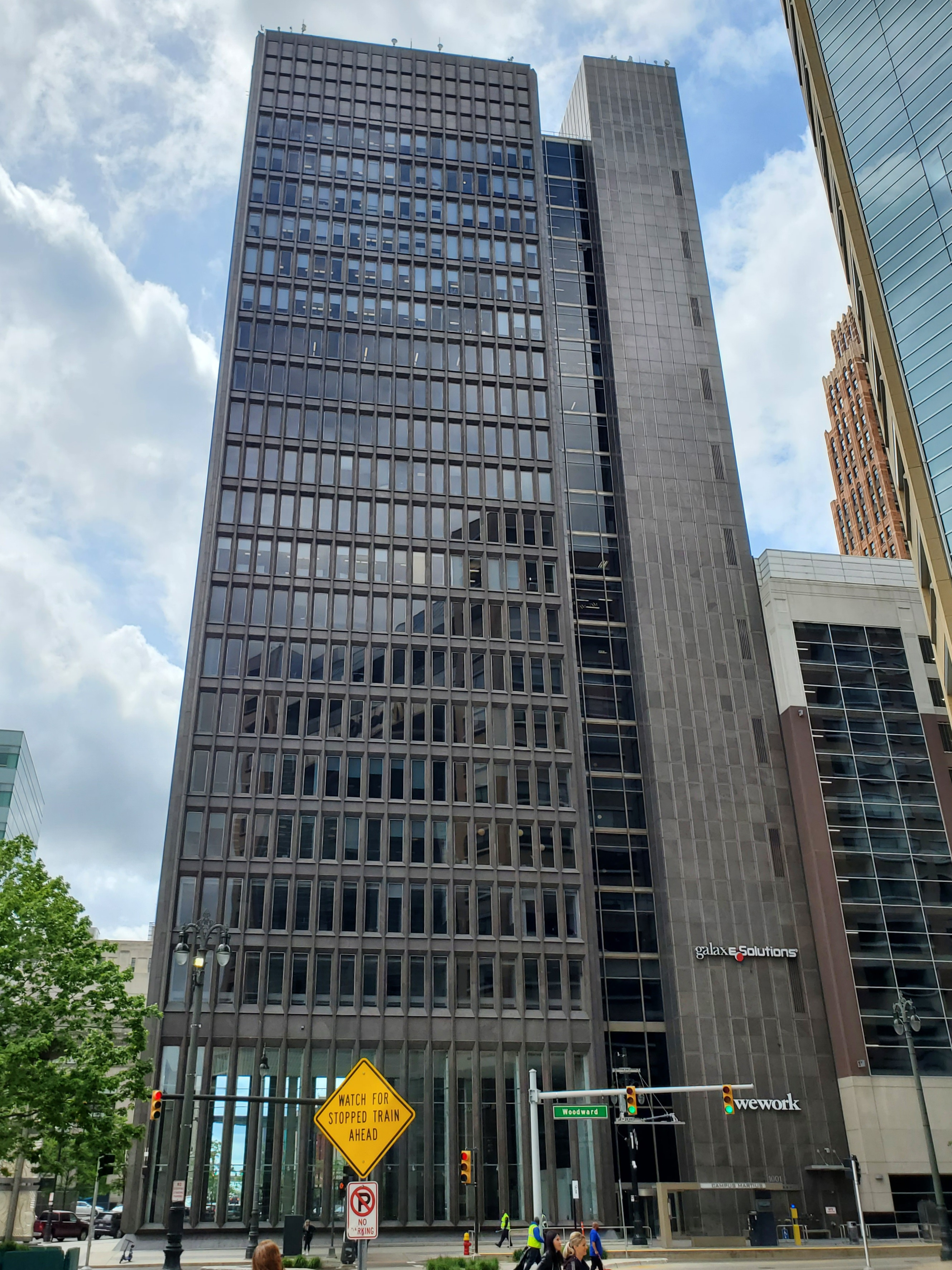
The First Federal Building in Detroit, designed by Smith, Hinchman & Grylls and completed in 1965.

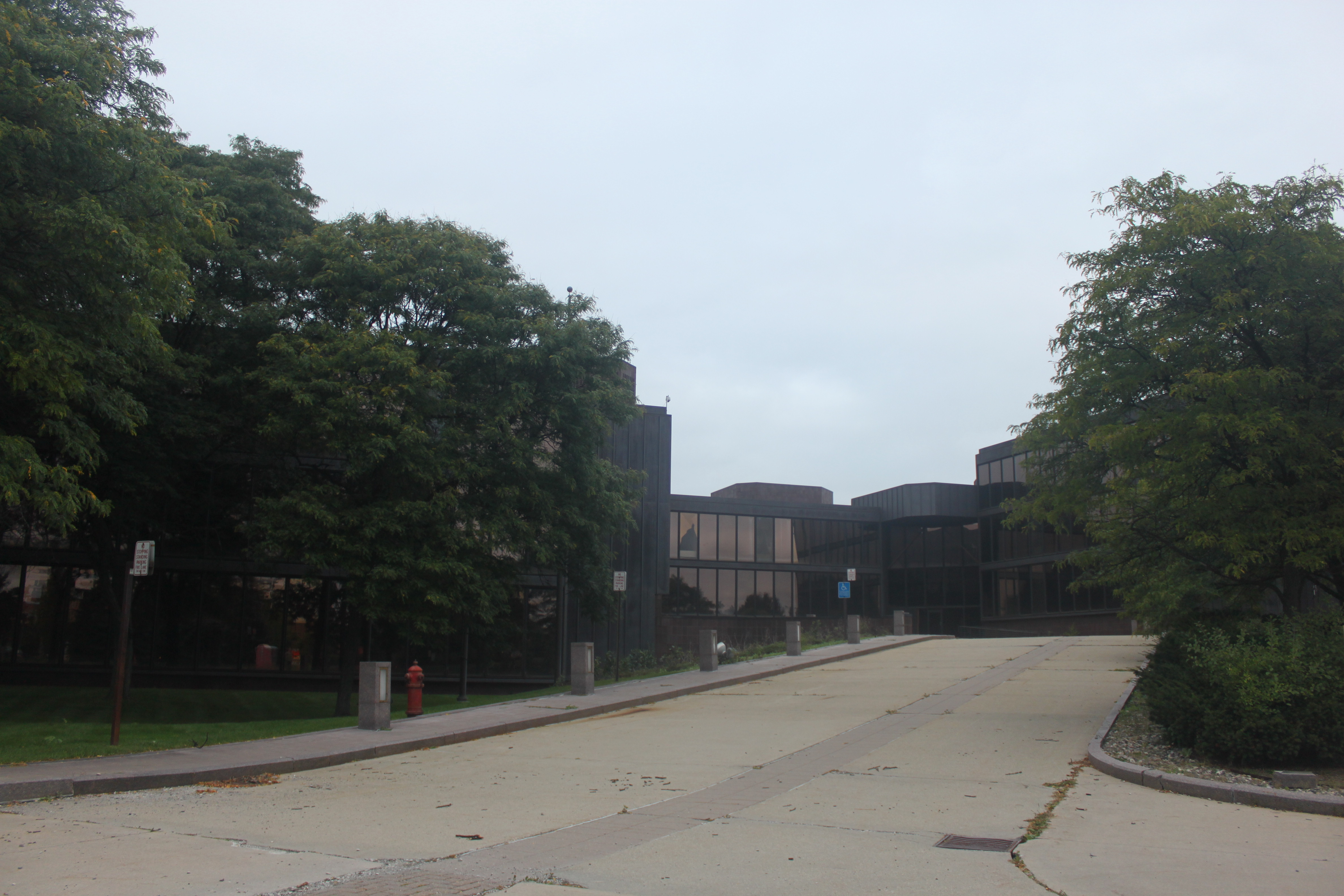
The former S. S. Kresge Corporation headquarters in Troy, completed in 1972.

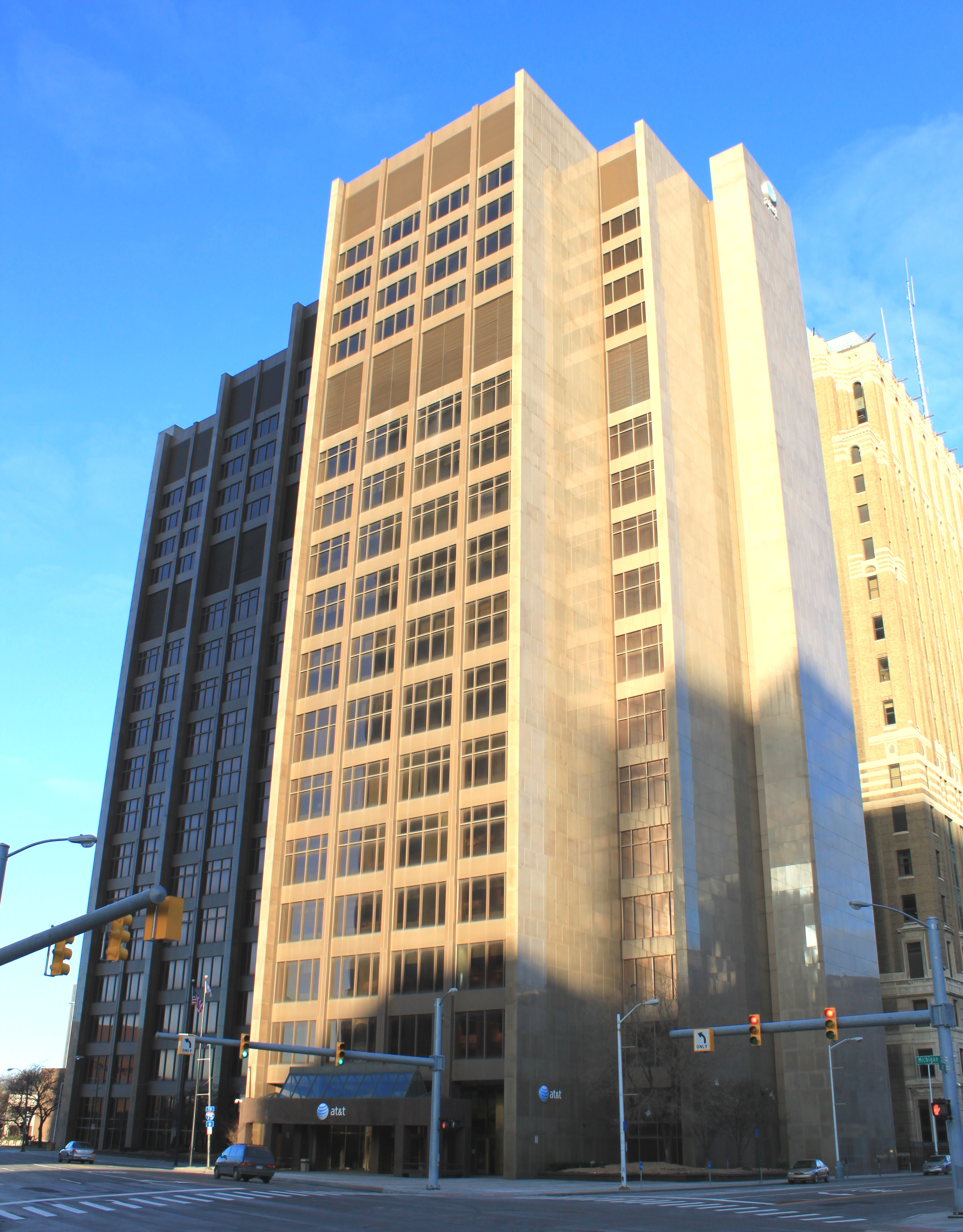
The AT&T Michigan Headquarters addition in Detroit, completed in 1974.

Robert F. Hastings FAIA (1914–1973) was an American architect in practice in Detroit. He spent his entire career with Smith, Hinchman & Grylls, now SmithGroup, and was its president from 1960 to 1971 and chair from 1971 to 1973. He was president of the American Institute of Architects for the year 1971.

== Life and career ==
Robert Frank Hastings was born December 20, 1914, in Kenosha, Wisconsin, to John Frank Hastings and Bernice (Stretch) Hastings. He enrolled in the University of Wisconsin before transferring to the University of Illinois, graduating in 1937 with a degree in architectural engineering. After graduating he joined the Detroit architectural firm of Smith, Hinchman & Grylls. With the exception of two years during World War II when he worked as an airframe stress analyst, he spent his entire career with the firm. In 1950 he was appointed to the firm's board of directors, and was elected vice president in 1951. He also served as assistant treasurer, executive vice president and treasurer before being elected president in 1960. He worked in this role until 1971, when he stepped down as president to serve as chair of the board.

Hastings developed Smith, Hinchman & Grylls into one of the largest A–E firms in the United States and was noted for bringing modern business practices, including the use of computers, into the firm. Under his leadership branch offices were opened in Louisville, Kentucky, Toronto and Buenos Aires. Some major works of the firm where Hastings had a prominent role include the General Motors Technical Center, designed in association with Eero Saarinen and the First Federal Building in Detroit. In Lansing, Hastings led the firm in its master planning of the area surrounding the Michigan State Capitol and the design of several large state office buildings. The plan also proposed to build a new capitol several blocks west of the existing one, though this element was rejected in favor of remodeling the existing capitol.

Outside of his professional practice Hastings was deeply concerned with the decline of Detroit. As a director of the Metropolitan Chamber of Commerce and New Detroit, Inc., Hastings worked to reverse the migration to the suburbs and to bring new investment into Detroit proper. His accomplishments in this area include the development of Philip A. Hart Plaza, designed by his office and completed in 1975, two years after his death. His efforts to revitalize Detroit was reflected in the operations of the firm itself. While many businesses, including architectural firms, were leaving the urban core, Hastings kept the firm in the city, completing a purpose–designed headquarters building, the Cass Building, at 455 West Fort Street in 1972. The firm remained there until moving into the Guardian Building in the 1990s.

Hastings joined the American Institute of Architects in 1946 as a member of the Detroit chapter. He served as chapter president for 1958–60 and in 1963 was elected to the national board of directors. After also serving as treasurer and vice president, in 1969 he was elected first vice president/president elect for 1969–70 and president for the year 1971. As president Hastings began the construction of the present AIA headquarters and led the computerization of the organization's records.

Hastings was elected a Fellow in 1961 and after his presidency was elected to honorary membership in the College of Architects of Bolivia, the Royal Architectural Institute of Canada, the Society of Architects of Mexico and the College of Architects of Venezuela.

== Personal life ==
Hastings was married in 1937 to Laverne Helen Wegner of Kenosha. They had two daughters and lived in suburban Birmingham. Hastings died December 21, 1973, the day after his 59th birthday, of a heart attack on the sidewalk outside of his Detroit office.

== Legacy ==
One building designed by Hastings, the First Federal Building, has been listed on the United States National Register of Historic Places. In 1978 the Detroit chapter of the AIA established the Robert F. Hastings Award, given annually in recognition of exceptional service to the profession.

== Architectural works ==
Under Hastings' leadership, Smith, Hinchman & Grylls grew into one of the largest firms in the United States and completed many hundreds of buildings. Some projects where Hastings had a prominent role include:

- General Motors Technical Center, (Note: As associate architects with Eero Saarinen, primary designer for the complex.) GM Tech Center Rd, Warren, Michigan (1949–55, NRHP 2000, NHL 2014)
- Sperry–Farragut plant (former), Vance Tank Rd, Bristol, Tennessee (1954)
- Thompson Products plant, Detroit (1955, unlocated)
- Hiram Walker warehouses, Peoria, Illinois (1955, unlocated)
- Wixom Assembly Plant, Wixom Rd, Wixom, Michigan (1957, demolished 2012)
- First Federal Building, 1001 Woodward Ave, Detroit (1963–65, NRHP 2013)
- Belvidere Assembly Plant, 3000 W Chrysler Dr, Belvidere, Illinois (1964–65)
- North Terminal, Detroit Metropolitan Airport, Romulus, Michigan (1967, demolished)
- IBM Boulder Campus, 6300 Diagonal Hwy, Boulder, Colorado (1967)
- Murray D. Van Wagoner Building, 425 W Ottawa St, Lansing, Michigan (1967)
- Richard H. Austin Building, 430 W Allegan St, Lansing, Michigan (1968)
- G. Mennen Williams Building, 525 W Ottawa St, Lansing, Michigan (1968)
- Building 36 and Building 37, National Institutes of Health, Bethesda, Maryland (1969, demolished)
- University of Louisville Health Science Campus, Louisville, Kentucky (1970)
- Cass Building remodeling, 455 W Fort, Detroit (1972)
- S. S. Kresge Corporation headquarters, 3100 W Big Beaver Rd, Troy, Michigan (1972)
- AT&T Michigan Headquarters addition, 444 Michigan Ave, Detroit (1973–74)
