= Hamilton Anderson Associates =

American design firm

- Company type: Private
- Industry: Architecture, Urban Planning, Landscape Architecture, Interior Design
- Founder: Rainy Hamilton Jr. Kent Anderson
- Headquarters: 1435 Randolph Street #200, Detroit, Michigan, United States
- Area served: National
- Website: https://www.hamilton-anderson.com/

Hamilton Anderson Associates (HAA) is a Detroit-based, multi-disciplinary design firm founded in 1994 dedicated to improving the built environment through creative, contemporary design. HAA was founded by Rainy Hamilton Jr. and Kent Anderson, who developed the business of integrating architecture and site design as the basis of producing urban design solutions, including architecture, landscape architecture, planning, interiors and urban design. Located in Paradise Valley in downtown Detroit, HAA is one of the largest African-American owned architectural firms in the United States.

== Projects ==
- DTE Energy Co. Navitas House: HAA was selected as the Architecture Firm of Record for the redesign of the Navitas House, which is an old Salvation Army building in Detroit that now holds 140 DTE Energy information technology employees.
- Ronald McDonald House: This $4.3 million dollar project, which was completed in 2015, relocated and redesigned the Ronald McDonald House Charities of Southeastern Michigan. The renovation is 10,000 square-feet larger than the previous location and includes décor supplied by the Detroit Red Wings.
- Orleans Landing: First housing on the East Riverfront in downtown Detroit. HAA served as Architect of Record.
- Brush Park: This $70 million dollar project preserved four historic homes and created new, contemporary housing in Detroit’s Brush Park district. HAA served as Master Planner, Site Designer and Architect on three of the buildings for the development. HAA took an approach of having north and south streets feature apartments and retail while the east and west streets consist of townhomes and mansions, totaling 400 new units.
- Wayne State University Anthony Wayne Apartments: HAA announced in 2017 that it will be aiding in design and building of the Anthony Wayne Apartments – Wayne State University’s on-campus housing. The structure will include one-, two- and four-bedroom units, event and study rooms and commercial businesses on its first floor for a total unit count over 800.
- MGM National Harbor: MGM International Resorts selected HAA to serve as the Associate Architect of Record for its casino resort, located at National Harbor in the Washington, D.C. area. HAA was responsible for the casino floor, back-of-house spaces, as well as assisting in the early stage planning of the resort’s Conservatory and overall unique, linear layout.
- Paradise Valley Cultural & Entertainment District (PVCED): Paradise Valley, once known as Black Bottom in Detroit, is getting redeveloped with an investment of $52.4 million. This construction includes establishing the Paradise Valley Cultural and Entertainment Conservancy to honor the tradition of jazz and African American culture. HAA will own and renovate its headquarters in the district and construct a 16,000 square-feet contemporary addition that will be home to Hamilton Anderson Associates.
- Little Caesar’s Arena: Associate Architect
- Motown Historical Museum: Major addition to house the Motown collection with interactive displays and renovation and preservation of historic homes that Motown executives and artists used to produce the original Motown Sound. HAA serves as the Architect of Record.
- Hudson Building Site Redevelopment: HAA teamed up with New York-based architecture firm SHoP to work on designing the new building for the former Hudson’s Department Store site. The previous structure was demolished in 1997 and the site was not in use until Dan Gilbert, through Bedrock, purchased the property in 2016 with plans to build a mixed-use retail and residential complex.
- Detroit Works Project: In 2012, HAA was selected to help lead a long-term urban planning initiative for the city of Detroit.
