= Rosa Sheng =

American architect

Rosa T. Sheng
- Born: June 7, 1971 (age 55); Taiwan
- Education: Syracuse University
- Occupation: Architect
- Practice: Smithgroup

Rosa T. Sheng is an architect based in San Francisco, California. She is a Fellow of the American Institute of Architects. After a career at Bohlin Cywinski Jackson, she joined SmithGroup as a principal in 2017, where she heads the firm's Equity, Diversity and Inclusion Program. Sheng was president of the American Institute of Architects San Francisco, the first Asian American Woman to serve in this role in the organization’s 136 years. She is the founding chair of Equity by Design (formerly known as The Missing 32%), originating author of AIA Resolution 15-1 Equity in Architecture, a member of the AIA Equity in Architecture Commission, and a frequent speaker, writer, and campaigner for equity and inclusion.

== Early life and education ==
Sheng graduated from Syracuse University with a Bachelor in Architecture.

== Career ==
=== Architectural practice ===
Sheng spent 20 years as an architect at Bohlin Cywinski Jackson in San Francisco, where she was responsible for a number of projects as designer, project manager and project architect. Her work on Apple stores in New York and San Francisco led to a patented glass stair design. Other notable projects include: Pixar Animation Studios, Emeryville, California (2001); the Lorry I. Lokey Graduate School of Business, Mills College, Oakland, California (2009); and California Avenue New Lecture Hall, University of California, Davis (2014).

She is currently a Principal of SmithGroup, San Francisco, where she specializes in active learning, university design, and workplace design, and is Director of Equity, Diversity + Inclusion for practice.

=== Advocacy for social change ===
In 2013, Sheng founded Equity By Design as an AIA San Francisco Committee to build a platform of community support for change in the profession. Equity by Design conducts surveys about working conditions in architecture, disseminates research findings, and shares resources about equitable practice. She has also led or advised AIA initiatives including the AIA Equity in Architecture Commission, AIA Women's Leadership Summit, and AIA Diversity Council.

== Awards ==
- Beverly Willis Foundation Leadership Award, 2017
