= Cass Building =

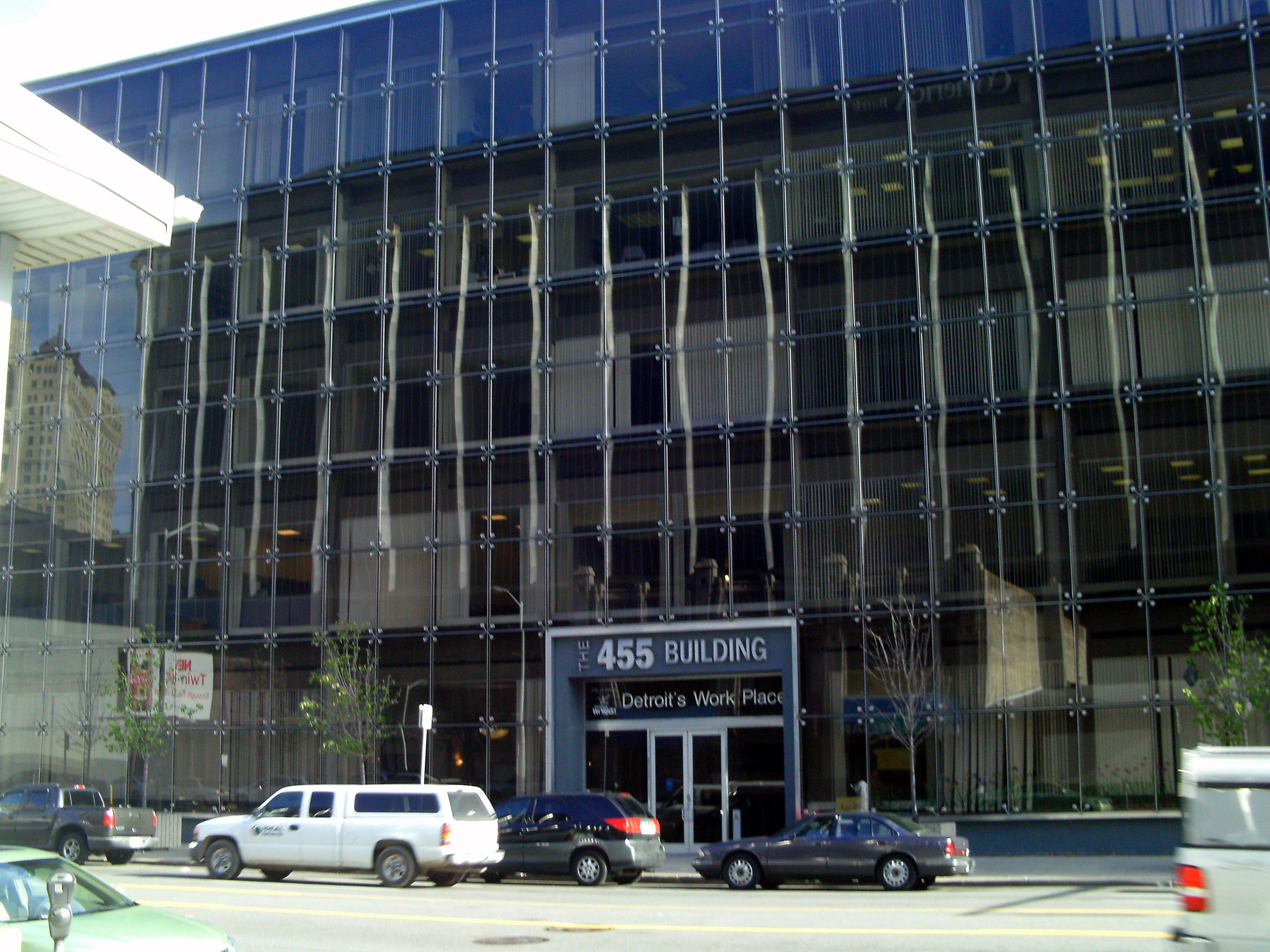
- Interactive map of the Cass Building area

General information
- Type: office
- Architectural style: International Style
- Location: 455 W. Fort Street; Detroit, Michigan
- Coordinates: 42.3286°N 83.0515°W

Technical details
- Floor count: 5

Design and construction
- Architect: Smith Hinchman & Grylls

The Cass Building is a low-rise office building at 455 West Fort Street, at the southeast corner of First Street, in Detroit, Michigan. It is also known as Detroit's Work Place.

== Description ==
The building was designed in 1910 by the architectural firm of Smith, Hinchman and Grylls as a warehouse on the western edge of the city's central business district. In 1972, the reinforced concrete building was purchased by the firm and remodeled as its new headquarters. The structure was stripped to its shell and new exterior walls constructed. The north and west facades were covered with tinted glass in a specially designed framing system that is almost invisible at first glance. The edges of the panes of glass comprise the wall abut giving the appearance of one sheet with no support. Four adjacent panes are fastened at their corners by an x-shaped bracket.

The architectural firm relocated its offices in the early 1990s and the structure currently is unoccupied.

Detroit People Mover Station Fort/Cass is one-block east across Fort Street from the building and Cobo Center is one block south.
