= SmithGroup =

American architecture firm

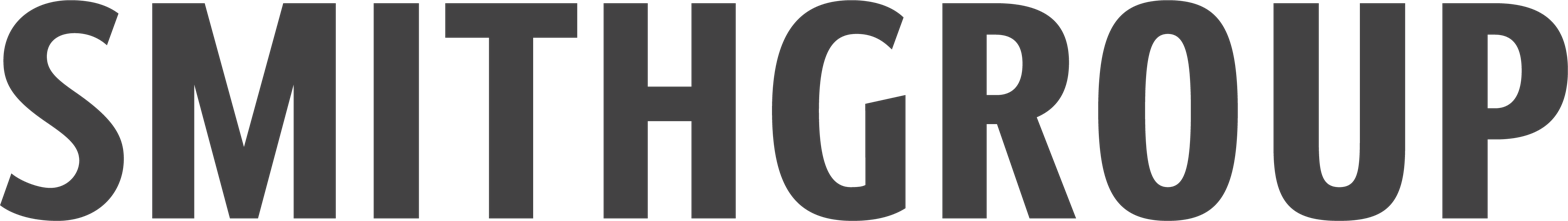
- Industry: Architecture
- Founded: 1853; 173 years ago
- Founder: Sheldon Smith
- Revenue: 354,000,000 United States dollar (2023)
- Number of employees: 1,500 (2024)
- Website: www.smithgroup.com

SmithGroup is an international architectural, engineering and planning firm. Established in 1853 by architect Sheldon Smith, SmithGroup is the longest continually operating architecture and engineering firm in the United States that is not a wholly owned subsidiary. As of 2025, SmithGroup ranks #7 among the top 100 architecture engineering firms according to Building Design + Construction, with offices in 21 cities around the United States. The firm serves a range of clients, including cities, commercial, higher education, healthcare, science & technology, and cultural markets.

== History ==
SmithGroup was founded in 1853 by Sheldon Smith, a self-taught architect. He opened an office in Ohio, and his first credited project was a hotel in Sandusky, Ohio later that year. In 1855, Smith moved the firm to Detroit. Smith's son Mortimer became a partner in the firm in 1861, and took over for his father after the latter's death in 1869. Mortimer's son Fred joined the firm in 1881, and led the firm after Mortimer's death in 1896. At this time, Fred brought in two University of Michigan College of Engineering graduates, Henry G. Field and Theodore H. Hinchman, Jr. The firm's name was changed to Field, Hinchman & Smith in 1903.

In 1907, H.J. Maxwell Grylls, a British-trained architect, joined the firm, and the name changed to Smith, Hinchman and Grylls (SH+G). In the 1920s, Smith, Hinchman and Grylls, and architect Wirt C. Rowland, designed some of Detroit’s most notable skyscrapers. In 1945, Minoru Yamasaki, American architect best known for designing the original World Trade Center, joined the firm as Director of Design.

Later years saw Smith, Hinchman and Grylls merge with other firms. In 1971, the firm merged with Johnson, Johnson & Roy (JJR), expanding the firm’s capabilities in landscape architecture, civil engineering and environmental science. In 1996, Smith, Hinchman and Grylls merged with the Washington DC firm of Keyes, Lethbridge & Condon and in 1998 they merged with Stone Marraccini & Patterson of San Francisco and Los Angeles. In 2000, Tobey + Davis, Reston, Virginia, joined Smith, Hinchman and Grylls.

In 2000, the firm changed its name to SmithGroup.

Additional growth took place in 2009 with the acquisition of Dallas-based F&S Partners, the 2018 acquisition of Boston-based TRO and Denver-based Paulien & Associates in 2019.

== Notable staff ==
Notable architects and engineers from the firm include Wilfred Armster, C. Howard Crane, David DiLaura, Rainy Hamilton Jr., Robert F. Hastings, Julius Goldman, William Kapp, Wirt C. Rowland, Rosa T. Sheng and Minoru Yamasaki.

== Gallery ==
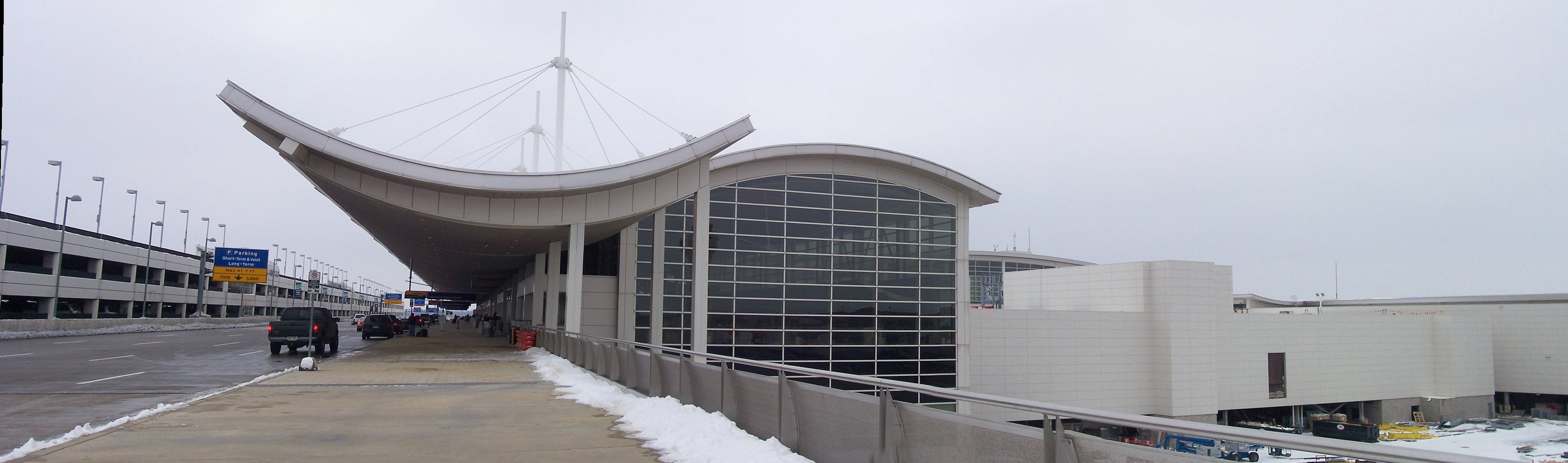
Edward H. McNamara Terminal Detroit Metropolitan Airport

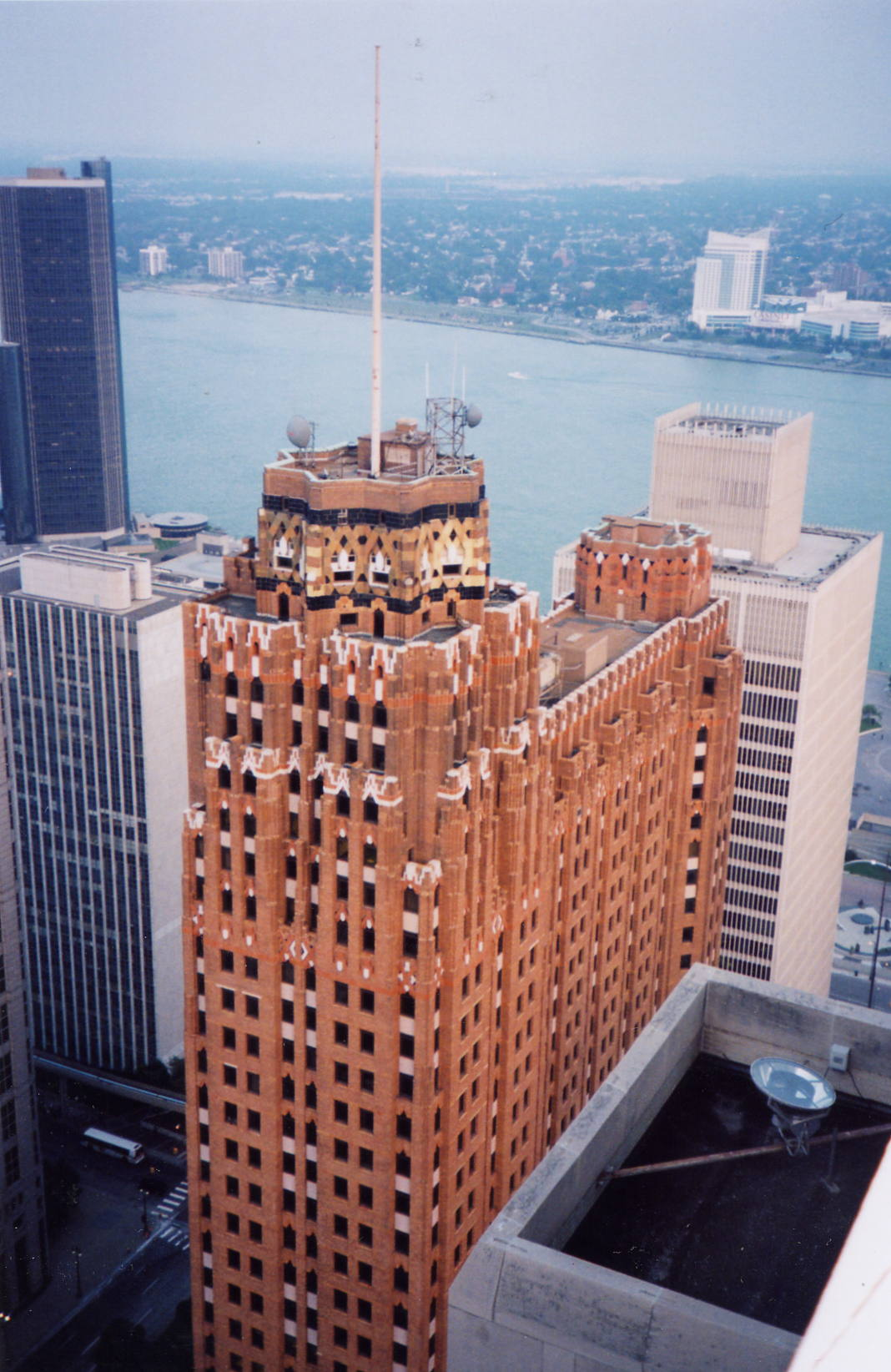
Guardian Building, Detroit, Michigan

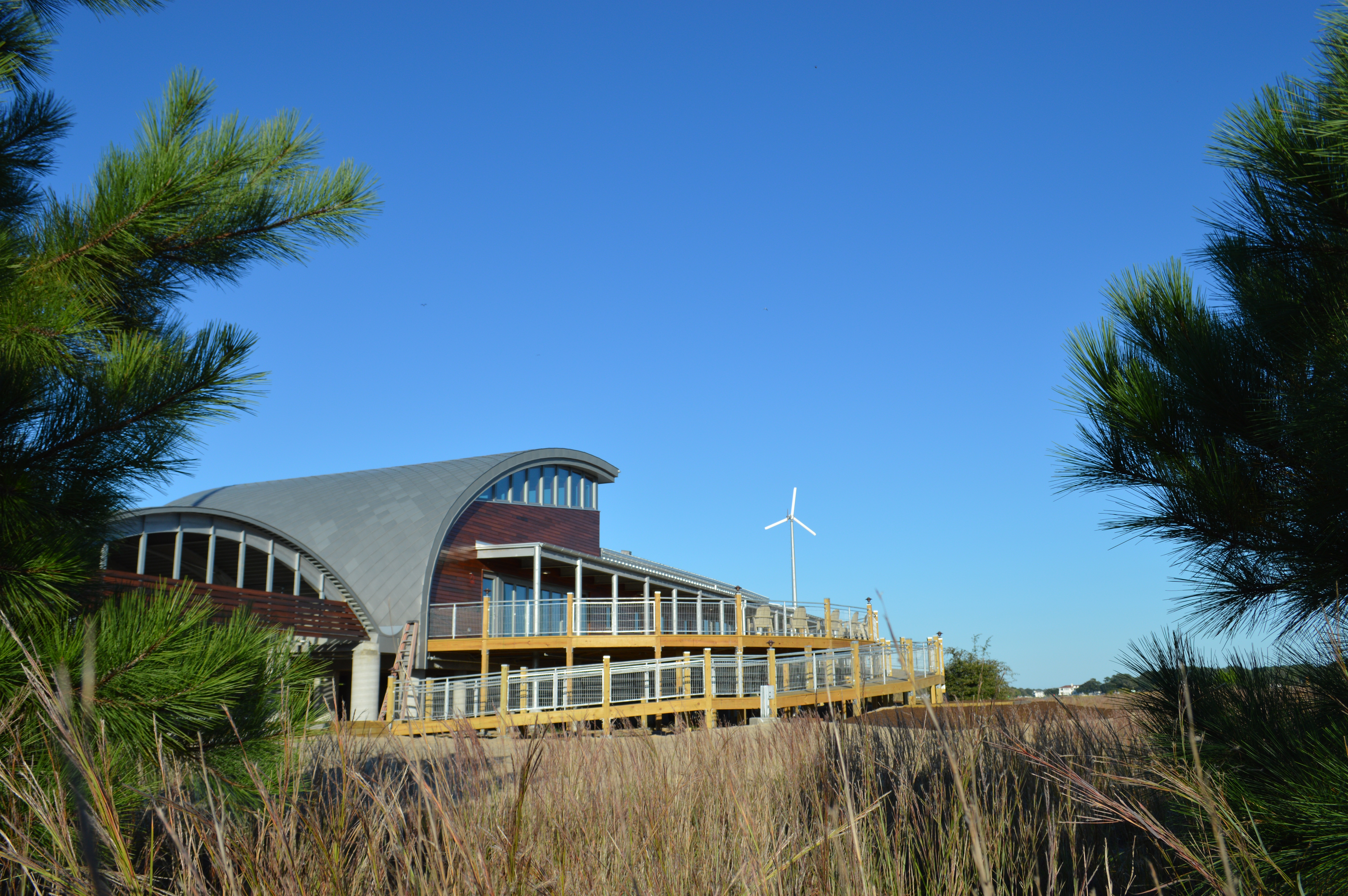
The Brock Environmental Center

== Notable projects ==
Project	Location	Completion Date	Architects	Note
Central United Methodist Church	Detroit, Michigan	1866		
Detroit Opera House	Detroit, Michigan	1868		
Ford Piquette Avenue Plant	Detroit, Michigan	1904		
Dodge Main Factory	Detroit, Michigan	1910		
Central Power Plant, University of Michigan	Ann Arbor, Michigan	1914		
Fyfe Building	Detroit, Michigan	1919	Amedeo Leone	
Hilberry Theatre	Detroit, Michigan	1917	Field, Hinchman and Smith	originally the First Church of Christ Scientist
Yost Ice Arena, University of Michigan	Ann Arbor, Michigan	1923	T. J. Hinchman	formerly, Yost Field House
J. L. Hudson Department Store and Addition	Detroit, Michigan	1946		Demolished in 1998
Bankers Trust Building	Detroit, Michigan	1925	Wirt C. Rowland	
The Players Clubhouse	Detroit, Michigan	1925	William E. Kapp	
Buhl Building	Detroit, Michigan	1925	Wirt C. Rowland	
Mistersky Power Plant	Detroit, Michigan	1925	Amedeo Leone	
Jefferson Avenue Presbyterian Church	Indian Village, Detroit	1926	Wirt C. Rowland	
Meadow Brook Hall	Rochester, Michigan	1926	William E. Kapp	
Parke-Davis Administration Building	Detroit, Michigan	1926	Amedeo Leone	
Michigan Bell (now AT&T) Detroit-Columbia Central Office Building	Detroit, Michigan	1927	Wirt C. Rowland	
Kelvinator Administration Building	Detroit, Michigan	1927	Amedeo Leone	known as Plymouth Road Office Complex (PROC)
League of Catholic Women Building	Detroit, Michigan	1927		
Country Club of Detroit	Grosse Pointe Farms, Michigan		Amedeo Leone	
School and convent buildings, Saint Paul Catholic Church	Grosse Pointe Farms, Michigan			
Music Hall Center for the Performing Arts	Detroit, Michigan	1928	William E. Kapp	
Intramural Sports Building, University of Michigan	Ann Arbor, Michigan	1928	Theodore J. Hinchman	
Penobscot Building	Detroit, Michigan	1928	Wirt C. Rowland	
Guardian Building	Detroit, Michigan	1929	Wirt C. Rowland	Current home of SmithGroup's Detroit office
Denby High School	Detroit, Michigan	1930	Wirt C. Rowland	
Pershing High School	Detroit, Michigan	1930	Wirt C. Rowland	
Detroit Public Library	Detroit, Michigan	1932		
Rackham School of Graduate Studies, University of Michigan	Ann Arbor, Michigan	1938		
Pease Auditorium, Eastern Michigan University	Ypsilanti, Michigan	1941		
GM Tech Center	Warren, Michigan	1955		[Architect of Record]
1001 Woodward	Detroit, Michigan	1965		the former First Federal Building
Whiting Auditorium	Flint, Michigan	1967		
National Institutes of Health Research Laboratories	Bethesda, Maryland	1968		
Kmart Corporation International Headquarters	Troy, Michigan	1969		
Harper Hospital in the Detroit Medical Center	Detroit, Michigan	1970		
Hart Plaza	Detroit, Michigan	1978		including the Dodge Fountain designed by Isamu Noguchi
Joe Louis Arena	Detroit, Michigan	1979		former home of the NHL Detroit Red Wings
IBM Corporation Manufacturing and Engineering Complex	Tucson, Arizona	1979		
Defense Intelligence Agency Headquarters	Washington, DC	1984		
Eli Lilly and Company Biomedical Research Center	Indianapolis, Indiana	1984		
Beckman Institute for Advanced Science and Technology at the University of Illinois at Urbana-Champaign	Urbana, Illinois	1989		
Chrysler World Headquarters	Auburn Hills, Michigan	1996		
Comerica Park	Detroit, Michigan	2000		home of the MLB Detroit Tigers
Phelps Dodge Corporate Headquarters	Phoenix, Arizona	2001		
Chesapeake Bay Foundation Headquarters	Annapolis, Maryland	2001		the first building in the United States to earn a LEED Platinum certification
Edward H. McNamara Terminal Detroit Metropolitan Airport	Romulus, Michigan	2002		
University of California, San Francisco Mission Bay Genentech Hall	San Francisco, California	2002		
Ford Field	Detroit, Michigan	2002		home of the NFL Detroit Lions
Consumers Energy, Corporate Headquarters	Jackson, Michigan	2003		
Discovery Communications World Headquarters	Silver Spring, Maryland	2003		
Federal Reserve Bank of Chicago Detroit Branch	Detroit, Michigan	2004		
Visteon Village, Corporate Headquarters	Detroit, Michigan	2004		
Lawrence Berkeley National Laboratory Molecular Foundry	Berkeley, California	2006		
National Academies Building	Washington, DC			
Chandler City Hall	Chandler, Arizona	2010		
GateWay Community College, Integrated Education Building	Phoenix, Arizona	2012		
Brock Environmental Center	Virginia Beach, Virginia	2014		
University of Illinois, Electrical and Computer Engineering Building	Urbana, Illinois	2014		
University of Pennsylvania, Stephen A. Levin Building	Philadelphia, Pennsylvania	2016		
Museum of the Bible	Washington, DC	2017		
DC Water Headquarters	Washington, DC	2018		the first building in the United States to use a wastewater heat recovery system for heating and cooling
University of Texas at Dallas Engineering Building	Dallas, Texas	2018		
California Pacific Medical Center - Van Ness Campus	San Francisco, California	2019		
University of Michigan Museum of Natural History	Ann Arbor, Michigan	2019		
California Institute of Technology - Chen Neuroscience Research Building	Pasadena, California	2020		
