= Rainy Hamilton Jr. =

African-American architect

Rainy Hamilton Jr. FAIA, NOMA
- Born: September 22, 1956 (age 69); Detroit, Michigan, U.S.
- Education: University of Detroit Mercy
- Occupation: Architect
- Awards: Fellow of the American Institute of Architects, 2013 AIA Detroit Gold Medal 2019 American Institute of Architecture Michigan Firm of the Year Award
- Practice: Architecture
- Buildings: Motown Historical Museum, Detroit Performing Arts High School, Hudson Redevelopment Site, Paradise Valley Cultural & Entertainment District (PVCED),
- Website: www.hamilton-anderson.com

Rainy Hamilton Jr. (born September 22, 1956) is an American architect. He is the president, owner, principal in charge of architecture and co-founder of Hamilton Anderson Associates, a multidisciplinary architectural firm that integrates architecture and site design as the basis of sustainable architecture and planning projects. HAA is one of the largest African-American owned architectural firms in the United States.

A lifelong Detroiter, he was born in Detroit, graduated from Cass Technical High School and The University of Detroit Mercy before beginning his career as an architect. Before starting his own firm in 1992, he worked for Detroit architects Smith, Hinchman & Grylls Associates and Schervish, Vogel, Merz P.C. In 1995 Rainy Hamilton Jr. was recognized as one of Detroit Crain's 40 under 40 leaders.

In 2012, the American Institute of Architects awarded Fellowship to Rainy Hamilton Jr.

In 2013, The Detroit Chapter of the American Institute of Architects awarded the 2013 AIA Detroit Gold Medal to Rainy Hamilton Jr., FAIA, NOMA, principal at Hamilton Anderson Associates and AIA Fellow. He was chosen as the recipient through his "ambitious work in hospitality, government and institutional projects, and dedication to the profession and greater world of design. Hamilton also is committed to the future and prosperity of the City of Detroit, and his leadership in the National Organization of Minority Architects."

Recent projects include the Motown Museum Expansion planned to be completed by 2022. Both Rainy Hamilton JR. and HAA Cofounder Kent Anderson ASLA have been heavily invested in the renewal of Detroit and have been instrumental in the development of the Detroit Futures City plan.
