= Banneker Circle =

Benjamin Banneker Circle
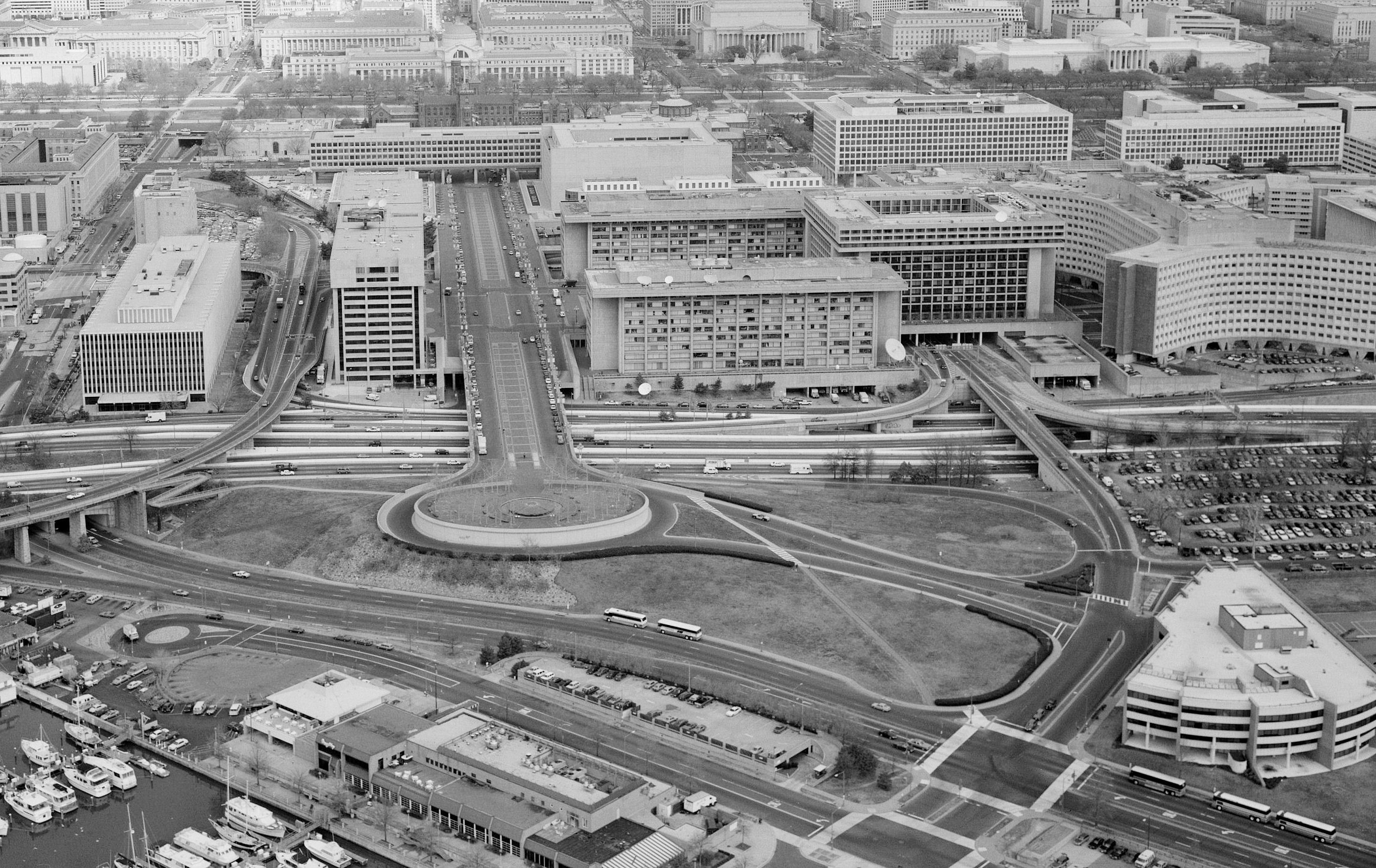
- Looking north at Banneker Park, Circle and Overlook in 1992, with L'Enfant Promenade behind it and the National Mall in the background

Location
- Southwest Waterfront, Washington, D.C.
- Coordinates: 38°52′54″N 77°01′34″W
- Roads at junction: L'Enfant Promenade SW; G Street SW

Construction
- Type: Traffic circle
- Maintained by: DDOT

Banneker Circle is a partial traffic circle in Southwest Washington, D.C. The name of the circle commemorates Benjamin Banneker, an African American astronomer and almanac author. In 1791, Banneker assisted in the initial survey of the boundaries of the District of Columbia. The circle is near the south end of L'Enfant Promenade and the intersection of Interstate 395 and Maine Avenue. Benjamin Banneker Park is located in the center of the circle.

== See also ==
- List of circles in Washington, D.C.
