= Commemorations of Benjamin Banneker =

Commemorations of American scientist, surveyor and farmer

A United States postage stamp and the names of a number of recreational and cultural facilities, schools, streets and other facilities and institutions throughout the United States have commemorated Benjamin Banneker's documented and mythical accomplishments throughout the years since he lived (1731–1806) (see Mythology of Benjamin Banneker). Among such memorializations of this free African American almanac author, surveyor, landowner and farmer who had knowledge of mathematics, astronomy and natural history was a biographical verse that Rita Dove, a future Poet Laureate of the United States, wrote in 1983 while on the faculty of Arizona State University.

== Benjamin Banneker postage stamp ==
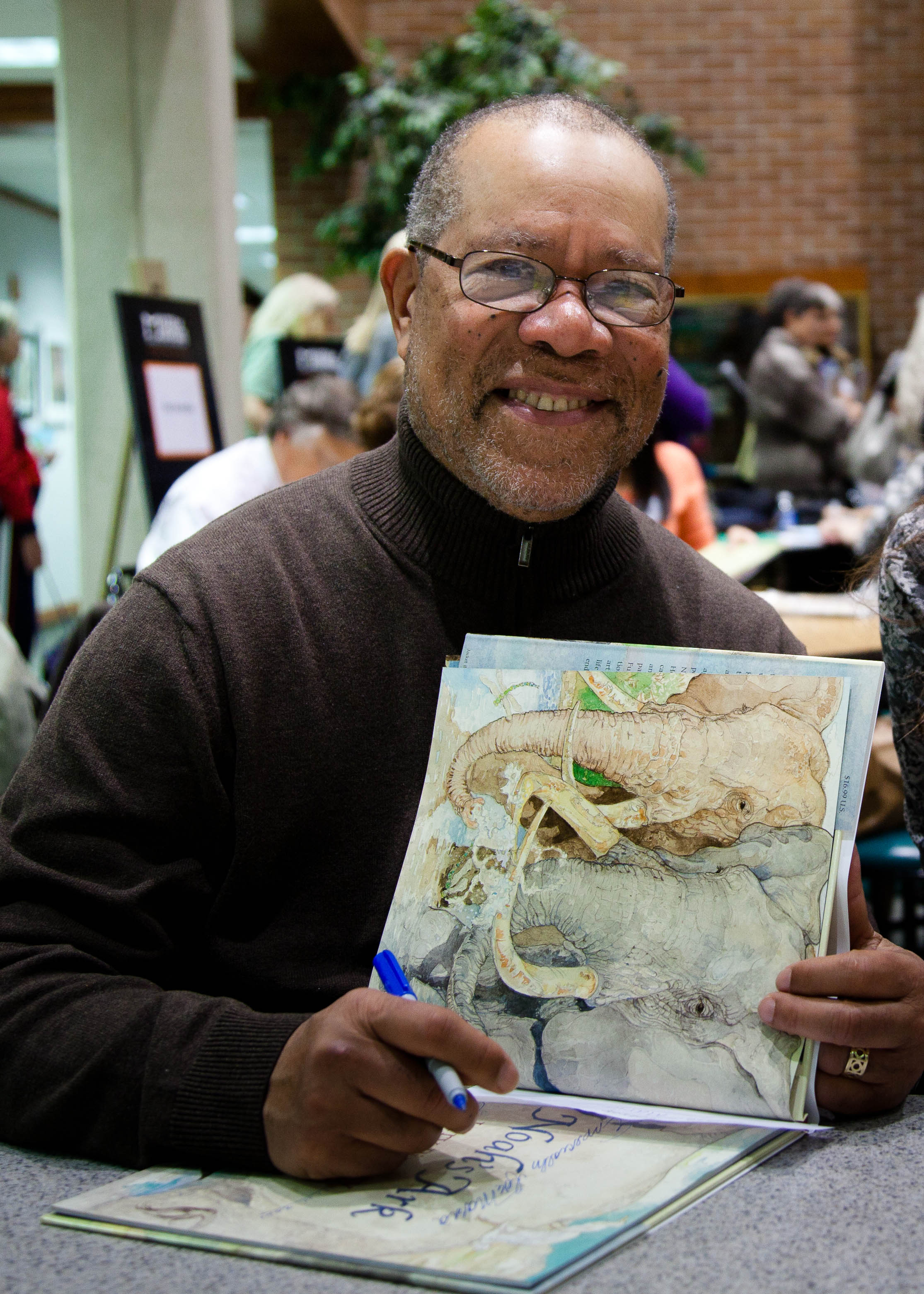
Jerry Pinckney (2011)

On February 15, 1980, during Black History Month, the United States Postal Service issued in Annapolis, Maryland, a 15 cent commemorative postage stamp that featured a portrait of Banneker. An image of Banneker standing behind a short telescope mounted on a tripod was superimposed upon the portrait. The device shown in the stamp resembles Andrew Ellicott's transit and equal altitude instrument (see Theodolite), which is now in the collection of the Smithsonian Institution's National Museum of American History in Washington, D.C.

The stamp was the third in the Postal Service's Black Heritage stamp series. The featured portrait was one that Jerry Pinkney of Croton-on-Hudson, New York, who designed the first nine stamps in the series, had earlier placed on another approved version of the stamp. Historian Silvio Bedini subsequently noted that, because no known portrait of Banneker exists, the stamp artist had based the portrait on "imagined features".

== Recreational and cultural facilities ==
The names of a number of recreational and cultural facilities commemorate Banneker. These facilities include parks, playgrounds, community centers, museums and a planetarium.

=== Parks ===
==== Benjamin Banneker Historical Park and Museum, Baltimore County, Maryland ====
A park commemorating Benjamin Banneker is located in a stream valley woodland at the former site of Banneker's farm and residence in Oella, Maryland, between Ellicott City and the City of Baltimore. (Note: Coordinates of Benjamin Banneker Historical Park, Baltimore County, Maryland: 39°16′07″N 76°46′36″W) The Baltimore County Department of Recreation and Parks manages the $2.5 million facility, which was dedicated on June 9, 1998.

The park, which encompasses 138 acres (56 ha) and contains archaeological sites and extensive nature trails, is the largest original African American historical site in the United States. The primary focus of the park is a museum highlighting Banneker's contributions. (Note: Coordinates of Benjamin Banneker Museum, Baltimore County, Maryland: 39°16′08″N 76°46′30″W) The museum contains a visitors center that features a collection of Banneker's works and artifacts, a community gallery, a gift shop and a patio garden.

The park contains an 1850s stone farmhouse, now named the "Molly Banneky House". The three-story house was restored as an office complex in 2004. (Note: Coordinates of Molly Banneky House: 39°16′13″N 76°46′36″W)

On November 12, 2009, officials opened a 224 square feet (20.8 m^{2}) replica of Banneker's log cabin on the park grounds, reportedly two days before the 278th anniversary of Banneker's birth. (Note: Coordinates of replica of Benjamin Banneker's log cabin: 39°16′07″N 76°46′32″W) Baltimore County's delegation to the Maryland General Assembly secured a $400,000 state bond for the design and construction of the cabin. The original estimated cost to construct the cabin in accordance with its drawings and specifications was $240,700.

A historical marker that the Maryland Historical Society erected to commemorate Banneker stands on the grounds of the park. The marker replaced the last of three earlier markers that vandals had previously destroyed, the first of which the Maryland State Roads Commission had installed nearby in 1954 on the grounds of the Westchester Grade School (now the Westchester Community Center). (Note: Coordinates of Westchester Community Center, Baltimore County, Maryland: 39°16′25″N 76°46′50″W)

===== Gallery of Benjamin Banneker Historical Park and Museum =====
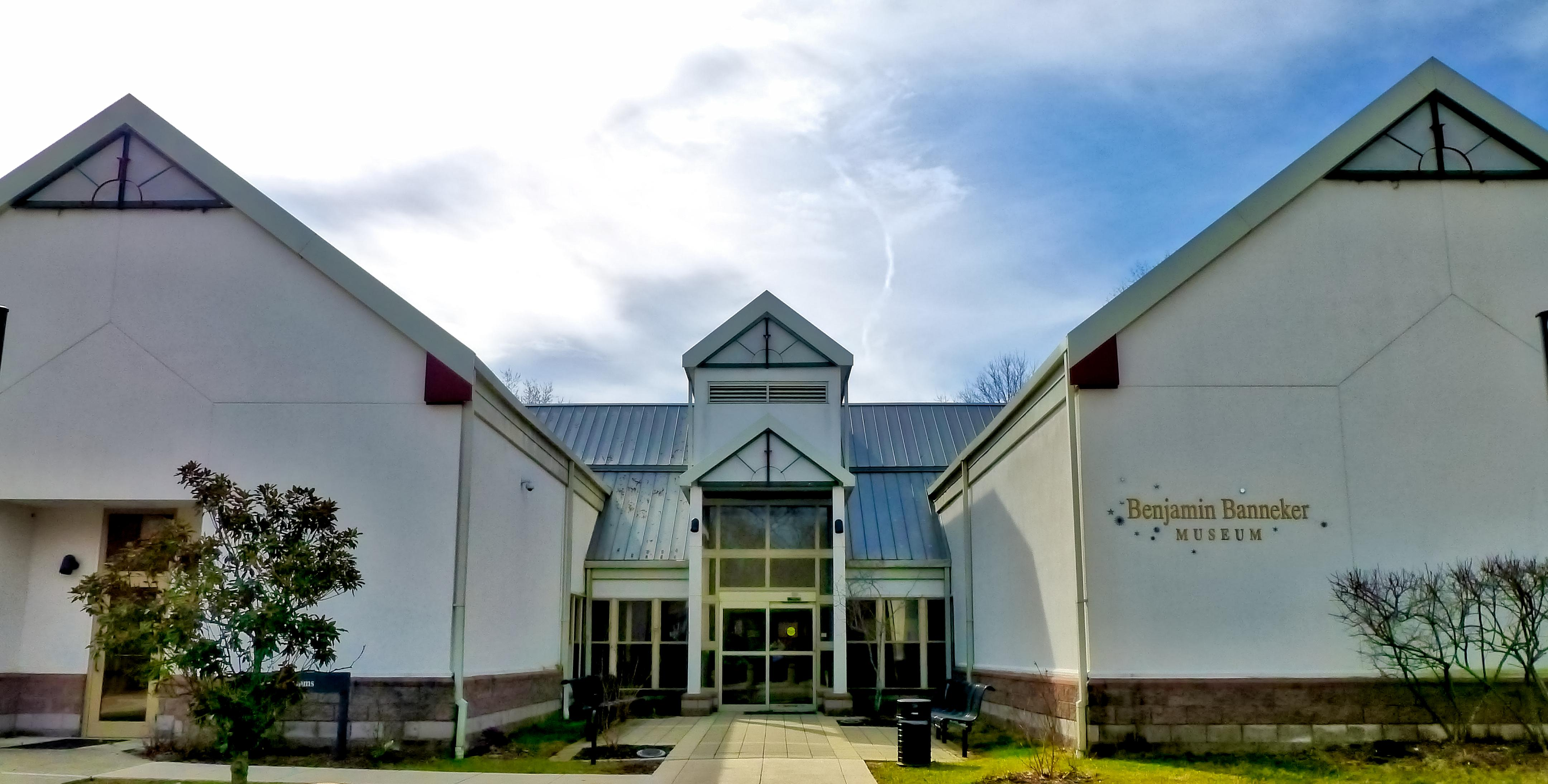
Benjamin Banneker Museum (2017)

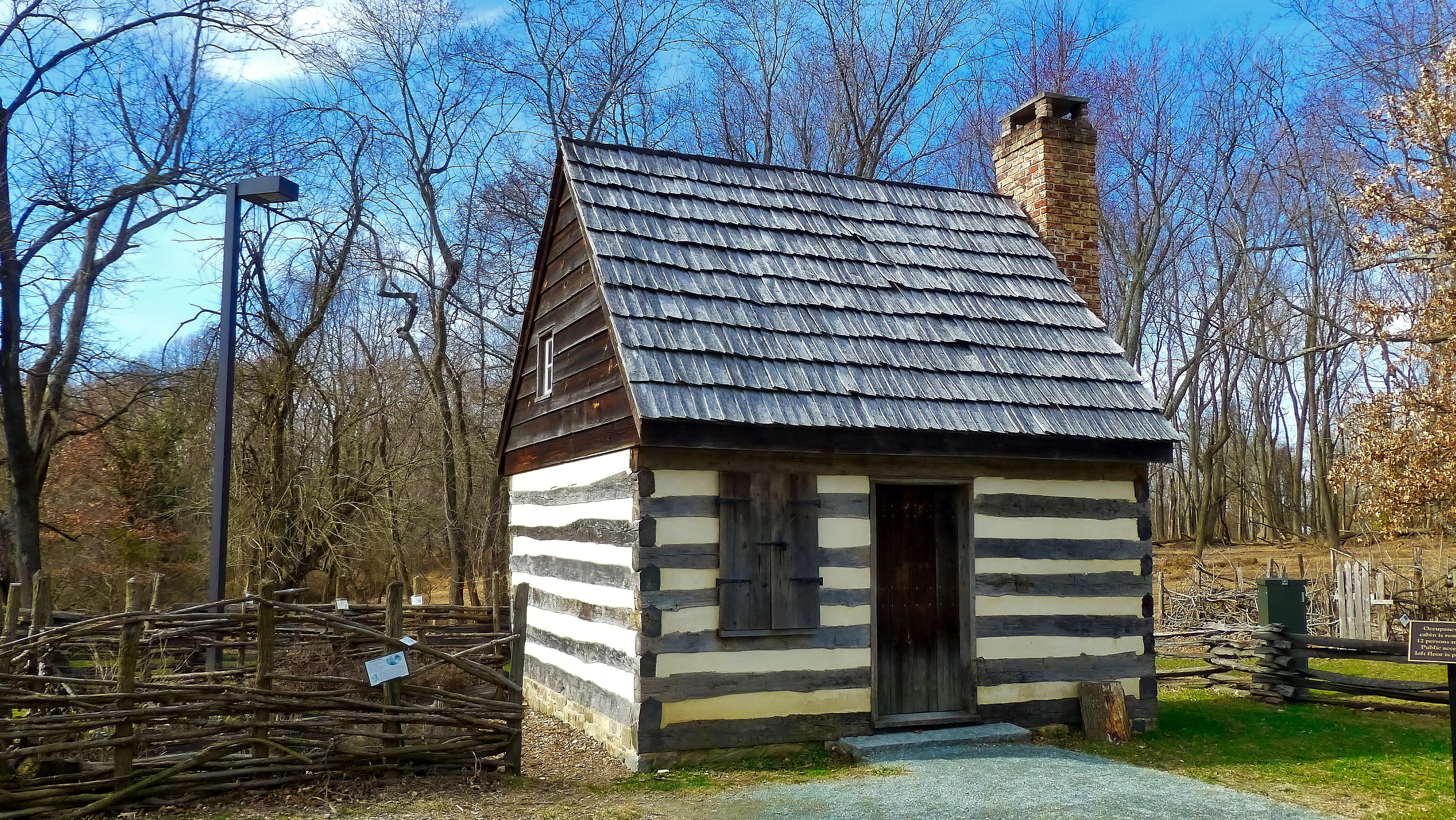
Replica of Banneker's log cabin (2017)

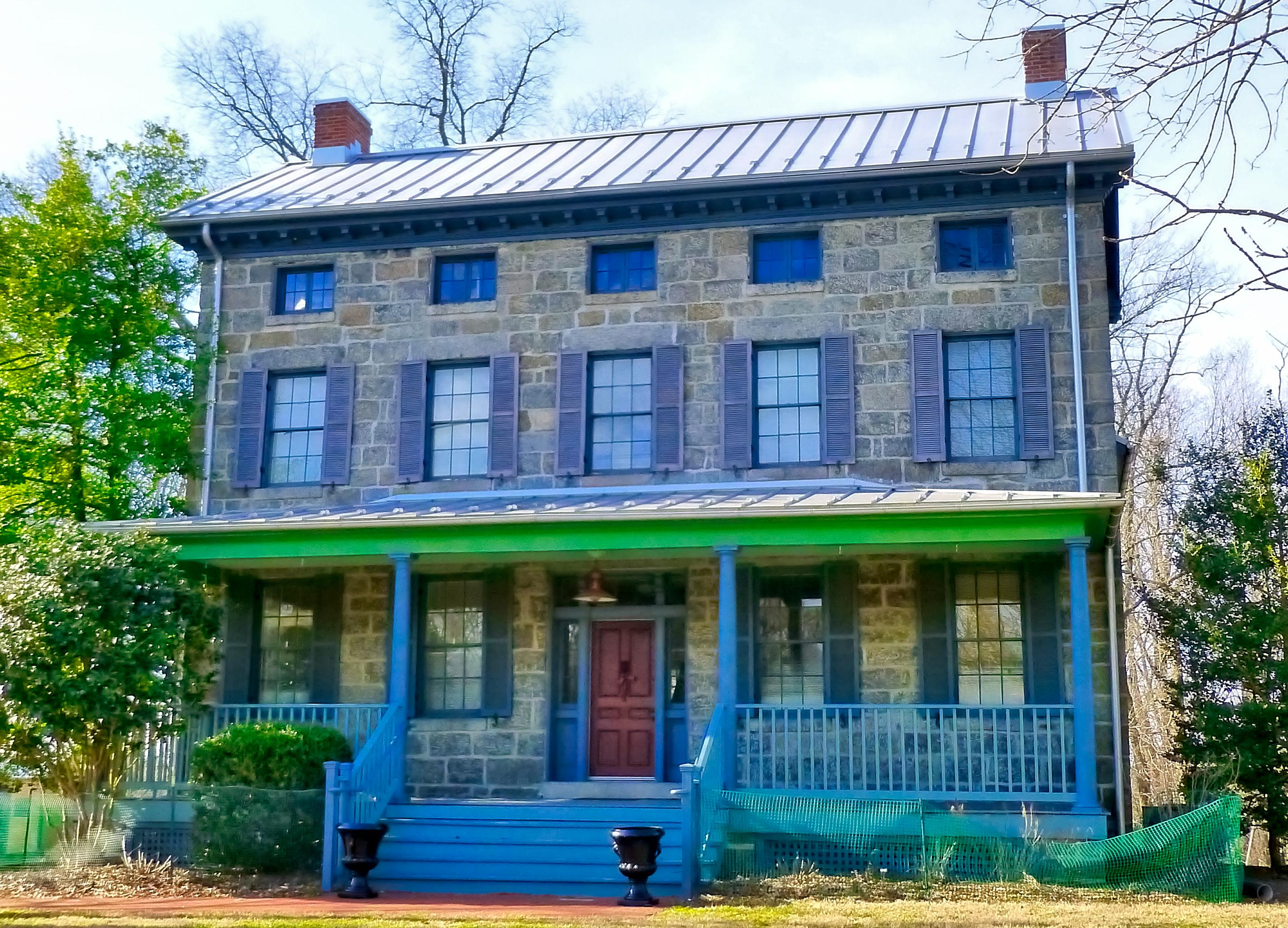
Molly Banneky House (2017)

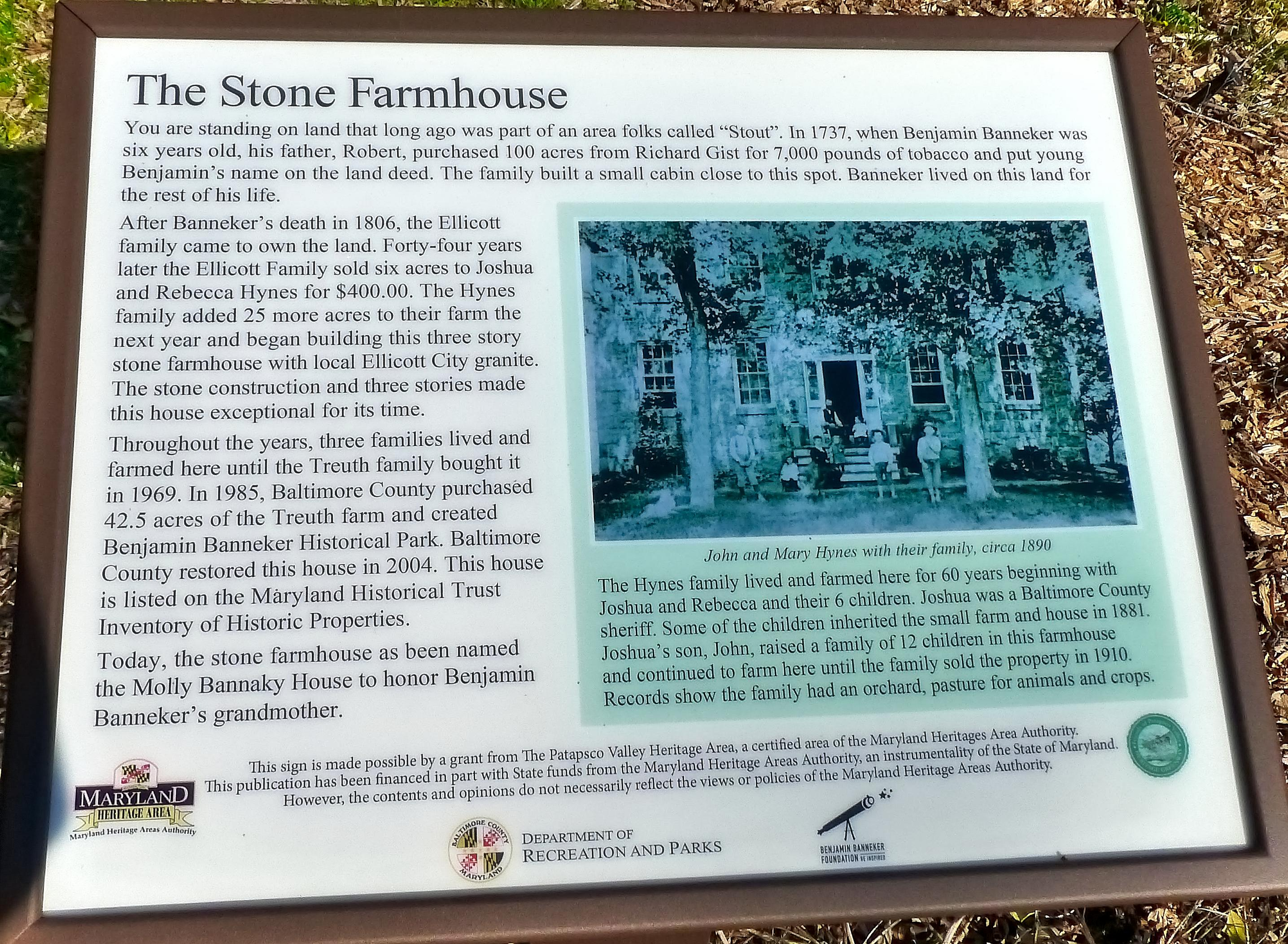
Stone Farmhouse historical marker (2017)

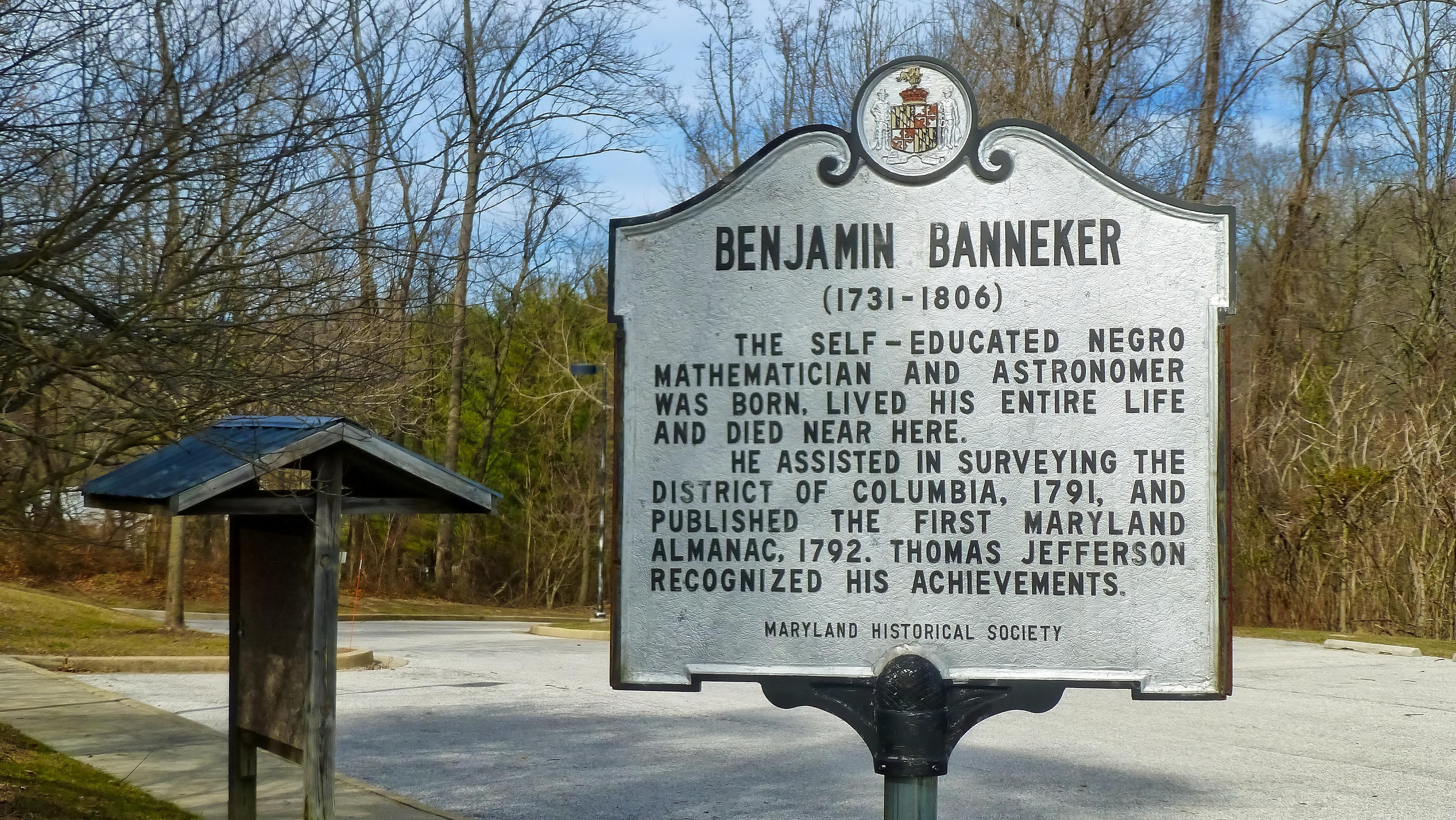
Benjamin Banneker historical marker (2017)

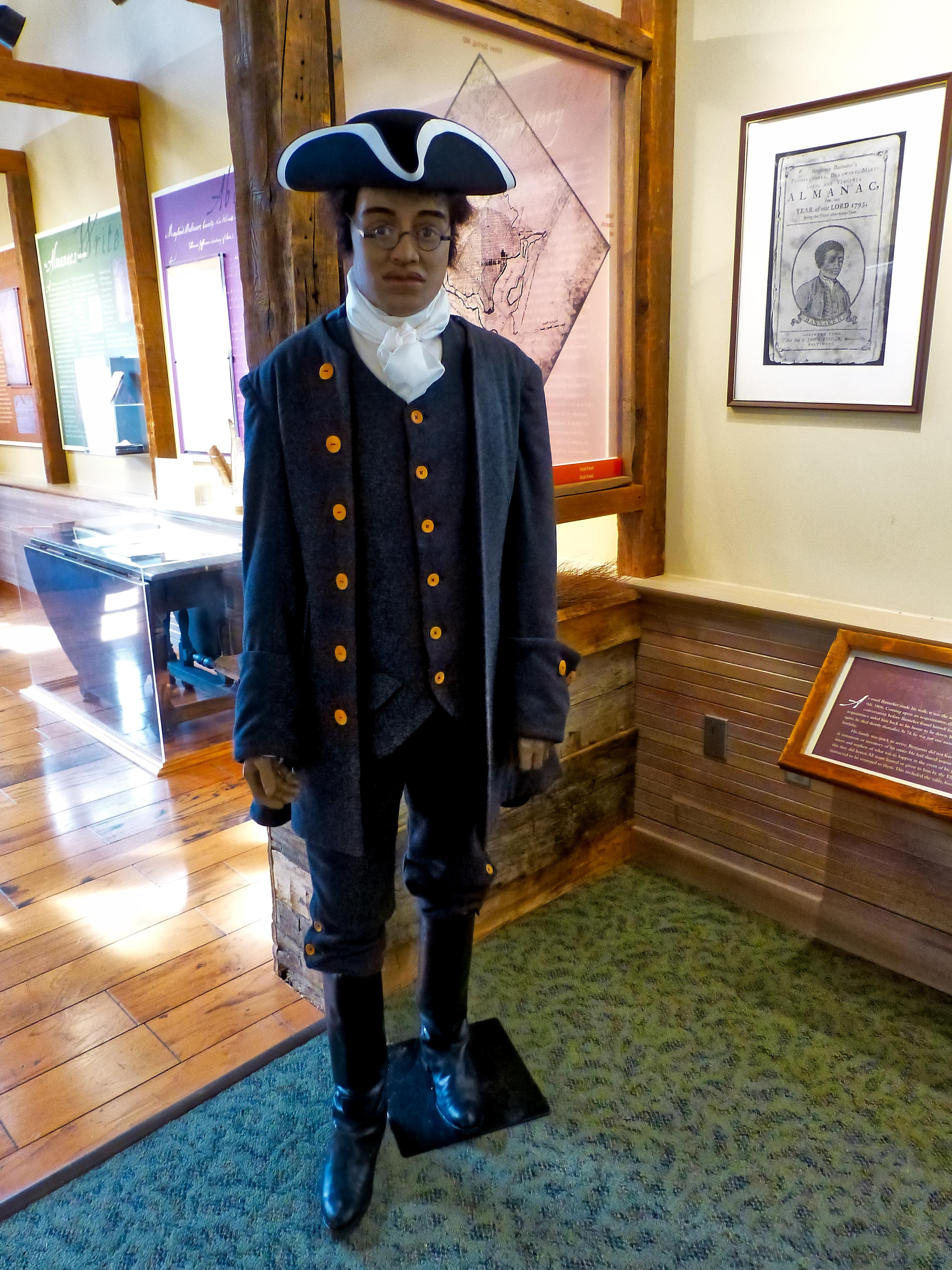
Museum interior (2017)

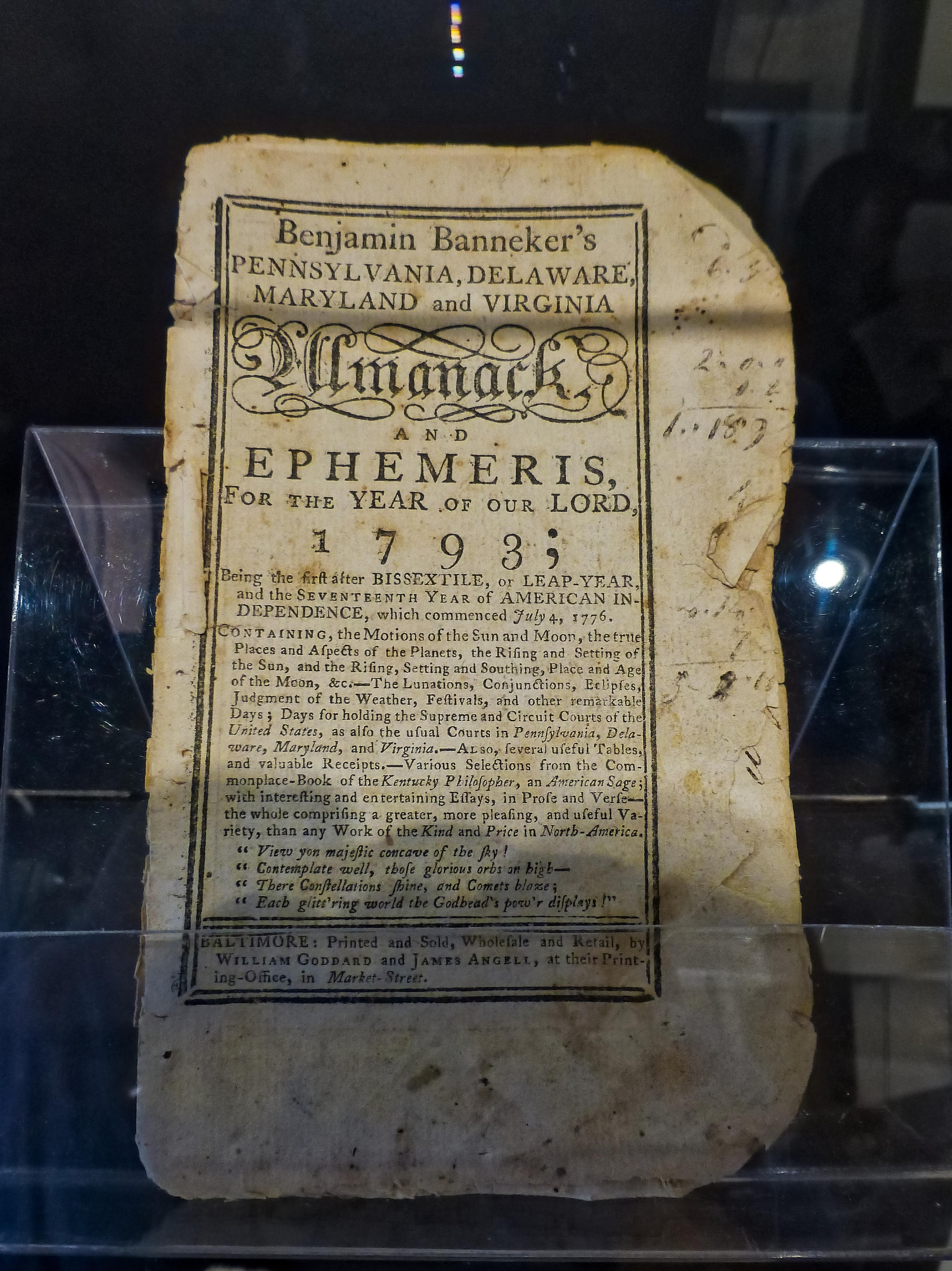
Title page of a Baltimore edition of Banneker's 1793 almanac (2017)

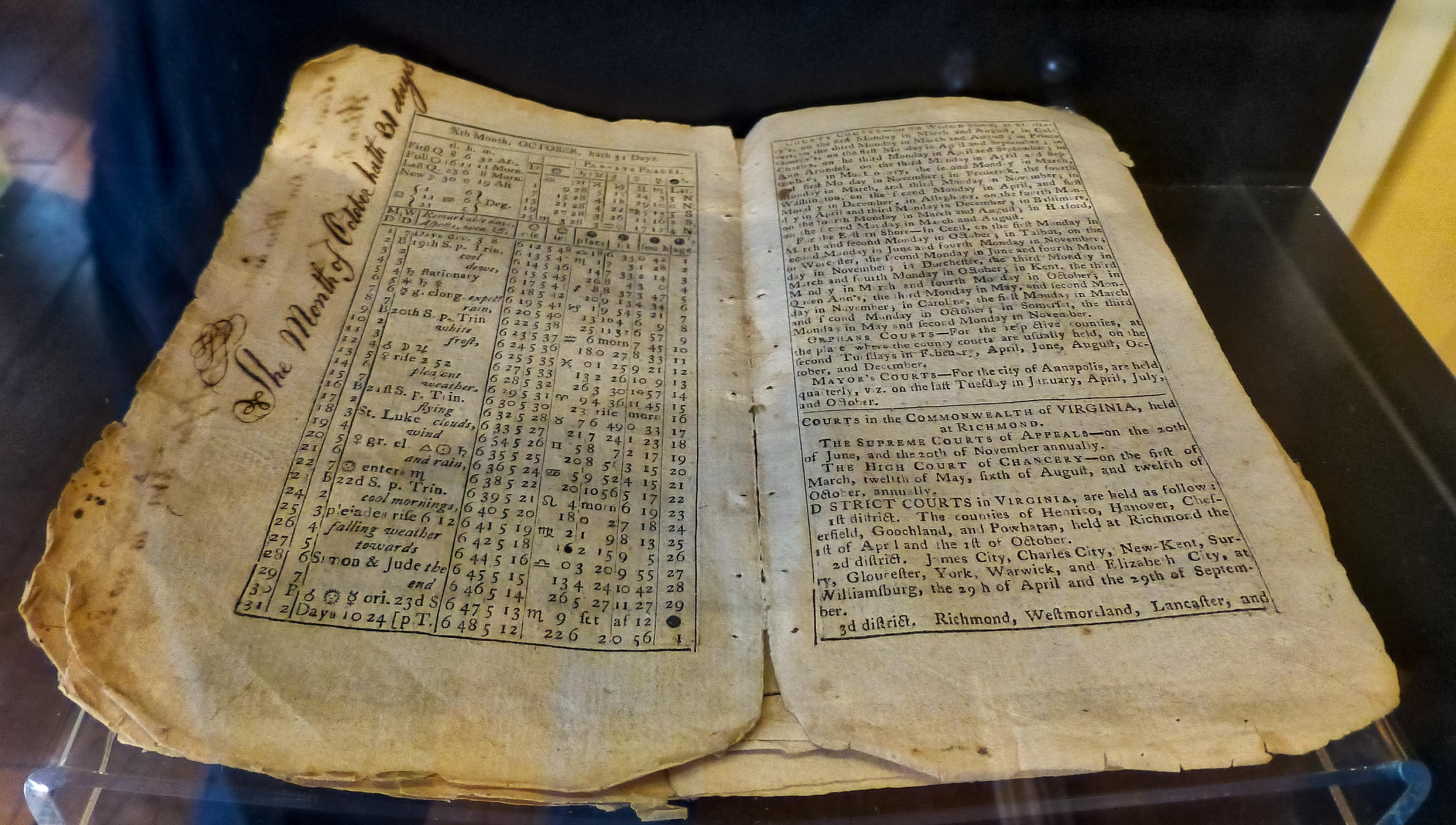
Pages from Banneker's almanac (2017)

==== Benjamin Banneker Park and Memorial, Washington, D.C. ====
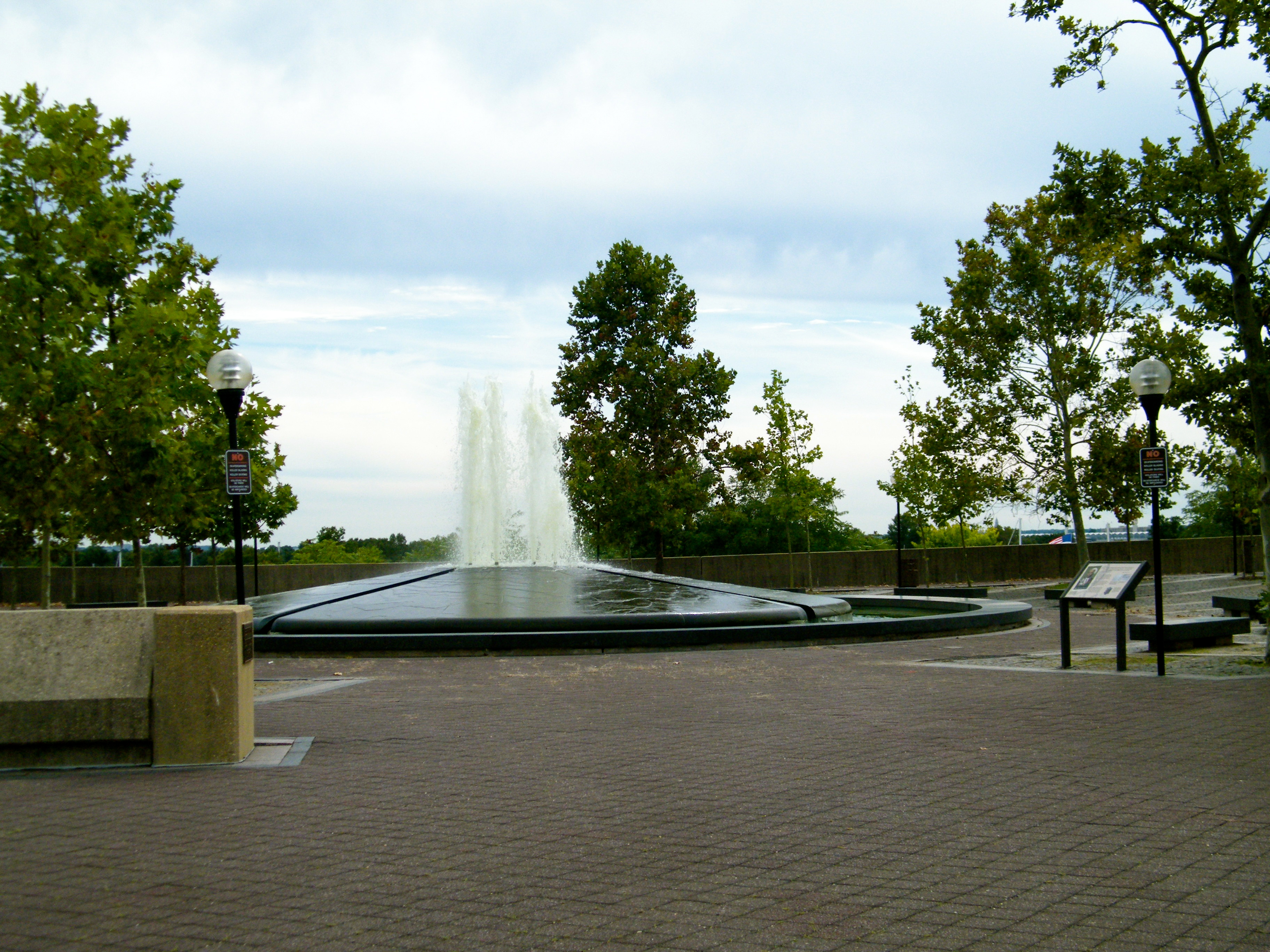
The plaza and fountain in Benjamin Banneker Park in Washington, D.C. in 2011

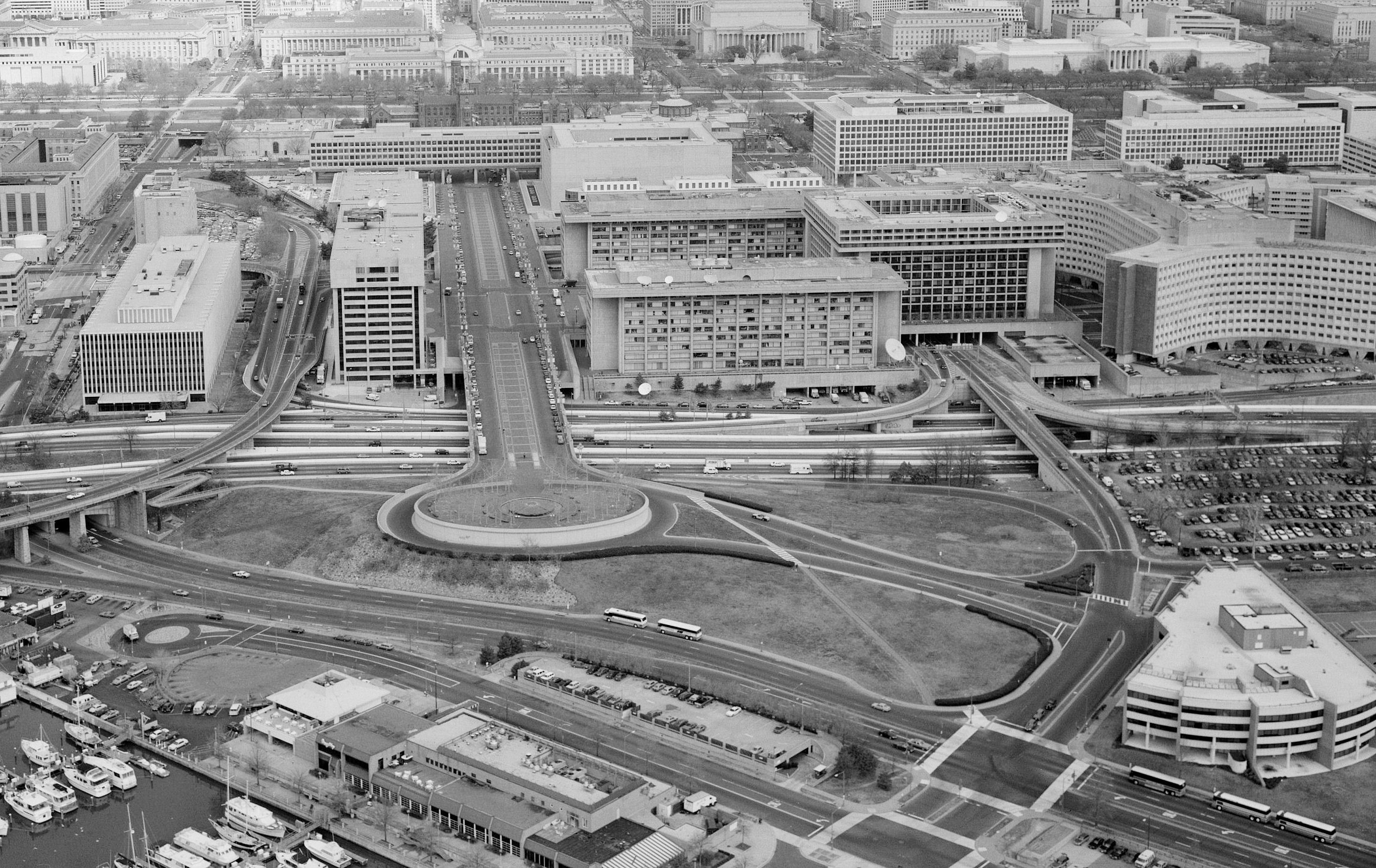
The Library of Congress looking north at Benjamin Banneker Park and Overlook with L'Enfant Plaza and the James V. Forrestal Building, the Smithsonian Institution Building and the National Mall in the background in 1990

A 4.7 acres (1.9 ha) urban park memorializing Benjamin Banneker is located in southwest Washington, D.C., one half mile (800 m) south of the Smithsonian Institution's "Castle" on the National Mall. The park features a prominent overlook at the south end of L'Enfant Promenade and Tenth Street SW. (Note: Coordinates of Benjamin Banneker Park, Washington, D.C.: 38°52′54″N 77°01′34″W)

A traffic circle, named Banneker Circle SW, surrounds the overlook. A grassy slope descends steeply from the traffic circle to the Southwest Freeway (Interstate 395), Ninth Street SW and Maine Avenue SW.

The National Park Service (NPS) operates the park as part of its National Mall and Memorial Parks administrative unit. The NPS erected a historical marker near the park's entrance in 1997. The park is now at stop number 8 on Washington's Southwest Heritage Trail.

In 1967, landscape architect Daniel Urban Kiley completed the design of the "Tenth Street Overlook". After the District of Columbia Redevelopment Land Agency completed construction of the Overlook in 1969, the Agency transferred the Overlook to the NPS in 1970.

The elliptical 200 feet (61 m) wide overlook provides elevated views of the nearby Southwest Waterfront, Washington Channel, East Potomac Park, Potomac River and more distant areas. The centerpiece of the overlook's modernist plaza is a large conical fountain that projects water more than 30 feet in the air and catches it in a circular basin made from honed green granite.

The rings of the fountain and basin in the center of the site are reiterated in the benches, double rows of London plane trees, and low concrete walls that establish the plaza's edge. The ground plane is paved with granite squares, a continuation of L'Enfant Promenade's materials. The ground plane is concave, and with the trees and fountain helps define the spatial volume of the plaza.

In 1970, the District of Columbia City Council passed a resolution that petitioned the NPS to rename the Overlook as Banneker Park, arguing that the council had already renamed the adjacent highway circle as Banneker Circle, S.W. The NPS thereupon hosted a dedication ceremony in 1971 that renamed the Overlook as "Benjamin Banneker Park".

Following completion of a restoration project, the park was ceremoniously rededicated in 1997 to again commemorate Banneker; the area has no specific connection to Banneker himself.

In 1998, the 105th United States Congress enacted legislation that authorized the Washington Interdependence Council of the District of Columbia to establish at the council's expense a memorial on federal land in the District that would commemorate Banneker's accomplishments. The Council plans to erect this memorial in or near the park. In 2006, the Council held a charrette to select the artist that would design the memorial.

Construction of the memorial was expected to begin after the United States Commission of Fine Arts and the National Capital Planning Commission (NCPC) approved the memorial's design and location in accordance with the legislation that authorized the establishment of the memorial and with the United States Code (40 U.S.C. § 8905). However, the proposed memorial had by 1999 become a $17 million project that would contain a visitors' center near the "Castle" at the north end of the Promenade, a clock atop a tall pedestal at the midpoint of the Promenade, a statue of Banneker in the park's circle at the south end of the Promenade and a skyway over Interstate 395 that would connect the park to the waterfront. After considering the proposal, the National Capital Memorial Commission rejected the placement of the statue in the park and decided to consult with the District of Columbia government about placing a Banneker memorial at the midpoint of the Promenade.

The legislative authority relative to locating the Memorial on federal land lapsed in 2005. This did not preclude the location of the memorial on lands such as the road right-of-way in the Promenade that are under the jurisdiction of the District of Columbia's government.

During the 2000s, various organizations proposed to develop at the site of Benjamin Banneker Park a number of large facilities including a baseball stadium (later constructed elsewhere in D.C. as Nationals Park), the National Museum of African American History and Culture, a National Children's Museum and a National Museum of the American Latino. In 2004, the D.C. Preservation League listed the Park as one of the most endangered places in the District because of such proposals to redevelop the park's area. The League stated that the park, "Designed by renowned landscape architect Daniel Urban Kiley ... is culturally significant as the first public space in Washington named for an African American and is usually included in Black History tours".

In 2006, the District government and the Federal Highway Administration issued an environmental assessment for "improvements" to the promenade and park that described a number of projects that could redevelop the area containing the park. In 2011, a proposal surfaced that would erect a structure housing a "National Museum of the American People" at or near the site of the park.

In 2012, the United States Army Corps of Engineers determined that Benjamin Banneker Park was not eligible for inclusion in the National Register of Historic Places. However, the District of Columbia State Historic Preservation Office (DC SHPO) did not concur with this determination.

The DC SHPO stated that additional research and coordination with the NPS would be needed before it could make a final determination of eligibility. In 2014, the DC SHPO concurred with the superintendent of the National Mall and Memorial Parks that the park was eligible for inclusion in the National Register as an integral component of the 10th Street Promenade/Banneker Overlook composition, but not as an independent entity.

In January 2013, the National Capital Planning Commission (NCPC) accepted "The SW Ecodistrict Plan" (see: Southwest Ecodistrict). The Plan recommended the redesign of Benjamin Banneker Park and adjacent areas to accommodate one or more new memorials, museums and/or landscaping.

in 2013, the NPS issued a "Cultural Landscapes Inventory" report for the park. The report described the features, significance and history of the park and its surrounding area, as well the planning processes that had influenced the park's construction and development.

In September 2014, the NCPC accepted an addendum to the SW Ecodistrict Plan. The addendum stated: "A modern, terraced landscape at Banneker Park is envisioned to enhance the park and to provide a gateway to the National Mall."

In April 2017, the NCPC approved plans for a staircase and ramp that would connect the park with Washington's Southwest Waterfront and that would add lighting and trees to the area. The NCPC and the NPS intended the project to be an interim improvement that could be in place for ten years while the area awaits redevelopment. Construction began on the project in September 2017 and was completed during the spring of 2018.

==== Benjamin Banneker Park, Arlington County, Virginia ====
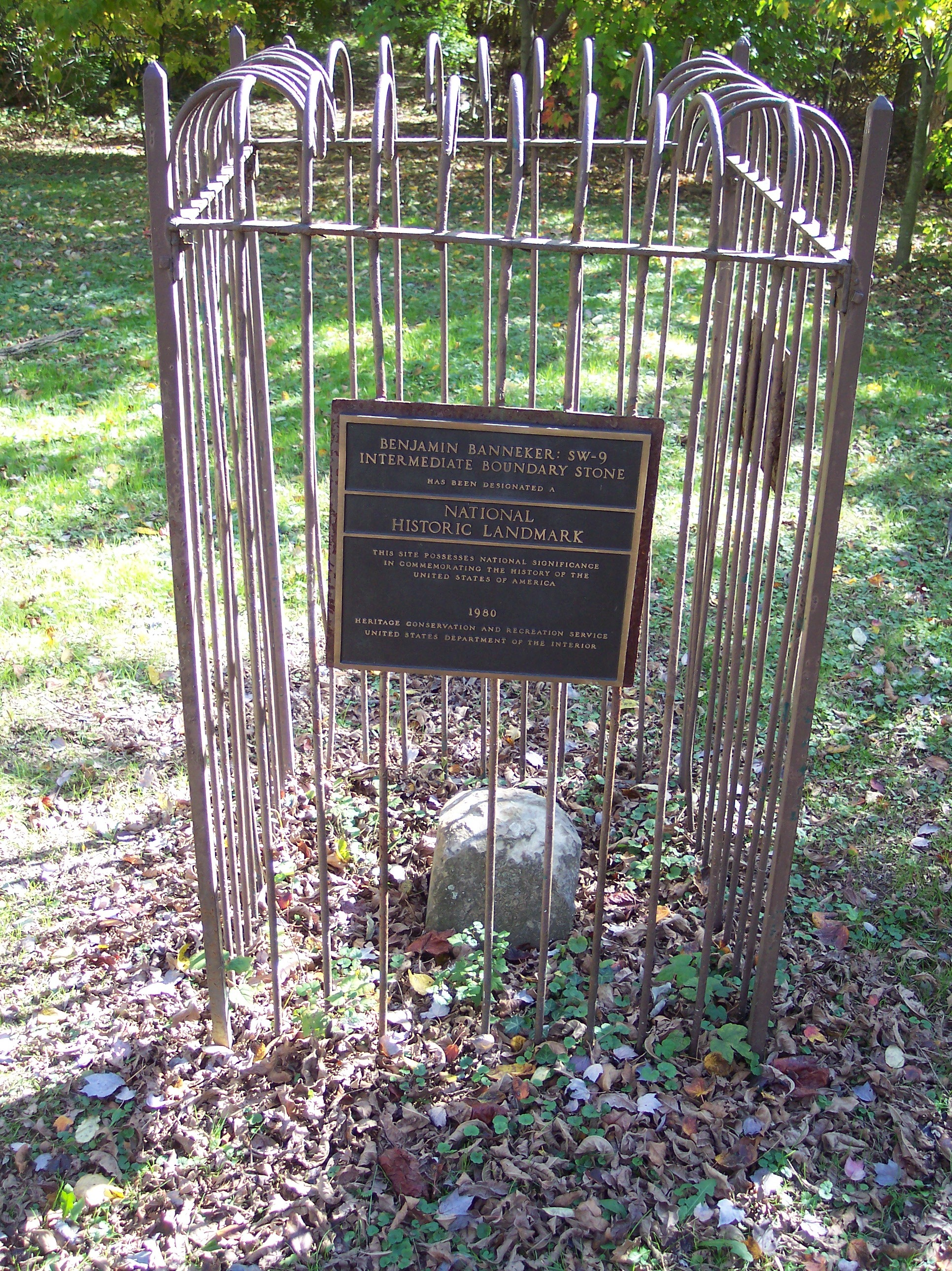
Benjamin Banneker: SW-9 Intermediate Boundary Stone of the District of Columbia (2012)

An 11 acres (4.5 ha) park in Arlington County, Virginia, memorializes Banneker and the survey of the boundaries of the District of Columbia, in which he participated. The park features access to paved trails, picnic tables with charcoal grills, a playground, a playing field, a stream and a dog park. The Benjamin Banneker: SW-9 Intermediate Boundary Stone, one of the forty boundary markers of the original District of Columbia, is within the park.

=== Playground ===
==== Banneker Playground, Brooklyn, New York ====
The Banneker Playground in Brooklyn, New York, was originally built by the federal Works Progress Administration in 1937. In 1985, the New York City parks department renamed the 1.67 acres (0.68 ha) playground to commemorate Benjamin Banneker. The playground contains handball and basketball courts, trees and a sculpture of a sitting camel. The Benjamin Banneker Elementary School (P.S. 256), built in 1956, is near the playground.

=== Community Centers ===
==== Banneker Community Center, Catonsville, Maryland ====
The Banneker Community Center (Banneker Recreation Center) in Catonsville, Maryland, is located near the intersection of the Baltimore National Pike (U.S. Route 40) and the Baltimore Beltway (Interstate 695), about 2 miles (3 km) northeast of the former site of Banneker's home and farm. A unit of the Baltimore County Department of Recreation and Parks, the facility contains ballfields, multipurpose courts and a playground. (Note: Coordinates of Benjamin Banneker Community Center, Catonsville, Maryland: 39°16′50″N 76°44′25″W)

===== Banneker Community Center, Washington, D.C. =====
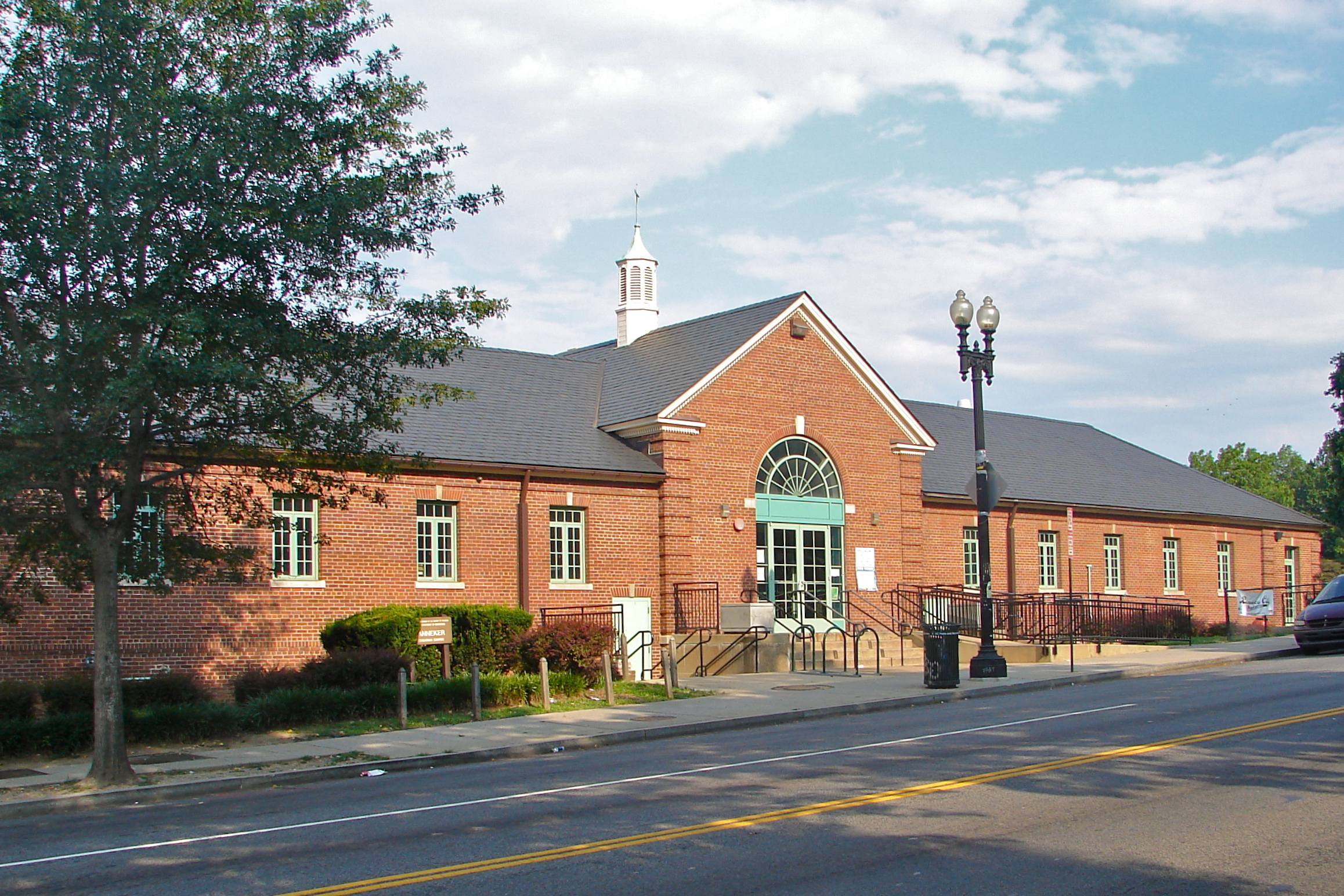
Banneker Community Center, Washington, D.C. (2011)

The Banneker Community Center in northwest Washington, D.C. is located near Howard University in the city's Columbia Heights neighborhood. The center, which is a unit of the District of Columbia Department of Parks and Recreation, contains playing fields, basketball and tennis courts, a swimming pool (Banneker pool), a computer lab and other indoor and outdoor facilities. Constructed in 1934 and named for Benjamin Banneker, the center's building (formerly named the Banneker Recreation Center) was listed on the National Register of Historic Places in 1986 because of its role as a focal point in the development of the black community in Washington, D.C.

===== Benjamin Banneker Community Center, Bloomington, Indiana =====
The Benjamin Banneker Community Center in Bloomington, Indiana, contains a gymnasium, restrooms, a kitchen, a library and a family resource center. Benjamin Banneker School was a segregated school for Bloomington's African American residents from 1915 to 1951. When the school desegregated, its name was changed to Fairview Annex. In 1955, the school's building became the Westside Community Center. In 1994, the Bloomington City Council changed the community center's name to commemorate the building's history as a segregated school and to re-commemorate Benjamin Banneker. The City of Bloomington's Parks and Recreation Department operates the center.

=== Museums ===
==== Banneker-Douglass Museum, Annapolis, Maryland ====
The Banneker-Douglass Museum in Annapolis, Maryland, memorializes Benjamin Banneker and Frederick Douglass. The museum, which was dedicated on February 24, 1984, is the State of Maryland's official museum of African American heritage. It is housed within and adjacent to the former Mount Moriah African Methodist Episcopal Church, which the National Park Service placed on the National Register of Historic Places in 1973.

==== Smithsonian National Museum of African American History and Culture, Washington, D.C. ====
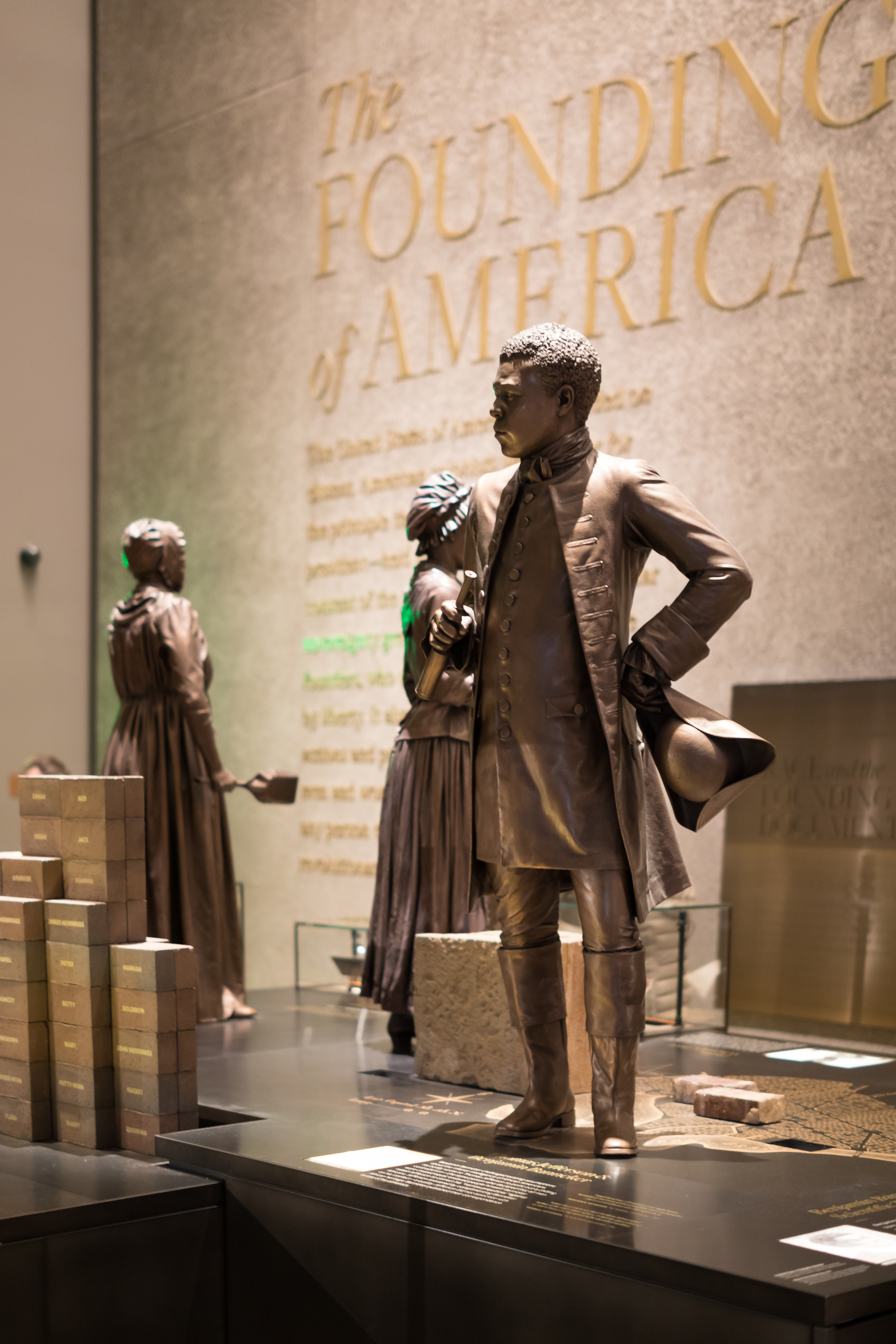
Statue of Benjamin Banneker in the Smithsonian National Museum of African American History and Culture, Washington, D.C. (2020)

The Smithsonian Institution's National Museum of African American History and Culture, which opened in Washington, D.C., during 2016, displays a statue of Benjamin Banneker within an exhibit entitled "The Founding of America".

=== Planetarium ===
==== Banneker Planetarium, Catonsville, Maryland ====
The Banneker Planetarium in Catonsville, Maryland, is located about 2 miles (3 km) southeast of the former site of Benjamin Banneker's home and farm. The planetarium is a component of the Community College of Baltimore County's Catonsville Campus. Operated by the college's School of Mathematics and Science, the planetarium offers shows and programs to the public. (Note: Coordinates of Community College of Baltimore County, Catonsville, Maryland: 39°15′12″N 76°44′08″W)

== Educational institutions ==
The names of a number of university buildings, high schools, middle schools, elementary schools, professorships and scholarships throughout the United States have commemorated Benjamin Banneker. These include:

=== University buildings, rooms, programs and memorials ===
- Banneker Hall, Morgan State University, Baltimore, Maryland
- Benjamin Banneker Hall, Bowie State University, Bowie, Maryland (building destroyed)
- Benjamin Banneker Hall, Tuskegee University, Tuskegee, Alabama
- Benjamin Banneker Hall, University of Maryland Eastern Shore, Princess Anne, Maryland,
- Benjamin Banneker Honors College, Prairie View A&M University, Prairie View, Texas
- Benjamin Banneker Memorial Sundial, Howard University, Washington, D.C.
- Benjamin Banneker Room, Adele H. Stamp Student Union, University of Maryland, College Park, Maryland
- Benjamin Banneker Science Hall, Central State University, Wilberforce, Ohio
- Benjamin Banneker Technology Complex, Florida Agricultural and Mechanical University, Tallahassee, Florida

=== High schools and high school rooms ===
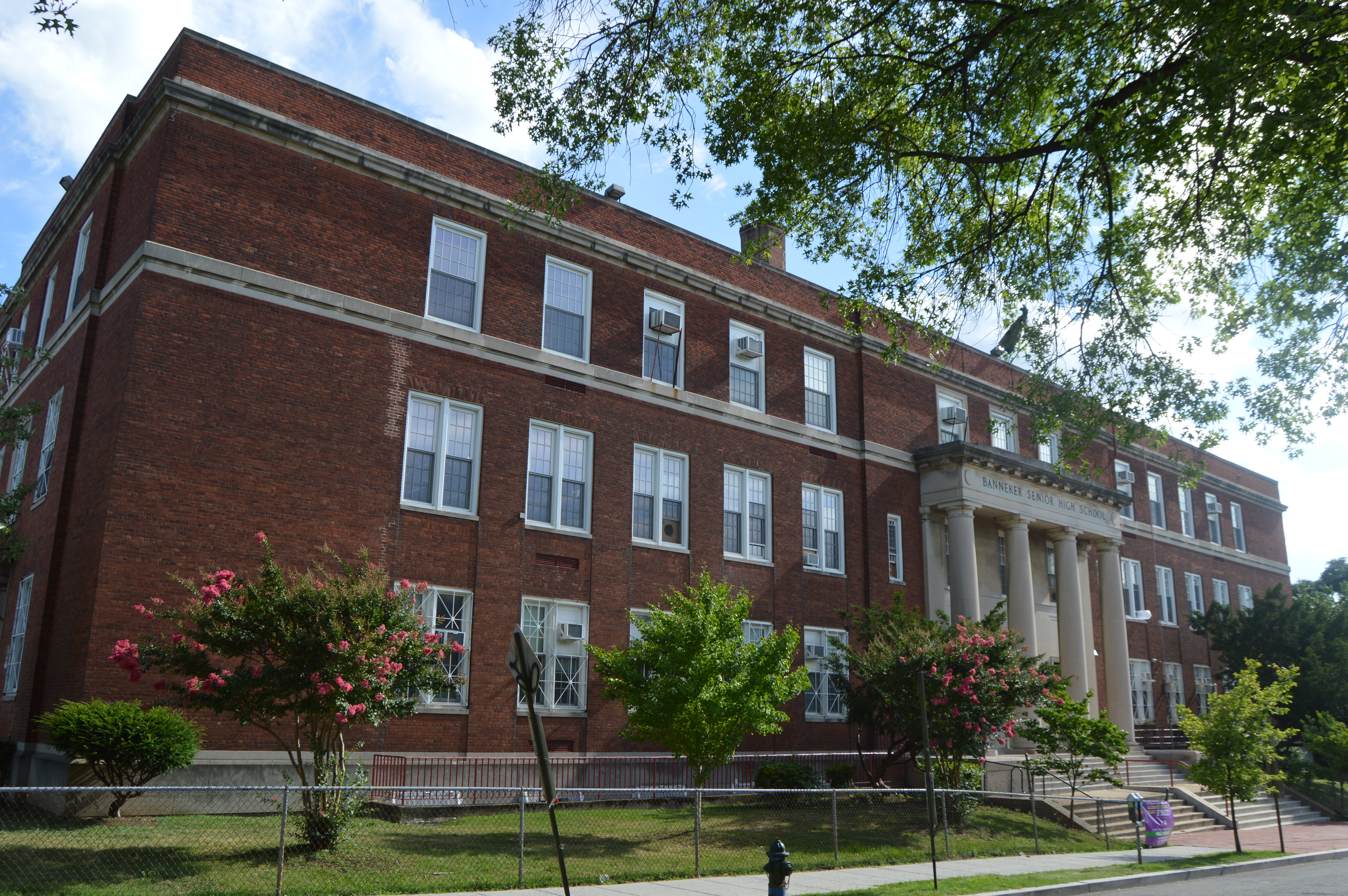
Benjamin Banneker Academic High School, Washington, D.C. (2017)

- Benjamin Banneker Academic High School, Washington, D.C.
- Benjamin Banneker Academy for Community Development, Brooklyn, New York
- Benjamin Banneker High School, Fulton County, Georgia
- Benjamin Banneker Lecture Hall, Baltimore Polytechnic Institute, Baltimore, Maryland

=== Middle schools ===
- Benjamin Banneker Charter Public School, Cambridge, Massachusetts
- Benjamin Banneker Middle School, Burtonsville, Maryland
- The Benjamin Banneker Preparatory Charter School, Willingboro, New Jersey

=== Elementary schools ===
- Banneker Group (23 elementary schools), St. Louis, Missouri
- Banneker-Doyle Career and Transition Center, Los Angeles, California
- Banneker Elementary School, St. Louis, Loudoun County, Virginia
- Banneker Elementary Science & Technology Magnet School, Kansas City, Kansas
- Benjamin Banneker Academy, East Orange, New Jersey
- Benjamin Banneker Achievement Center, Gary, Indiana
- Benjamin Banneker Charter Academy of Technology, Kansas City, Missouri
- Benjamin Banneker Elementary School, Chicago, Illinois
- Benjamin Banneker Elementary School, Kansas City, Missouri

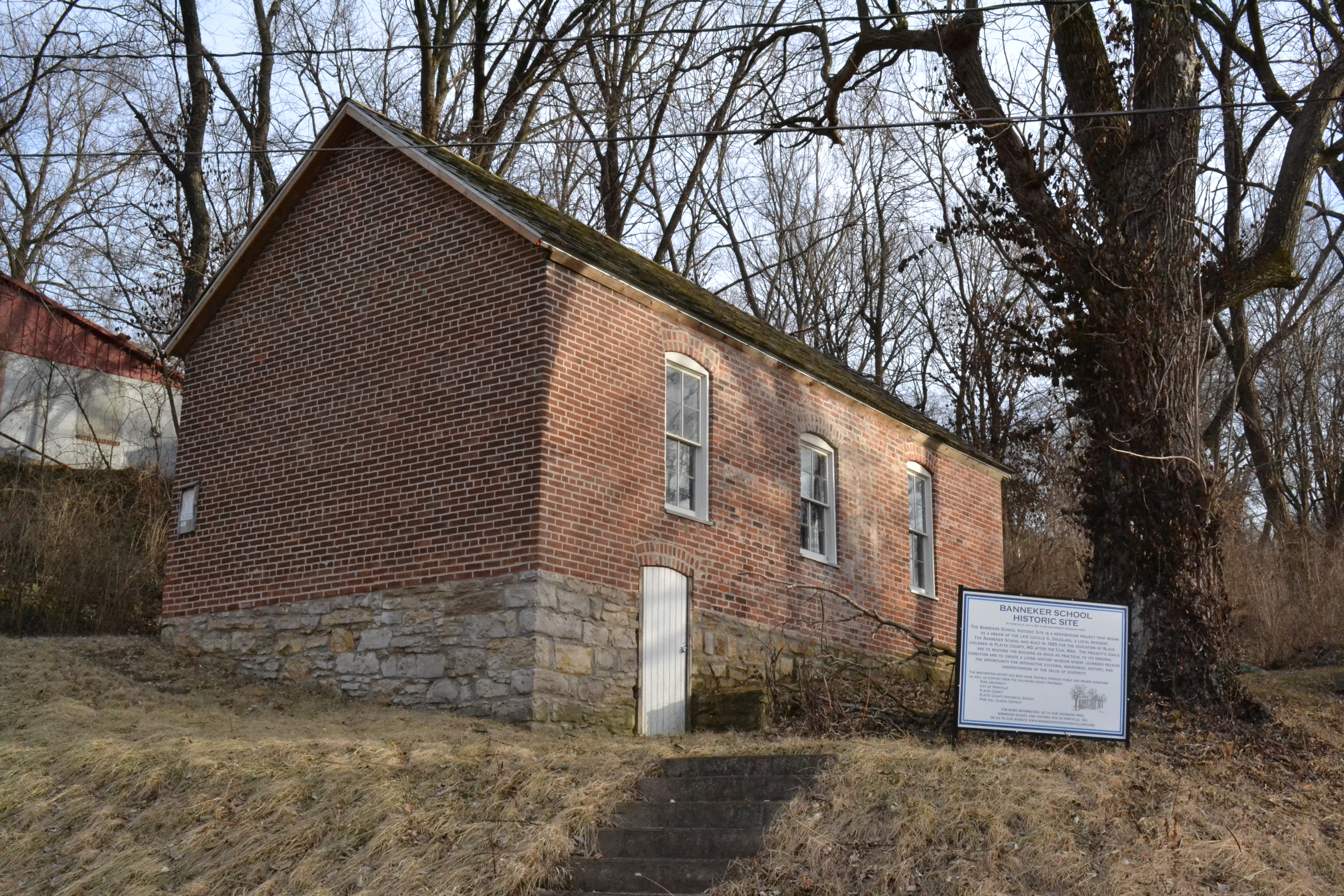
Benjamin Banneker School, Parkville, Missouri (2018)

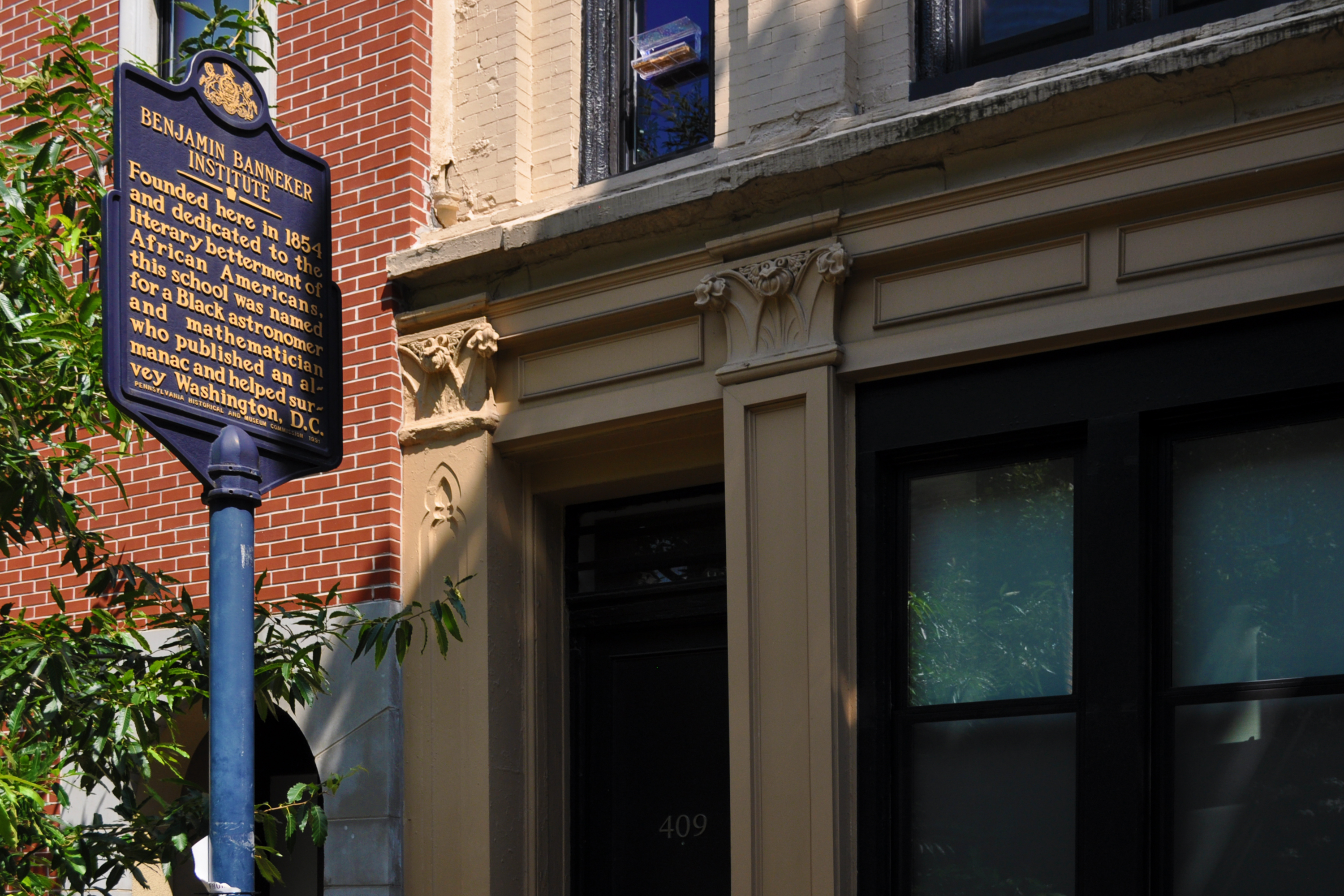
Benjamin Banneker Institute historical marker, Philadelphia (2021)

- Benjamin Banneker Elementary School, Loveville, Maryland
- Benjamin Banneker Elementary School, Milford, Delaware
- Benjamin Banneker Elementary School, New Orleans, Louisiana
- Benjamin Banneker School (now Benjamin Banneker Community Center), Bloomington, Indiana
- Benjamin Banneker Elementary School (P.S. 256), Brooklyn, New York
- Benjamin Banneker School, Parkville, Missouri (historical)

=== Other ===
- Benjamin Banneker Institute, Philadelphia, Pennsylvania (historical)

== Professorships and scholarships ==
The names of several university professorships and scholarships commemorate Banneker. These include:

- Benjamin Banneker Professorship of American Studies and History, Columbian College of Arts and Sciences, George Washington University, Washington, D.C.
- Benjamin Banneker Scholarship Program, Central State University, Wilberforce, Ohio
- Banneker/Key Scholarship, University of Maryland Honors College, College Park, Maryland

== Awards ==
The names of several awards commemorate Banneker. These include:

- Benjamin Banneker Award, Alabama Agricultural and Mechanical University, Huntsville, Alabama
- Benjamin Banneker Award, Temple University College of Education, Philadelphia, Pennsylvania
- Benjamin Banneker Award for Excellence in Math and Science, Metropolitan Buffalo Alliance of Black School Educators, Buffalo, New York
- Benjamin Banneker Award for Outstanding Social Commitment and Community Initiatives, American Planning Association, National Capital Area Chapter, Washington, D.C.
- Benjamin Banneker Legacy Award, The Benjamin Banneker Institute for Science and Technology, Washington, D.C.

== Streets ==
The names of a number of streets throughout the United States commemorate Banneker. These include:

- Banneker Avenue, Richmond Heights, Missouri (Note: Coordinates of Banneker Avenue, Richmond Heights, Missouri: 38°37′28″N 90°20′01″W)
- Banneker Avenue North, Minneapolis, Minnesota (Note: Coordinates of Banneker Avenue North, Minneapolis, Minnesota: 44.9899561°N 93.2975766°W)
- Banneker Court, Detroit, Michigan (Note: Coordinates of Banneker Court, Detroit, Michigan: 42°23′28″N 82°58′30″W)
- Banneker Court, Mobile, Alabama (Note: Coordinates of Banneker Court, Mobile, Alabama: 30°43′05″N 88°05′39″W)
- Banneker Court, Stone Mountain, Georgia (Note: Coordinates of Banneker Court, Stone Mountain, Georgia: 33°50′12″N 84°10′58″W)
- Banneker Court, Wilmington, Delaware (Note: Coordinates of Banneker Court, Wilmington, Delaware: 39°43′28″N 75°32′45″W)
- Banneker Cove, Memphis, Tennessee (Note: Coordinates of Banneker Cove, Memphis, Tennessee: 35°00′15″N 90°04′18″W)
- Banneker Drive, San Diego (Note: Coordinates of Banneker Drive, San Diego: 32°42′45″N 117°01′58″W)
- Banneker Drive, Williamsburg, Virginia (Note: Coordinates of Banneker Drive, Williamsburg, Virginia: 37°14′58″N 76°39′26″W)
- Banneker Drive Northeast, Washington, D.C. (Note: Coordinates of Banneker Drive Northeast, Washington, D.C.: 38°55′33″N 76°57′42″W)
- Banneker Lane, Annapolis, Maryland (Note: Coordinates of Banneker Lane, Annapolis, Maryland: 38°57′55″N 76°31′53″W)
- Banneker Place, Dallas, Texas (Note: Coordinates of Banneker Place, Dallas, Texas: 32°47′52″N 96°47′29″W)
- Banneker Place, Nipomo, California (Note: Coordinates of Banneker Place, Nipomo, California: 35°01′27″N 120°32′28″W)
- Banneker Road, Columbia, Maryland (Note: Coordinates of Banneker Road, Columbia, Maryland: 39°12′45″N 76°52′14″W)
- Banneker Street, Columbus, Ohio (Note: Coordinates of Banneker Street, Columbus, Ohio: 39°52′37″N 82°49′38″W)
- Banneker Street, DeQuincy, Louisiana (Note: Coordinates of Banneker Street, DeQuincy, Louisiana: 30°26′38″N 93°25′27″W)
- Benjamin Banneker Boulevard, Aquasco, Maryland (Note: Coordinates of Benjamin Banneker Boulevard, Aquasco, Maryland: 38°34′19″N 76°41′14″W)
- South Banneker Avenue, Fresno, California (Note: Coordinates of South Banneker Avenue, Fresno, California: 36°42′55″N 119°48′26″W)
- West Banneker Street, Hanford, California (Note: Coordinates of West Banneker Street, Hanford, California: 36°18′33″N 119°39′57″W)

== Real estate ==
The names of a number of buildings and apartment complexes commemorate Banneker. These include:

- Banneker Building, Columbia, Maryland
- Banneker Gardens, Cumberland, Maryland (townhomes/apartments)
- Banneker Homes, San Francisco
- Banneker Place, Town Center, Columbia, Maryland
- Banneker Place apartments, Washington, D.C.

== Businesses ==
The names of a number of businesses commemorate Banneker. These include:

- Banneker Energy, LLC, Duluth, Georgia and New Orleans, Louisiana (transportation fuel management)
- Banneker, Inc., Denver, Colorado (watches and clocks)
- Banneker Industries, Inc., North Smithfield, Rhode Island (supply chain management)
- Banneker Ventures, LLC, Washington, D.C. and Rockville, Maryland (design, construction and contracting management)
- The Banneker Group, LLC, Laurel, Maryland (general contracting and facility maintenance)

== Advocacy groups ==
The names and/or goals of several advocacy groups commemorate Banneker. These include:

- The Benjamin Banneker Association, Inc. (BANNEKERMATH.org), Philadelphia, Pennsylvania
- The Benjamin Banneker Center for Economic Justice and Progress, Baltimore, Maryland
- The Benjamin Banneker Foundation, Fulton, Maryland
- The Benjamin Banneker Institute for Science & Technology, Washington, D.C.
- Washington Interdependence Council: Administrators of the Benjamin Banneker Memorial and Banneker Institute of Math & Science, Washington, D.C.

== Other ==
^{Library of Congress} Benjamin Banneker mural in the Recorder of Deeds building in Washington, D.C.

Other commemorations of Benjamin Banneker include:

- "Banneker", a 1983 poem by Rita Dove (1993-1995 United States Poet Laureate)
- Banneker City Little League, Washington, D.C. (youth baseball)
- Banneker Institute, Cambridge, Massachusetts (summer program in astronomy)
- Banneker Literary Institute, Philadelphia, Pennsylvania (historical)
- Banneker neighborhood, Town Center, Columbia, Maryland
- Benjamin Banneker 1731-1806: His Life and Place. Exhibition: Corcoran Gallery of Art, Washington, D.C., February 8 — March 30, 1997
- Benjamin Banneker Honors Math & Science Society, Washington Metropolitan Area: Washington, D.C., Virginia and Maryland
- Benjamin Banneker Mathematics Competition, Pittsburgh, Pennsylvania
- Benjamin Banneker mural, Recorder of Deeds Building, Washington, D.C.
- Benjamin Banneker obelisk, Mount Gilboa Chapel, Oella, Maryland (see: Mount Gilboa Chapel). (Note: Coordinates of Benjamim Banneker obelisk: 39°16′30″N 76°46′44″W)
- Benjamin Banneker Science Fair, Philadelphia metropolitan area
- Benjamin Banneker: SW-9 Intermediate Boundary Stone (milestone) of the District of Columbia: Arlington County and City of Falls Church, Virginia.
- Benjamin Banneker: The Man Who Loved the Stars (1981 film starring Ossie Davis)
- Benjamin Banneker: The Man Who Loved the Stars (1989 television docudrama starring Ossie Davis)
- The Banneker Room, George Howard Building, Howard County Government, Ellicott City, Maryland (County Council meeting room)
- The Banneker Room, The Wayside Inn, Ellicott City, Maryland (guest room)

== See also ==
African-American culture
