= Alice Callis Hunter =

Community leader

- Born: 1898
- Died: July 1, 1989 (aged 91)
- Known for: civic leader and volunteer public servant

Alice Callis Hunter (1898–1989) was an American community leader in Washington, D.C. Hunter was the first African American appointee to the District of Columbia Department of Parks and Recreation, where she opposed racial segregation in the city's recreation facilities. Later, she was the first Black president of the District of Columbia League of Women Voters.

== Early life and education ==
Hunter's father, Rev. H.J. Callis, was born into slavery in Matthews County in Virginia.

Hunter moved to Washington, D.C. in 1916. She graduated from Miner Teachers College, and later studied at Howard University.

== Service and volunteerism ==
Hunter was president of the D.C. Federation of Parent Teacher Associations and of the parent-teacher associations of Cook Elementary, Terrell Junior High and Armstrong Technical High School, where her husband was a teacher and her son attended high school.

In 1942, Hunter became the first black appointee to the D.C. Recreation Board. Hunter was a vocal critic of the board's policy on segregation, but struggled to win over the white members of the board. Hunter was named to the 1945 Honor Roll of the Washington Afro-American for her "courageous fight against segregation in the District recreation setup." Hunter resigned from the Recreation Board in 1955 after 13 years. At a dinner commemorating her service, D.C. Commissioner Robert McLaughlin called Hunter the "patron saint of integration in D.C." and presented her with a certificate of merit from the Board of D.C. Commissioners.

After her resignation from the Recreation Board, Hunter and her husband spent two and a half years in Indonesia. Hunter volunteered as an English teacher for women while her husband worked as a teacher trainer as part of an effort sponsored by the International Cooperation Administration, the precursor for USAID.

Hunter was the first black woman to be elected president of a local League of Women Voters, serving as president of the District of Columbia League of Women Voters from 1963 to 1965.

In addition to her other volunteerism, Hunter served under the Roosevelt and Truman administrations on the Consumer Advisory Committee of the Council of Economic Advisors. During World War II, Hunter was appointed to the War Hospitality Committee by the D.C. Commissioners, and volunteered as an air raid warden and for the USO.

During her life, Hunter was awarded a medal for community services in human relations from the National Conference of Christians and Jews and a "Woman of Achievement" award from WETA-TV.

== Personal life ==
Hunter married Jehu Hunter, and had two sons, Alain and Jehu Jr. Jehu Hunter, Jr. was a scientist and a lifelong member of the League of Women Voters, serving as vice president of the District of Columbia chapter.
