= Ellicott's Mills Historic District =

Historic district in Maryland, United States

- U.S. National Register of Historic Places
- U.S. Historic district
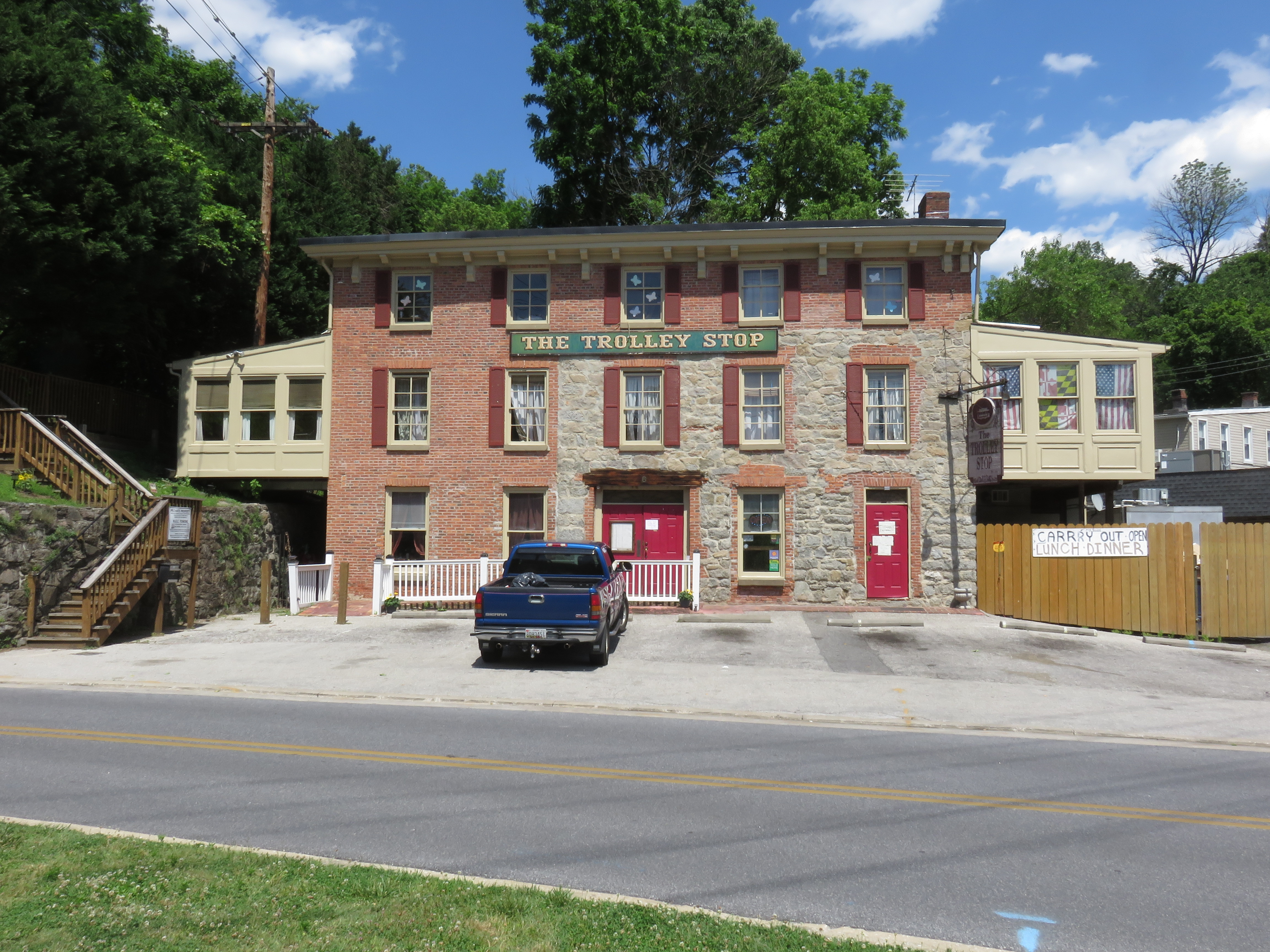
- Former 19th-century tavern pictured in 2020

- Location within Maryland Location within the United States
- Nearest city: Oella, Maryland
- Coordinates: 39°16′5″N 76°47′32″W
- Built: 1775
- Architect: Ellicott Bros.
- NRHP reference No.: 76000980
- Added to NRHP: November 19, 1976

Ellicott's Mills Historic District is a national historic district at Oella, Baltimore County, Maryland, United States. It is on the east bank of the Patapsco River, opposite Ellicott City. This historic district designation relates to the industrial operations of the Ellicott family from the 1770s through the mid-19th century. It consists of the sites of historic buildings including: an 18th-century building, a section of an 18th-century mill incorporated in a 20th-century factory, a 19th-century tavern, 19th-century workers housing, and an 1859 Italianate villa built by John Ellicott. Historically, these industrious mills were served by the major east–west route in Maryland during the early 19th century, the old National Pike. Also in the district is the mammoth multi-story Wilkins-Rogers Company flour plant, which is located on the site of the 1792 Ellicott Flour Mill, the first merchant flour mill in the United States.

It was added to the National Register of Historic Places in 1976.

== Gallery ==
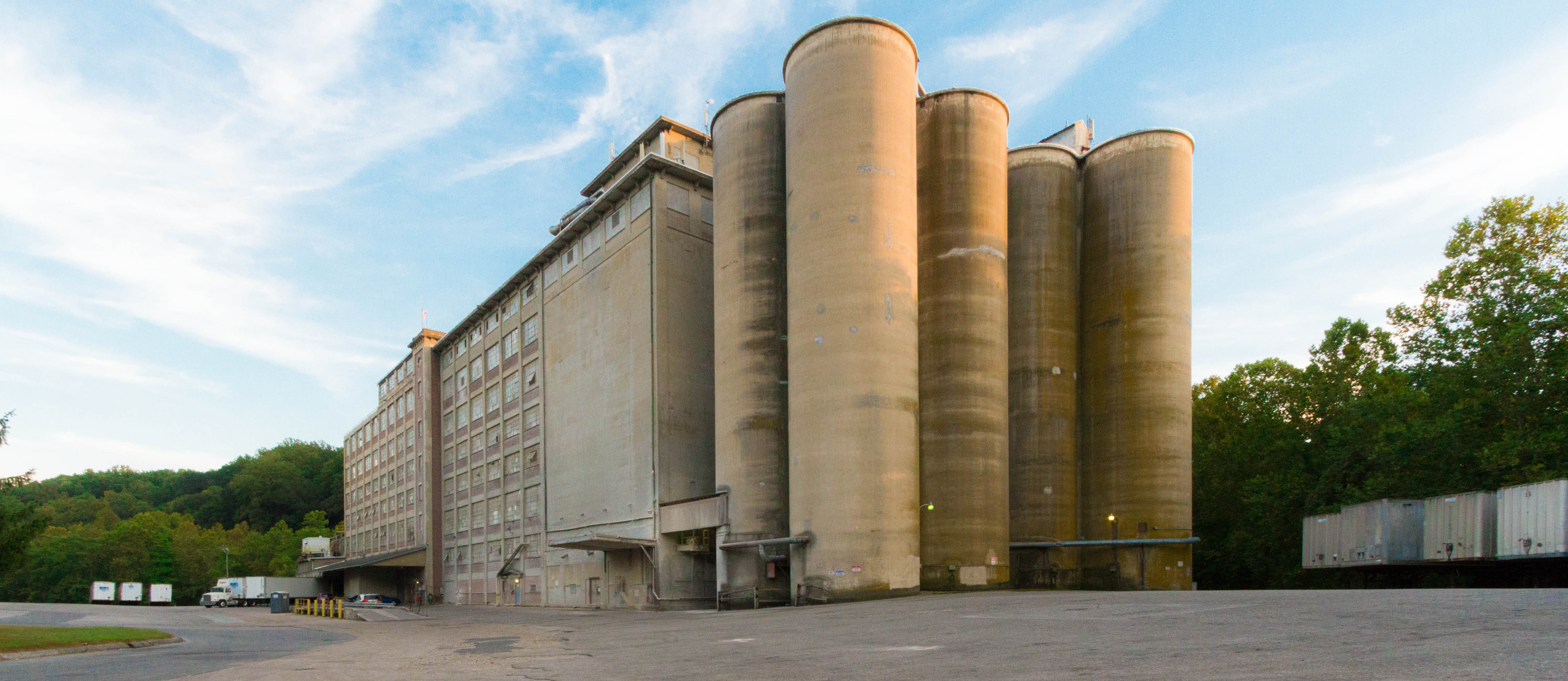
Wilkins-Rogers Company flour mill

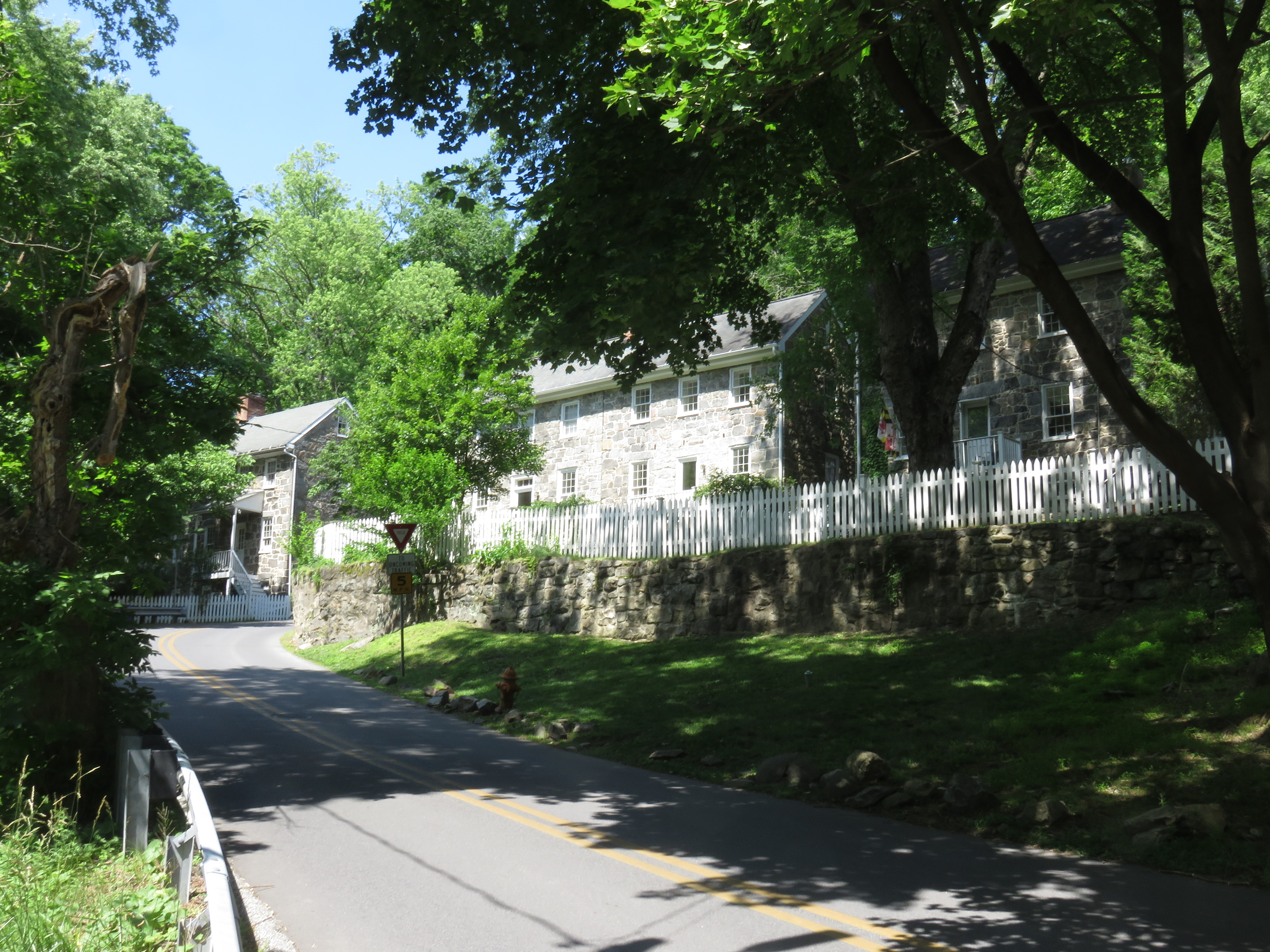
19th-century workers housing in 2020

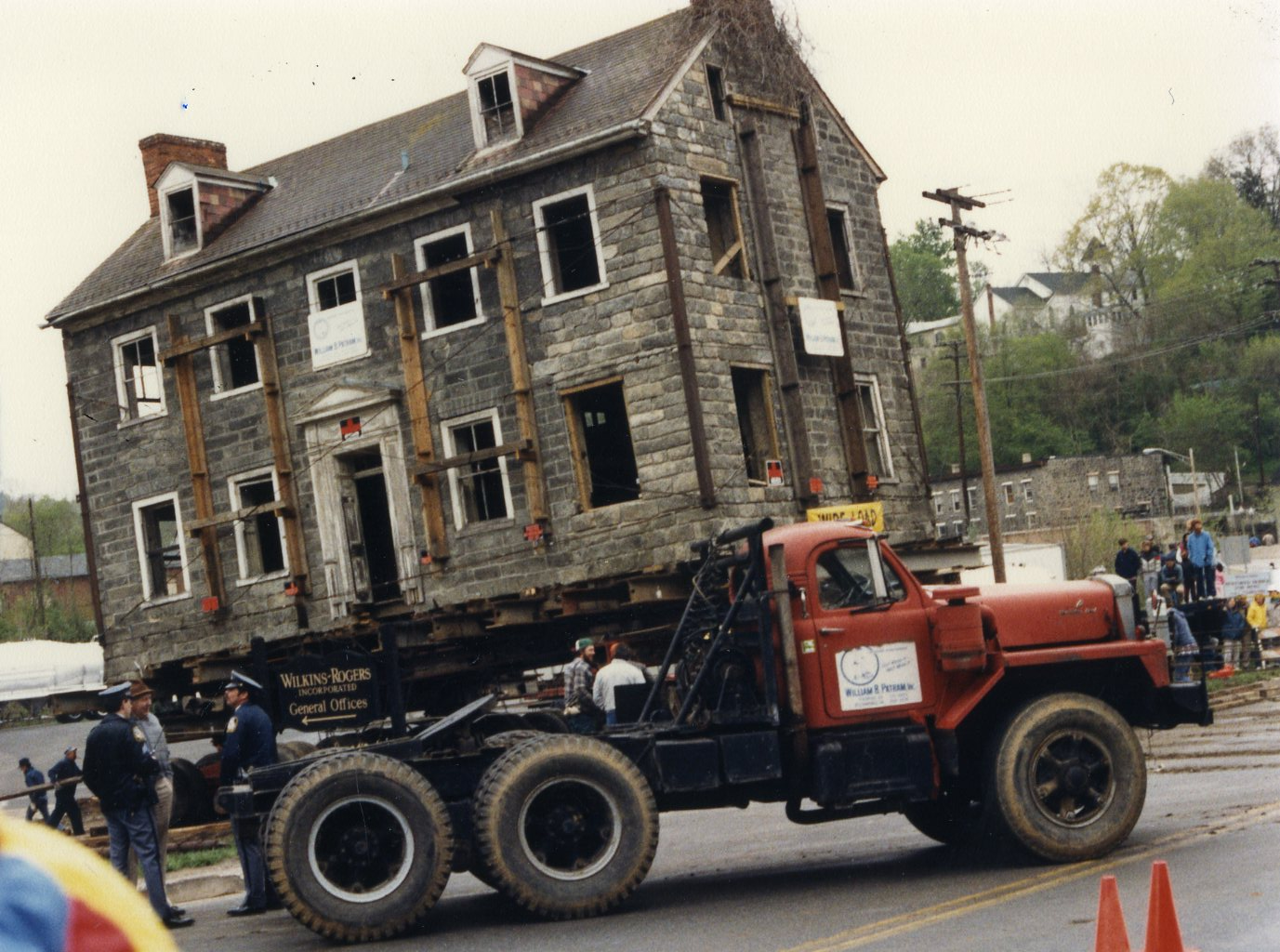
George Ellicott House being moved in 1987
