= Banneker Recreation Center =

- U.S. National Register of Historic Places
- D.C. Inventory of Historic Sites
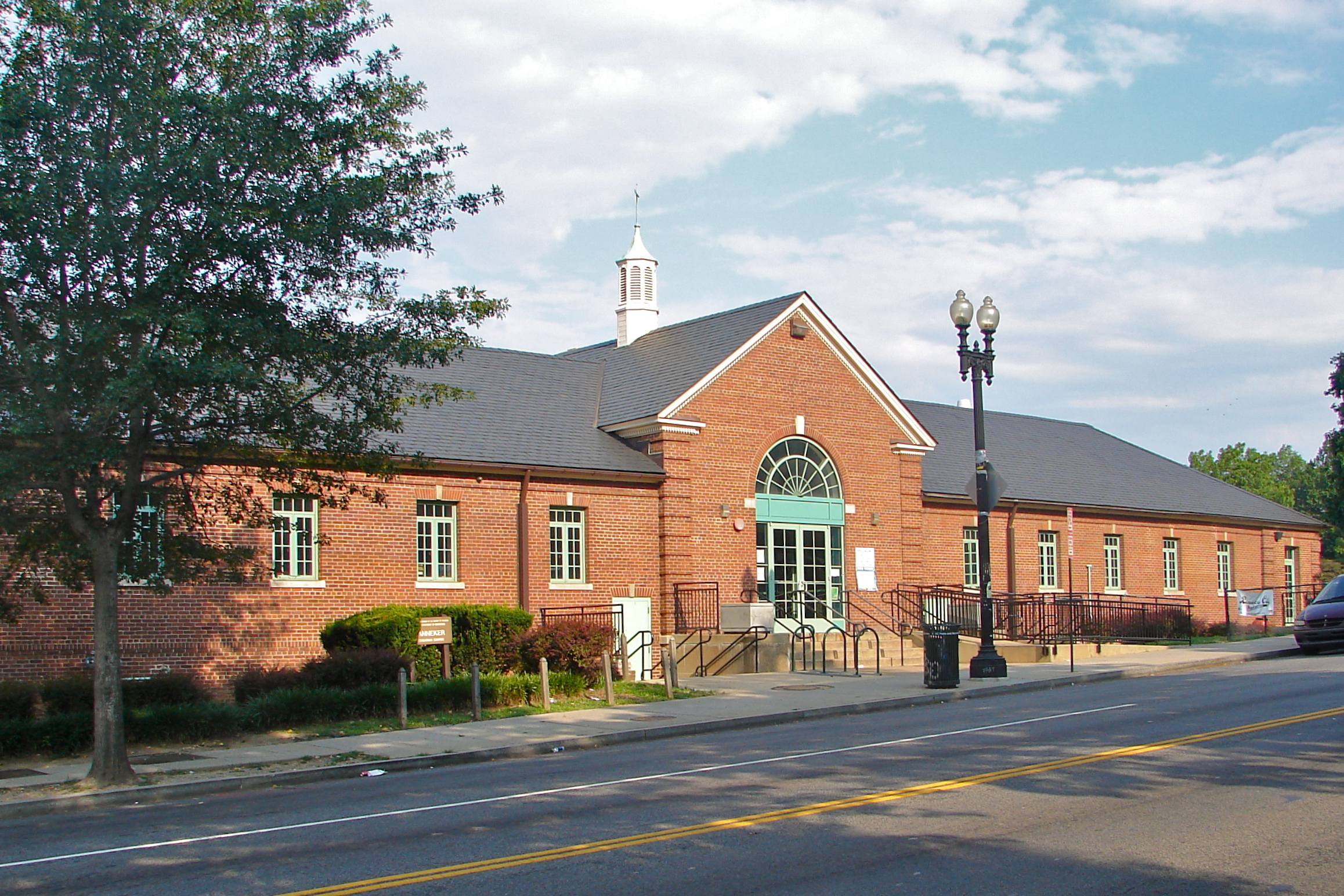
- Banneker Recreation Center in 2011

- Location within Washington, D.C.
- Location: 2500 Georgia Ave., NW; Washington, D.C.
- Coordinates: 38°55′20″N 77°1′25″W
- Built: 1934
- Architectural style: Colonial Revival
- NRHP reference No.: 86000876

Significant dates
- Added to NRHP: April 28, 1986
- Designated DCIHS: December 18, 1985

Banneker Recreation Center is a historic structure located in the Columbia Heights neighborhood of Washington, D.C. The building was built in 1934 and was named for Benjamin Banneker, a free African American who assisted in the survey of boundaries of the original District of Columba in 1791. It was known as a premier African American recreation center in the city. It was listed on the District of Columbia Inventory of Historic Sites in 1985 and it was listed on the National Register of Historic Places in 1986. The structure currently houses the Banneker Community Center, a unit of the District of Columbia Department of Parks and Recreation.
