= Mount Gilboa Chapel =

Historic church in Maryland, United States

- Mt. Gilboa Chapel
- U.S. National Register of Historic Places
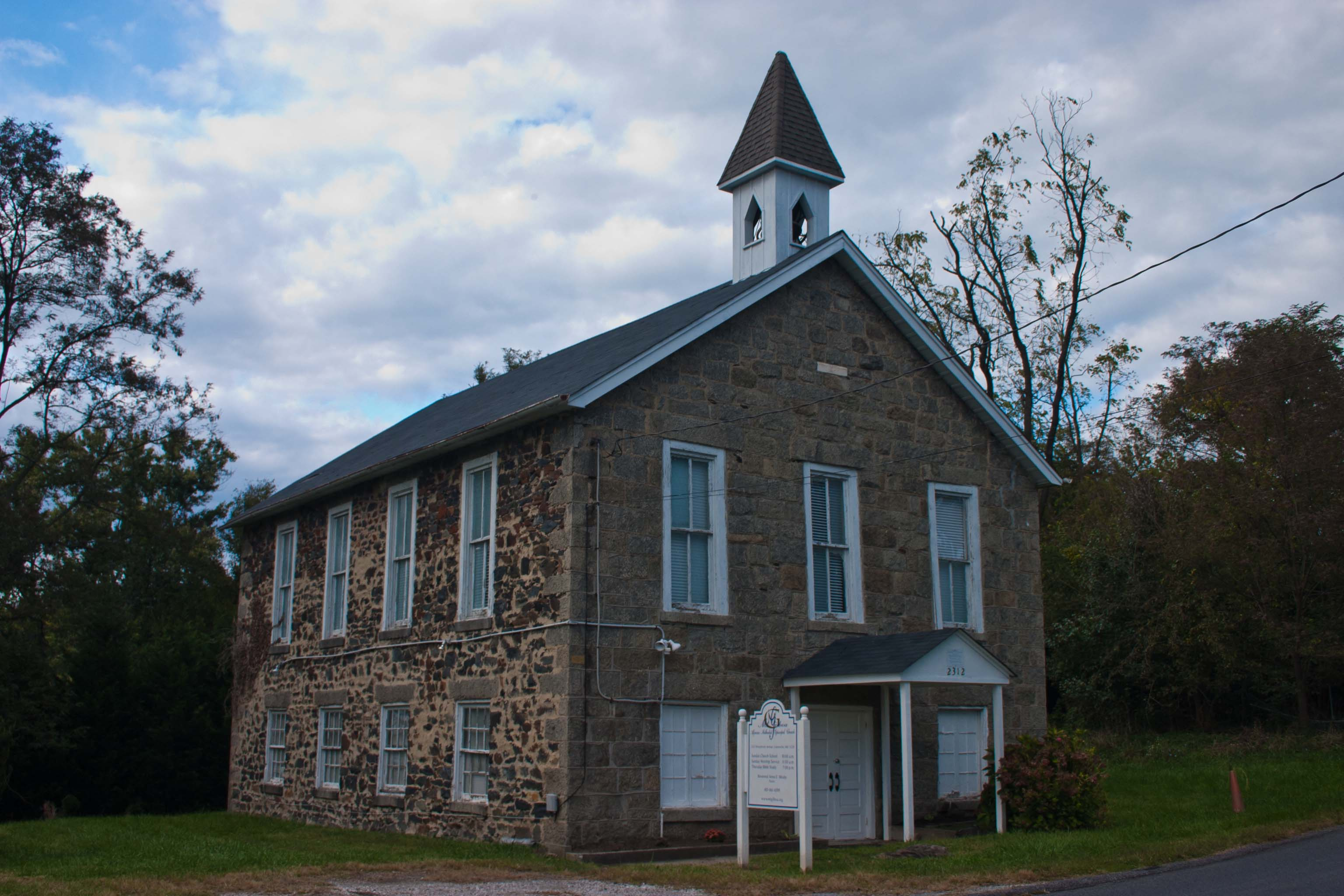

- Location within Maryland Location within the United States
- Location: 2312 Westchester Avenue, Oella, Maryland
- Coordinates: 39°16′29.75″N 76°46′42.9″W
- Area: 1 acre (0.40 ha)
- Built: 1859
- NRHP reference No.: 76000978
- Added to NRHP: October 21, 1976

Mount Gilboa Chapel is a historic African Methodist Episcopal Church located in Oella, Maryland, United States. It is a small stone church measuring 28 feet by 42 feet, built about 1859 by free African Americans. The front façade is ashlar masonry, but the sides and rear are of rubble.

== Background ==
The building is the replacement of an earlier log chapel of unknown origin. It is possible that neighbor Benjamin Banneker attended services in such a log building. An obelisk that the Maryland Bicentennial Commission and the State Commission on Afro American History and Culture erected in 1977 to commemorate Banneker stands in the church's yard near his unmarked grave. His grave is among less than two dozen marked graves in the graveyard adjacent to the chapel.

The chapel was listed on the National Register of Historic Places in 1976.

In April 2026, a fire broke out in the ceiling, causing significant damage throughout the interior of the building. The cause was determined to be faulty wiring. The congregation will be using a temporary location in Elkridge as repairs are underway.
