= Oella, Maryland =

Historic district in Maryland, United States

- Oella Historic District
- U.S. National Register of Historic Places
- U.S. Historic district
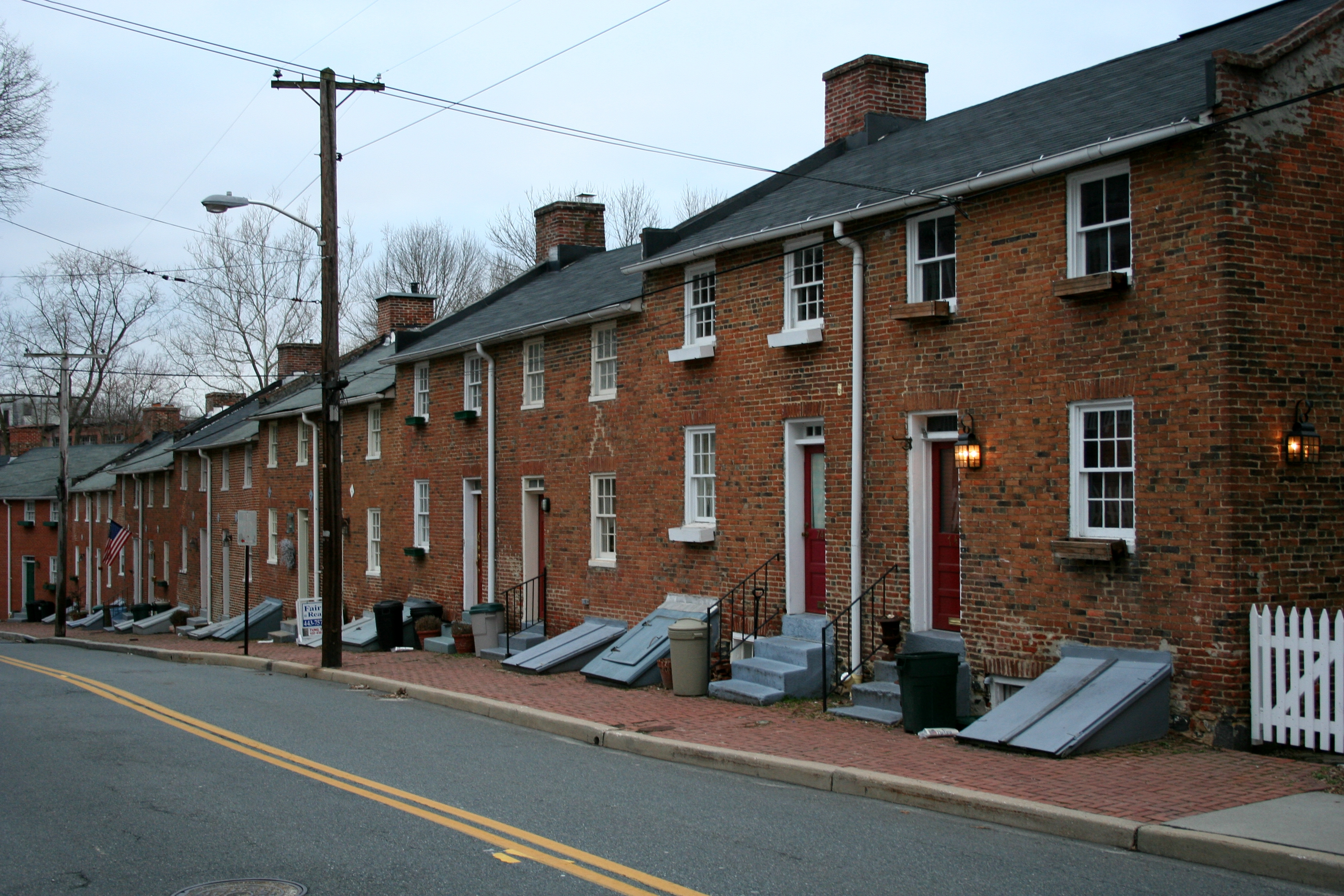
- Long Brick Row in the center of Oella, Maryland

- Location within Maryland Location within the United States
- Location: Oella Ave., Glen Rd., Hollow Rd., Oella, Maryland
- Coordinates: 39°16′32″N 76°47′14″W
- Area: 130 acres (53 ha)
- Built: 1812
- NRHP reference No.: 76000979
- Added to NRHP: November 7, 1976

Oella is a mill town on the Patapsco River in western Baltimore County, Maryland, United States, located between Catonsville and Ellicott City. It is a 19th-century village of millworkers' homes.

== History ==
Oella was founded in 1808 by the Union Manufacturing Company as a working class community for the company's mill workers. It was one of the earliest and most extensive cotton factories in the United States and used water-powered looms as early as 1819.

The Union Manufacturing Company was motivated by the Embargo Act of 1807 which required Baltimore merchants to manufacture finished goods in the United States rather than England. Stock in the company was issued to fund a series of industrial mills, the largest working with cotton and wool. Child and indigent labor was used reaching 150 employees in 1811. After the War of 1812 ended the embargo, cotton prices fell. A fire at the largest mill on 13 December 1815 took a decade to rebuild and recover from. The Mill rebounded with water driven looms, and expanded to three mill buildings before finally dissolving in 1887 after another drop in textile prices. William J. Dickey of Dickeysville (Gwynns Falls) purchased the mill in 1887, operating it as W.J. Dickey and Sons, naming the mill "Oella" after the first woman to spin cotton in America.

The Oella Historic District includes the village that consists of 19th-century workers' housing and one late 19th-century church. The only known 20th century building is the W.J. Dickey Company Mill constructed in 1919 as a rebuild after a 1918 fire. The plant was eventually used for the city. A drawing from 1812 by Maximilian Godefroy shows most of the stone buildings. The brick houses date from the mid-19th century, while the frame buildings were constructed at the end of the century. The Oella Methodist Church is a simple frame building with a tower on the northeast corner, which has been converted into offices. The Patapsco River continued to provide power to generate electricity until 1972, when Hurricane Agnes flooded the power plant. That same year, the Dickey Company ceased manufacturing.

It was added to the National Register of Historic Places in 1976. Also listed on the National Register at Oella are the Ellicott's Mills Historic District and Mount Gilboa Chapel.

Oella is along the route of the Trolley Line Number 9 Trail.

== Notable person ==
- Benjamin Banneker: scientist, surveyor, almanac author and farmer.

== Benjamin Banneker Historical Park and Museum ==
A park commemorating Benjamin Banneker is located in a stream valley woodland at the former site of Banneker's farm and residence at the eastern edge of the Oella community. The Baltimore County Department of Recreation and Parks manages the park, which was dedicated on June 9, 1998. The park, which encompasses 138 acres (56 ha) and contains archaeological sites and extensive nature trails, is the largest original African American historical site in the United States. The primary focus of the park is a museum highlighting Banneker's contributions.

== Geology ==
Oella is the type locality of the Oella Formation, a Late Proterozoic or early Cambrian schist.
