= District of Columbia Department of Parks and Recreation =

Park district

- D.C. Dept. of Parks and Recreation logo in 2010

Agency overview
- Formed: 1790 (legal predecessor); 1989 (current agency)
- Jurisdiction: Washington, D.C.
- Headquarters: 1275 First Street, NE, 8th floor, Washington, D.C. 20002
- Employees: 574.8 FTEs
- Annual budget: $48,095,331
- Agency executive: Delano Hunter, Director
- Website: http://dpr.dc.gov

The District of Columbia Department of Parks and Recreation (DPR) is an executive branch agency of the government of the District of Columbia in the United States. The department plans, builds, and maintains publicly owned recreational facilities in District of Columbia, including athletic fields, community centers, parks, playgrounds, swimming pools, spray pools and tennis courts. It also manages publicly run recreational sports leagues for youth and adults as well as provides various outdoor activities (such as boating and camping) for youth, adults, and senior citizens.

DPR has principal authority over the construction and maintenance of city-owned (but not federally owned) parks, and over nearly all public recreation facilities in District of Columbia. It oversees 900 acres (360 ha) of parks and 68 recreational facilities. This includes 25 outdoor pools, eight spray parks, and 10 indoor pools—all offered with no admission fee for residents of the District. In its fiscal 2011 budget, the department proposed eliminating 21 full-time workers (saving $1.67 million), but adding $1.056 million to provide additional summer youth health and safety activities.

== History ==
DPR's history is long and greatly complicated by the unique constitutional and legal nature of the District of Columbia. The department traces its history to the original three Commissioners who governed the District beginning in 1790, through several incarnations as executive branch and independent agencies, to the present department.

=== Federal antecedents ===
Under the Residence Act of 1790 (which established the District of Columbia), the Commissioners of the District of Columbia were given the power to oversee the establishment and operation of all public lands within the new federal reservation. Another 301 parcels of land (known as "reservations") were purchased by the federal government from these landholders the same year, and turned into parkland. Parks were a major component of the city under the L'Enfant plan for the City of Washington (produced in 1791). An Office of Public Buildings and Public Grounds was organized at the time of the District's creation to oversee construction of public buildings as well as create parks and other public spaces. In 1814, following the burning of major public buildings in the city by the British during the War of 1812, authority over public buildings was removed from the office and given to a new commission (whose mission was to rebuild the city as quickly as possible). The two bodies were merged into one again in 1816. Under legislation enacted in March 1849, the United States Department of the Interior was created and responsibility for Washington's city parks was given to this agency. The Office of Public Buildings and Parks continued as a subsidiary unit of the Department of the Interior. In July 1851, President Millard Fillmore appointed J.A. Downing the city's "Rural Architect," and charged him with turning many of the undeveloped reservations into public parks. Federal legislation enacted in March 1867 abolished the Office of Public Buildings and Parks and transferred authority over city parks to the United States Army Corps of Engineers. Four years later, the Corps created a "Park Commission" whose mission was to plant some 60,000 trees throughout the city. A reorganization of the Corps' city park unit in August 1876 led to better landscaping. During this period, the city Commissioners and the Corps shared maintenance and other duties for the city's parks. The three-commissioner form of the District government was created by federal legislation in 1878, but only purely local parks remained under the control of the commissioners. But in 1898, the Corps was given exclusive jurisdiction over these parks, too.

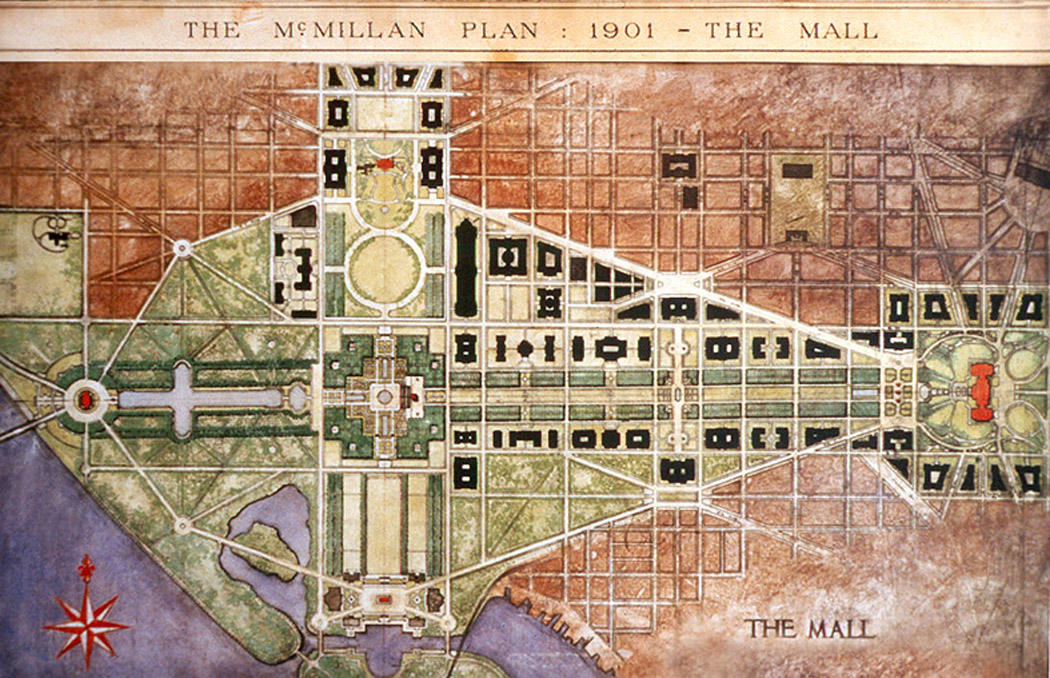
The 1902 McMillan Plan for the National Mall.

Although great strides had been made in the development of the city's municipal as well as federal parks, no comprehensive strategy had been followed. By 1900, competing visions for the further development of the city threatened to turn many of the capital's parks over to development. That year, the United States Senate established the Senate Park Commission (popularly known as the McMillan Commission after its chairman, U.S. Senator James McMillan). The McMillan Commission produced a report, known as the McMillan Plan, in 1901 which laid out a new, comprehensive vision for the development of parks in the District of Columbia. The McMillan Plan proposed that Anacostia Park, East Potomac Park, and West Potomac Park, areas created by dredged material taken from the Potomac and Anacostia riverbeds between 1882 and 1920, be designated as parks (rather than commercial land). The areas were duly set aside as parkland. Over the next few years, the President and Congress established several new agencies to supervise the approval, design, and construction of parks in the District of Columbia. The Commission of Fine Arts was established in 1910 to oversee and advise on the design of parks, and the National Capital Parks and Planning Commission was created in 1924 to oversee planning for the District.

The Army Corps of Engineers' Office of Public Buildings and Parks became an independent office within the executive branch under legislation adopted in February 1925. The new office, known as the Director of Public Buildings and Public Parks of the National Capital, reported directly to the President of the United States. Under Executive Order 6166 (June 10, 1933), President Franklin D. Roosevelt placed the independent office into the new Office of National Parks, Buildings and Reservations in the United States Department of the Interior. The name of the new office was changed to the "National Park Service" by an Act of Congress in March 1934.

On April 19, 1942, Congress passed legislation creating a District of Columbia Recreation Board, and lodging this board within the local D.C. government. Although the federal government retained responsibility for building and maintaining the city's local and federal parks, the new recreation board was responsible for designing, implementing, and overseeing recreational programs within these parks (at least, those which were purely local in nature). This law was formally implemented in 1949 with a memorandum of understanding between the National Park Service and the D.C. government.

=== Local antecedents ===
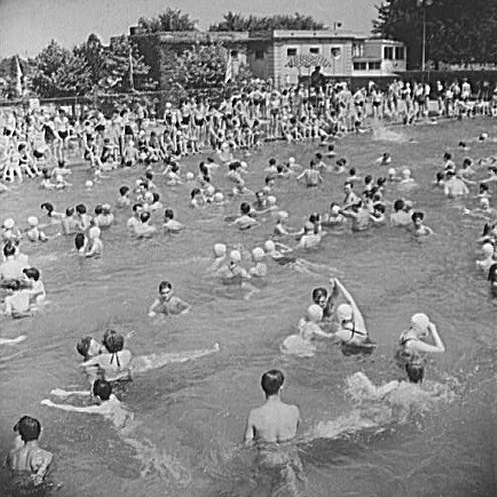
East Potomac Pool was a racially segregated whites-only municipal swimming pool in Washington, D.C., in July 1942

Even as Congress continued to exercise rather than delegate federal authority over parks and recreation facilities in the District of Columbia, the District government continued to press its own initiatives over these areas. In 1910, the District Commissioners pressed for federal legislation that would permit the city to build, maintain, and run public playgrounds (the construction of public playgrounds then being a revolutionary and new national movement). In March 1911, Congress approved legislation creating the D.C. Department of Playgrounds. In 1913, the Department of Playgrounds won congressional authorization to allow recreational programs at these playgrounds. Two years later, Congress established the Community Center Department under the D.C. Board of Education to provide adult recreation throughout the city (not just at public schools). Congress enacted legislation in 1932 authorizing the NPS to transfer land to the government of the District of Columbia (after following certain procedures) without Congressional approval, and vice versa. In 1939, Congress required that the Community Center Department and Department of Playgrounds merge to form the Community Center and Playgrounds Department.

At this time, the National Park Service still retained near-complete control over the construction, maintenance, and operation of most parks in the District of Columbia. This caused extensive friction between the citizens and government of the District on the one hand and the NPS on the other, and in 1939 President Franklin D. Roosevelt proposed legislation to transfer a number of parks to city control. This effort was unsuccessful, and in 1941 another attempt was made. This, too, was unsuccessful.

Federally and city-owned recreational facilities were strictly segregated by race from their beginning. As late as 1949, the D.C. Board of Recreation voted to stop offering swimming programs at privately owned pools if those pools were racially desegregated. However, in the early 1950s, the first attempts to desegregate public facilities began. In June 1951, the first of the city's public playgrounds was desegregated. After the United States Supreme Court's decision in Bolling v. Sharpe, 347 U.S. 497, in 1954 (which desegregated city public schools), public recreational programs, recreational facilities, and parks quickly desegregated (although isolated incidents of racial discrimination continued into the late 1950s).

Efforts to turn city government over to the people of the District of Columbia (an effort known as "home rule") grew throughout the 1950s and 1960s. On September 6, 1967, President Lyndon B. Johnson (who had strongly supported home rule) issued Executive Order 11379, which abolished the Commissioner form of government in D.C. and implemented a presidentially appointed mayor and city council system. When both the Democratic and Republican candidates for President in 1968 went on the record supporting home rule legislation, federal agencies began preparing to transfer a number of functions from the federal government to the city. In 1968, all local-use recreation facilities remaining under federal control were transferred to newly created D.C. Department of Recreation. Parks which solely served a local use were transferred to the D.C. Department of Public Works. This unified control over "local" parks and recreation at the city level for the first time in the city's history.

=== Post-home rule ===
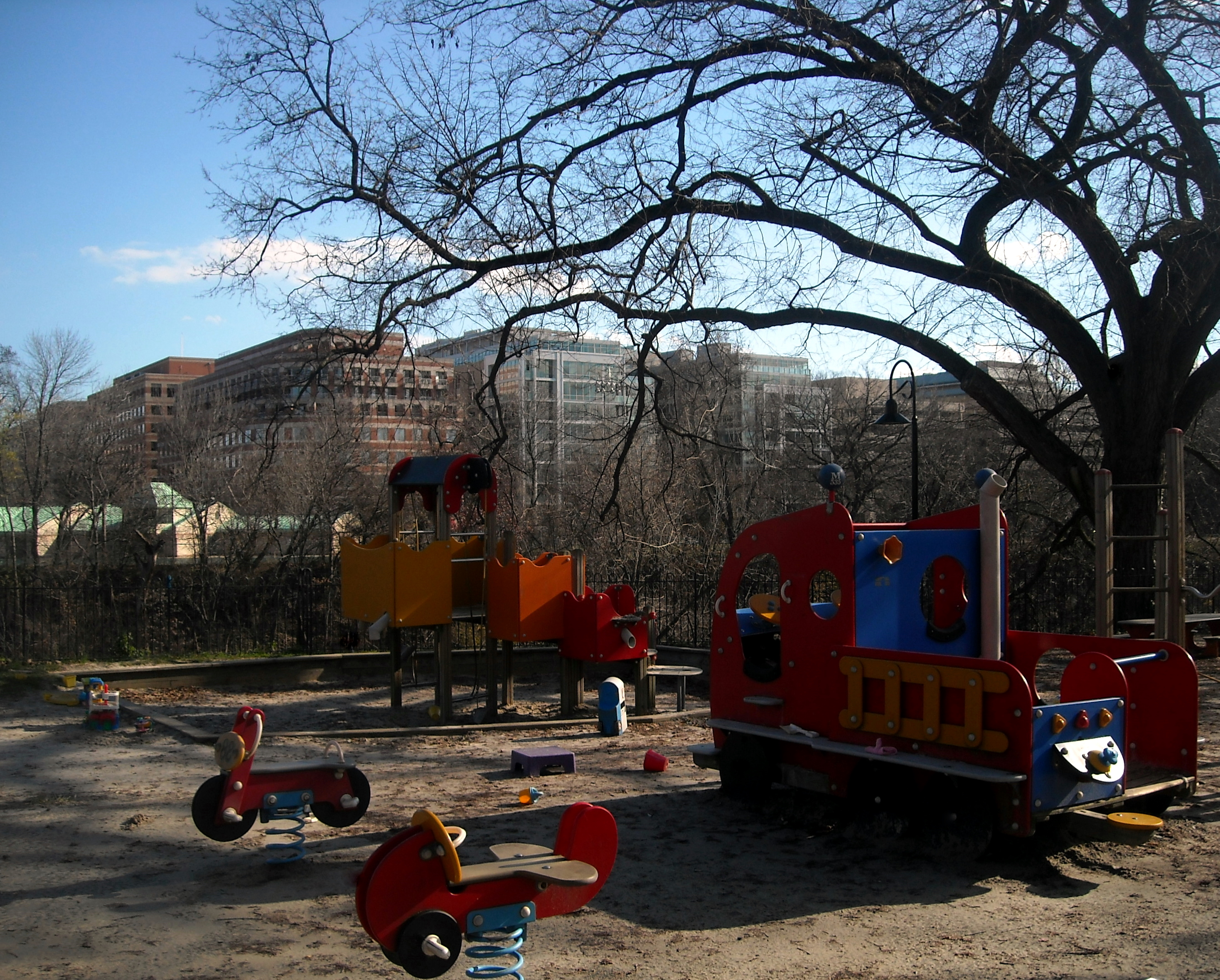
Playground equipment at Rose Park Recreation Center, with Francis Swimming Pool in the background, in the Georgetown neighborhood of Washington, D.C.

The D.C. Department of Public Works continued to administer the city-specific parks until 1989. The Department of Recreation administered recreational facilities and programs, but suffered from a number of problems. Throughout the 1970s, department leaders engaged in nepotism and cronyism, undermining the agency's efficiency and mission. In 1977, the department director was accused of requiring city workers to repair his home and other buildings owned by him. In 1988, the D.C. City Council passed the "Division of Park Services Act of 1988," which transferred the city-run parks from the Department of Public Works to the Department of Recreation, and renamed that agency the Department of Recreation and Parks. In 2000, D.C. Mayor Anthony A. Williams issued Mayor's Order 2000–20, renaming the agency the Department of Parks and Recreation.

These changes did little to improve the parks and recreation system in the city. Mayor Williams pledged in 1999 to turn the department around, but little had changed a year later. The department expended its entire $33.3 million operating budget with three months left in the fiscal year, but had barely spent any of its $18 million capital budget. The department struggled to execute maintenance contracts, leaving grass unmowed and trash uncollected. DPR Director Robert P. Newman was forced to resign in July 2000 after growing criticism, revelations that he had misused federal funds, and accusations that the department had not paid hundreds of teenage workers after missing payroll deadlines. DPR's Deputy Director, Neil O. Albert, was named Newman's replacement three months later. Albert's first years as DPR director markedly improved the agency's performance. More than $45 million in capital improvement projects were begun, leading to rapid improvement in existing facilities and construction on new ones. With Williams' permission, Albert ceased to submit construction contracts to the city's dysfunctional Office of Property Management and instead went to the District of Columbia Financial Control Board for contract approval. Albert also won approval from the Control Board for a six-year, $140 million capital spending plan. Many of DPR's programs improved rapidly during this period. By 2003, DPR and the D.C. public school system were the two biggest providers of subsidized meals to impoverished children in the city. (As of July 1, 2010, DPR was projected to supply 1,142,993 meals to city children in fiscal 2010.) In 2005, DPR began crafting its first five-year master plan in two decades. In 2006, the chief of the department's Operations and Maintenance division was accused of sexually harassing a number of employees for years, and Albert resigned from the department after Mayor Williams announced he would not seek election to a third term. DPR deputy director Wanda Durden served as interim director for seven months.

DPR received new leadership under the Adrian Fenty administration, which took office in January 2007. Mayor Fenty chose Clark E. Ray, director of the Mayor's Office of Community Relations and Services, to lead DPR in August 2007. Fenty charged Ray with aggressively opening new recreation centers and parks and rapidly expanding existing programs. Under Ray's leadership, the city opened more than two dozen basketball courts, baseball fields, dog parks, playgrounds, pools, and soccer fields. Ray won approval of a $58 million capital construction budget from the D.C. City Council for fiscal 2008 (more than a 400 percent increase from 2006) as well as approval for a three-year, $30 million capital construction. Ray also won a $300,000 increase in DPR's operations budget, bringing the agency's total for fiscal 2010 to $9.5 million (although that was down from $10.4 million in 2008). But despite these successes, Fenty fired Ray in April 2009 for not increasing recreational programming fast enough.

A month later, in April 2009, Fenty nominated Ximena Hartsock, Deputy Chief of the Office of Teaching and Learning in the D.C. public school system, to be the new DPR director. But the City Council defeated her nomination, 7-to-5, in October 2009. The vote marked the first time the council had refused to approve a Fenty nominee. Several council members said Hartsock did not have the qualifications to run the department. City Council Member Marion Barry implied in explaining his vote to reject the nomination that Hartsock, a Latina, was unfamiliar with African American culture and would be unable to adequately serve the city's majority-black population. Barry's comments outraged the D.C. Hispanic community, and led to counter-accusations that Barry himself was biased against Latinos. Fenty reappointed Hartsock interim director of DPR two weeks later.

As the controversy over DPR's leadership continued, the D.C. City Council discovered that Fenty administration had diverted tens of millions of dollars from DPR to the city housing authority, and then used the money to fund contracts with a firm owned by a Fenty associate. Council members said they learned of the funding diversion from DPR and D.C. Housing Authority staff. Under D.C. law, the City Council must approve contracts worth more than $1 million. City Council members alleged that at least $82 million had been diverted from DPR to the D.C. Housing Authority (DCHA). DCHA then awarded contracts to build recreation centers and athletic facilities to Banneker Ventures (a firm owned by one of Fenty's college fraternity brothers, Omar Karim), RBK Landscaping and Construction (owned by Fenty friend Keith Lomax), and Regan Associates (whose co-owners, Sean M. Regan and Thomas J. Regan, made significant financial contributions to Fenty's 2010 re-election campaign). About a dozen projects—including the $16 million Rosedale Recreation Center, $15 million Barry Farm Recreation Center, $12 million Fort Stanton Recreation Center, and $12 million Kenilworth Recreation Center—were funded through the funds transfer scheme. City Council members were outraged, and demanded that all the contracts awarded under the scheme be reviewed by the council. The council began debating emergency legislation that would bar the Office of the Chief Financial Officer from transferring funds to DCHA for 90 days, and require DPR to notify the council of any transactions greater than $75,000. At a hearing on the DPR funds issue, the city's purchasing officer called the administration's funds transfer abusive and ripe for fraud. A month later, in December 2009, the D.C. City Council stripped Banneker Ventures and its subcontractor, Liberty Engineering & Design (which is owned by another Fenty college fraternity brother who was also a paid campaign staffer on Fenty's 2006 election campaign), of the recreation contracts awarded through DCHA. The council ordered the city's Office of Public Education Facilities Modernization (which builds and repairs public schools) to finish construction of 10 facilities and DPR to finish three others.

Mayor Fenty nominated Jesús Aguirre, a D.C. Public Schools official, to be the new DPR Director on December 2, 2009. On February 23, 2011, Aguirre was selected by newly elected Mayor Vincent Gray to continue as department director.

== Structure ==
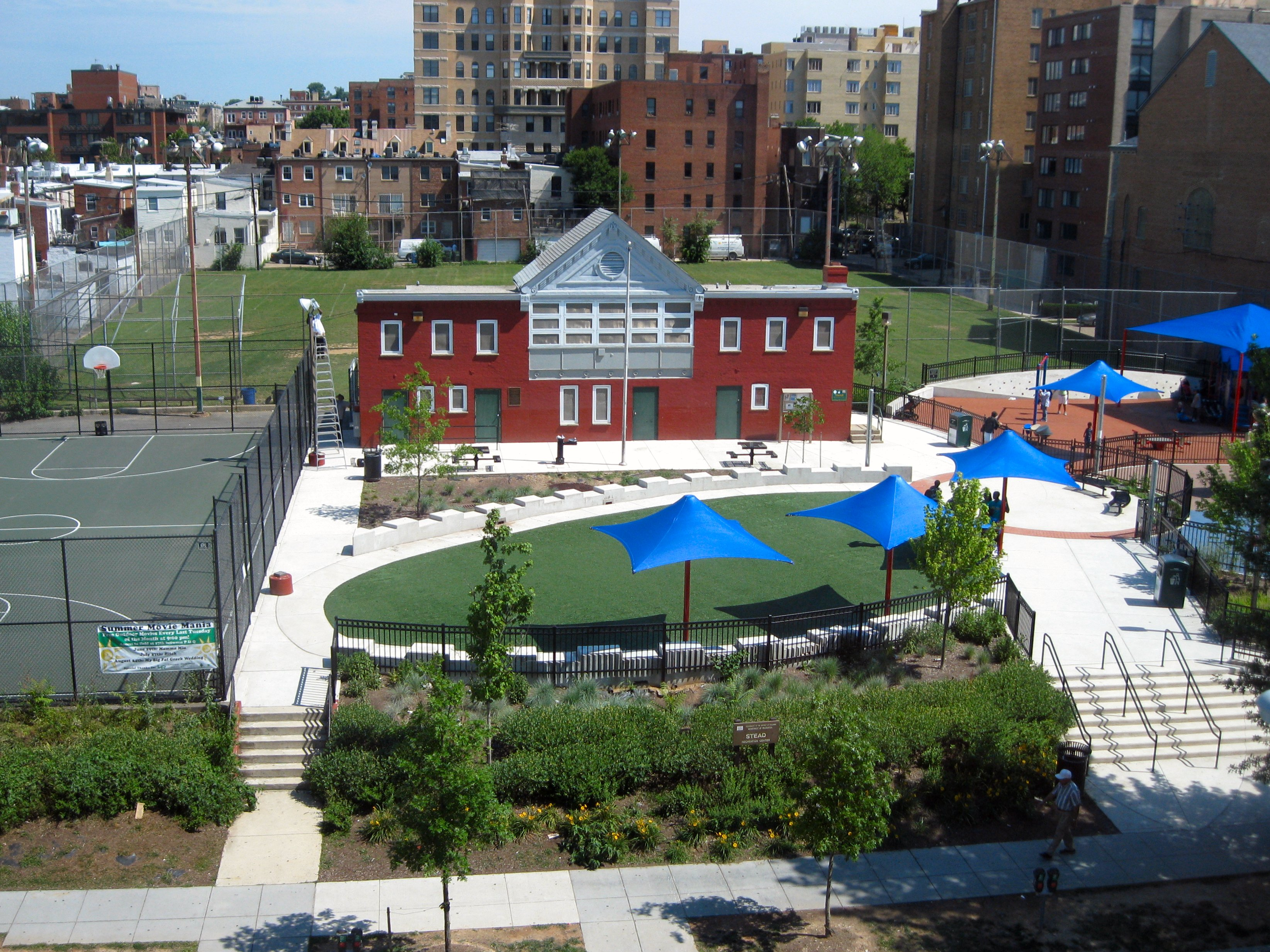
Stead Park Municipal Center near Dupont Circle

As of August 2010, DPR's Director was Jesús Aguirre.

The Department of Parks and Recreation has four divisions:

- Programs – Plans and implements programs offered by the department.
- Parks & Facilities Operations and Maintenance – Builds and maintains facilities operated by the department.
- Human Capital Management – Oversees the departmental staff's human resource needs, including, hiring, firing, discipline, training, promotion, grievances, and assessment.
- Office of the Director – Provides managerial oversight, strategic planning, budgeting, communications, and purchasing for the department. The Office of the Director also provides I.T. services to the other divisions, customer service to the public, approves permits for use of departmental facilities, and negotiates partnerships with nonprofit organizations to build and manage facilities and operate programs.

As of July 2010, the Office of the Director was divided into four units: The Director's Office, Community Relations (which oversees donations, sponsorships, and public-private partnerships), Data and Accountability (which provides information technology services and collects data on DPR programs), and Program Development (which coordinates DPR's relations with community and non-profit organizations and volunteers). The Programs division was DPR's largest, programmatically, with 11 programs: Recreational Services-Community Recreation (which provides supervision and equipment for unstructured programs); Aquatics Programs; Sports, Health and Fitness–Organized (which provides structured recreational activities); Youth Development–Roving Leaders (which provides outreach to children aged nine to 21 years old who are at risk of developing anti-social behavior); Urban Camps (which provides day- and over-night in-town recreation at city facilities); Cooperative Play (which provides day care recreational activities to children aged three to five years old); Children's Programs (which provides recreation with an academic component to children aged six to 12 years old); Teen Programs (which provides recreation to youth aged 13 to 18 years old, which implements the D.C. summer youth employment program in cooperation with the D.C. Department of Employment Services); Senior Services Program (which provides recreational, educational, and transportation services to people aged 50 years old or older); Therapeutic Recreation (which provides therapeutic recreational activities to persons with disabilities); and Nutritional Services (which provides subsidized and free breakfasts, lunches, and dinners to eligible children enrolled in recreational activities).

The Parks & Facilities Operations and Maintenance Division is split into two major areas. The first is the Operations program, which maintains seven activity areas: Site Management (which coordinates programming and maintenance needs), Aquatics-Operations (which provides safety personnel and equipment at DPR aquatic centers); Park Rangers (which provides safety personnel in city parks as well as exhibits, informational materials, and tours); Stagecraft (which provides personnel, lighting, sound, and other equipment for events requiring audio-visual support); Warehouse; Athletic Fields (which maintains DPR's playing fields); and Permit Services (which supervises the process by which non-governmental organizations may access DPR facilities). The second is the Facilities program, which maintains six activities: Site Maintenance (which provides custodial services, maintenance supplies, and maintenance equipment to DPR facilities); Aquatics–Pool Maintenance (which supplies specialized personnel, maintenance supplies, and maintenance equipment for the city aquatic facilities); Facilities Maintenance-Administration; Capital Improvements (which provides technical support for construction and capital equipment suppliers and contractors); Parks and Facilities–Trade (which provides oversight and training to the building and construction trades workers who maintain DPR facilities); and Parks and Facilities–Landscaping (which provides specialized training, purchasing information, oversight, equipment, and supplies necessary for maintaining plants and grounds at non-athletic field facilities).

Facilities' maintenance division usually renovates about eight city playgrounds a year. In October 2012, the city announced it would renovate 32 playgrounds over the next 12 months, after discovering $30 million in unspent capital funds.

The Human Capital Management Division maintains two programs: Agency Management (which provides administrative and budgeting support) and Agency Financial Operations (which provides financial management services to the department).

== See also ==
- Parks in Washington, D.C.
- National Capital Parks — National Park Service areas.
  - National Capital Parks-East
  - National Mall and Memorial Parks
  - Rock Creek Park
  - President's Park
  - George Washington Memorial Parkway
  - Chesapeake and Ohio Canal National Historical Park
