= Ellicott =

Ellicott may refer to:

== People ==
In England

- Charles Ellicott (1819–1905), Anglican churchman, Bishop of Gloucester and Bristol
- John Ellicott (clockmaker) (1706–1772), English clock and watchmaker
- Rosalind Ellicott (1857–1924), English composer

In the United States

- Andrew Ellicott (miller) (1733–1809)
- Andrew Ellicott (surveyor) (1754–1820), influential surveyor, son of the above
- Bryce Ellicott, pseudonym of planetary scientist JA Grier
- Elizabeth King Ellicott (1858–1914), suffragist
- Henry Jackson Ellicott (1847–1901), sculptor, great-grandson of Andrew Ellicott (surveyor).
- John Ellicott (miller) (1739–1794), son of Andrew Ellicott.
- Joseph Ellicott (miller) (1732–1780), together with his brothers John and Andrew, founded Ellicott's Mills, Maryland in 1772
- Joseph Ellicott (surveyor) (1760–1826), surveyor and land agent for the Holland Land Company, son of Joseph Ellicott (miller).
- Ellicott R. Stillman (1844–1911), American politician

== Places ==
- Ellicott City, Maryland, a census-defined place, formerly Ellicott's Mills, named after its founders
- Ellicott, Colorado, a town
- Ellicott Complex, a dormitory at the University at Buffalo
- Ellicott Creek, a stream in Western New York
- Ellicott, New York, a town in Chautauqua County
- Ellicott Rock Wilderness, named for Ellicott Rock, on the east bank of the Chattooga River on which surveyor Andrew Ellicott chiseled a mark in 1811 to determine the border between Georgia and North Carolina
- Ellicottville (village), New York, in Cattaraugus County
- Ellicottville (town), New York, in Cattaraugus County

== Other uses ==
- Ellicott Square Building, in Buffalo, New York
- Ellicott Dredges, American manufacturer
