= Benjamin Banneker =

American scientist, surveyor and farmer (1731–1806)

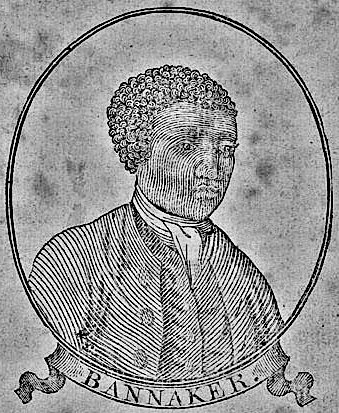
- Woodcut portrait of Bannaker, 1795
- Born: November 9, 1731; Baltimore County, Province of Maryland, British America
- Died: October 19, 1806 (aged 74); Oella, Baltimore County, Maryland, U.S.
- Other name: Benjamin Bannaker
- Occupations: almanac author, surveyor, farmer
- Parents: Robert (father); Mary Banneky (mother)

Benjamin Banneker (November 9, 1731 – October 19, 1806) was an American naturalist, mathematician, astronomer and almanac author. A landowner, he also worked as a surveyor and farmer.

Born in Baltimore County, Maryland, to a free African-American mother and a father who had formerly been enslaved, Banneker had little or no formal education and was largely self-taught. He became known for assisting Major Andrew Ellicott in a survey that established the original borders of the District of Columbia, the federal capital district of the United States.

Banneker's knowledge of astronomy helped him author a commercially successful series of almanacs. He corresponded with Thomas Jefferson on the topics of slavery and racial equality. Abolitionists and advocates of racial equality promoted and praised Banneker's works. Although a fire on the day of Banneker's funeral destroyed many of his papers and belongings, one of his journals and several of his remaining artifacts survived.

Banneker became a folk-hero after his death, leading to many accounts of his life being exaggerated or embellished. The names of parks, schools and streets commemorate him and his works, as do other tributes.

== Biography ==
=== Early life ===
Banneker was born on November 9, 1731, in Baltimore County, Maryland, to Mary Banneky, a free black woman, and Robert, a freed slave from Guinea who died in 1759.

There are two conflicting accounts of Banneker's family history. Banneker himself and his earliest biographers described him as having only African ancestry. None of Banneker's surviving papers describe a white ancestor or identify the name of his grandmother. However, two lines of later research both suggest that Banneker's mother was the daughter of a white woman and an African slave, although they differ as to whether the Banneker surname came from his mother or father and the origin of the name, which could be from Banaka, a small village in the present-day Klay District of Bomi County in northwestern Liberia that had once participated in the African slave trade or "Banaka", the home of the Vai people, who have lived there since about 1500 when they left the Mali Empire.

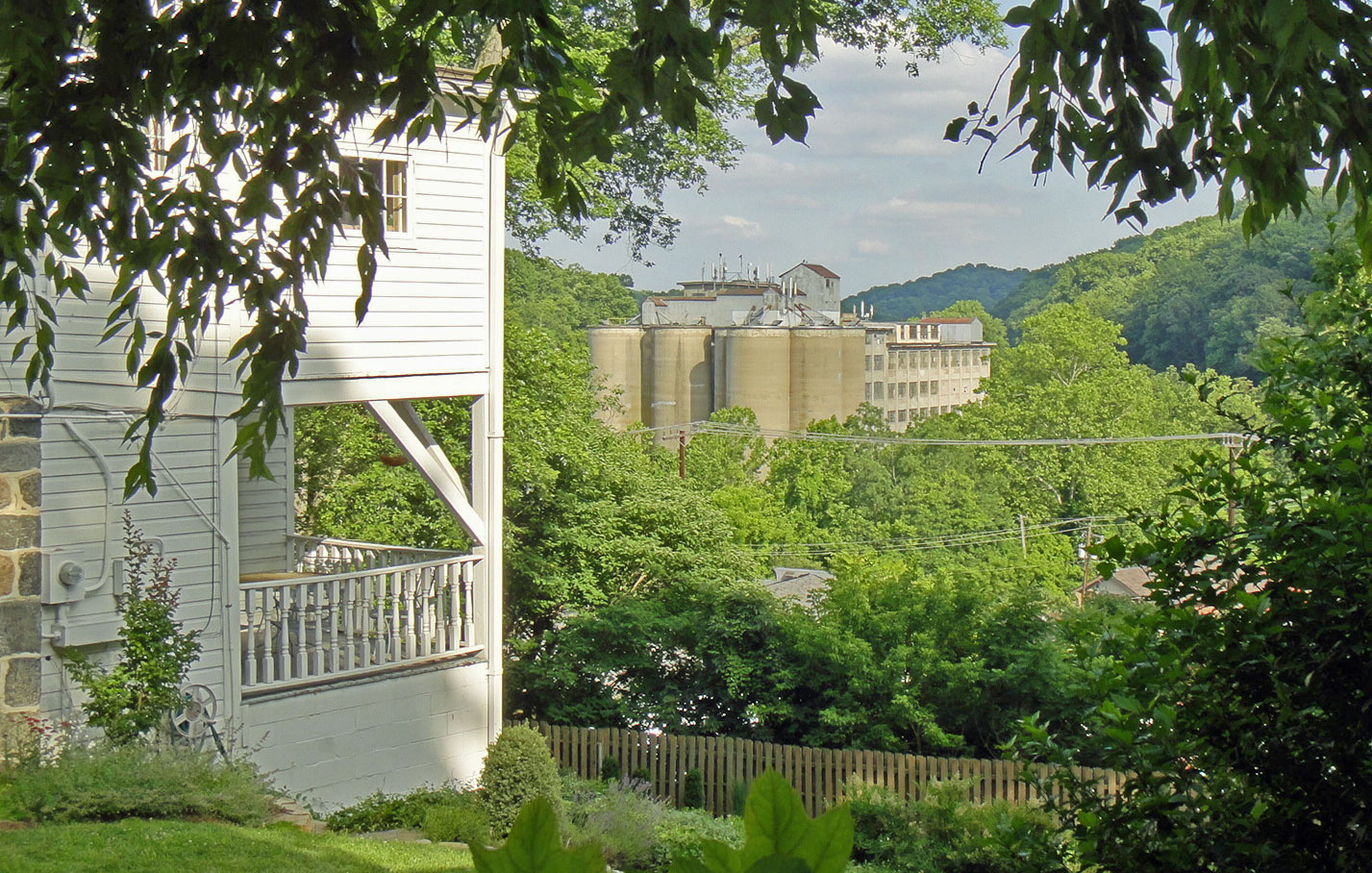
View of the Patapsco Valley from Ellicott City (June 2012)

In 1737, when he was 6, Banneker was named on the deed of his family's 100-acre (0.40 km^{2}) farm in the Patapsco Valley in rural Baltimore County.

In 1791, a letter writer stated that Banneker's parents had sent him to an obscure school where he learned reading, writing and arithmetic as far as double position. In contrast, unverified accounts, first appeared in books published more than 140 years after Banneker's death suggest that, as a young teenager, Banneker met and befriended Peter Heinrich, a Quaker who later established a school near the Banneker family farm. These accounts state that Heinrich shared his personal library and provided Banneker with his only classroom instruction. Banneker's formal education (if any) presumably ended when he was old enough to help on his family's farm.

=== Notable works ===
Around 1753, at about the age of 21, Banneker reportedly completed a wooden clock that struck on the hour. He appears to have modelled his clock from a borrowed pocket watch by carving each piece to scale. The clock continued to work until his death.

After his father died in 1759, Banneker lived with his mother and sisters. Records indicate that in 1768 and 1773, he was living in Baltimore.

In 1772, brothers Andrew Ellicott, John Ellicott and Joseph Ellicott moved from Bucks County, Pennsylvania, and bought land along the Patapsco Falls near Banneker's farm on which to construct gristmills, around which the village of Ellicott's Mills (now Ellicott City) subsequently developed. The Ellicotts were Quakers who held the same views on racial equality as did many of their faith. Banneker studied the mills and became acquainted with their proprietors. In 1788, George Ellicott, a son of Andrew Ellicott, loaned Banneker books and equipment to begin a more formal study of astronomy. During the following year, Banneker sent George his work calculating a solar eclipse.

In 1790, Banneker prepared an ephemeris for 1791, which he hoped would be placed within a published almanac. However, he was unable to find a printer that was willing to publish and distribute the work.

==== Survey of the original boundaries of the District of Columbia ====
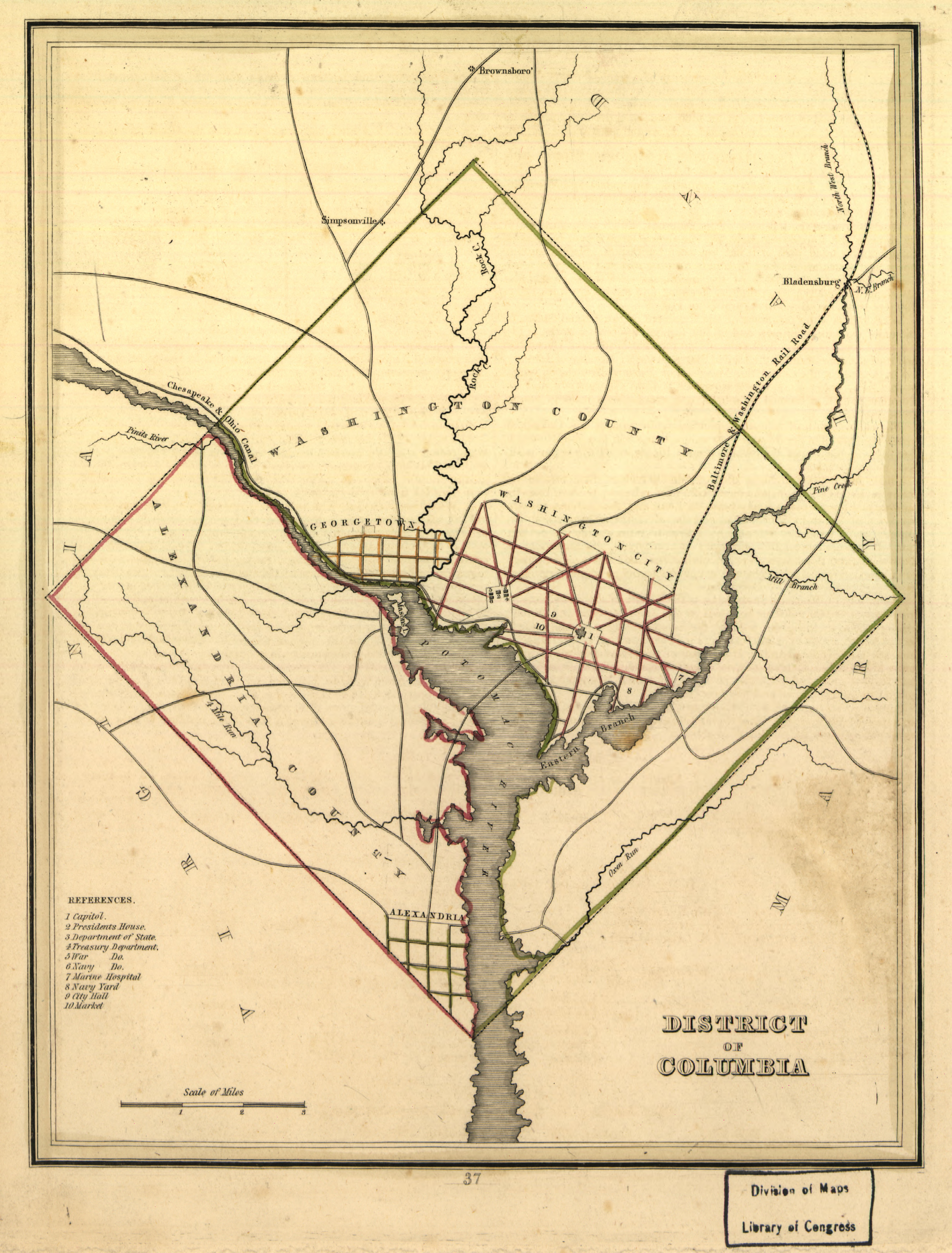
Library of Congress 1835 map of the District of Columbia showing Washington City in its center, Georgetown to the west of the city, and the town of Alexandria in the District's south corner.

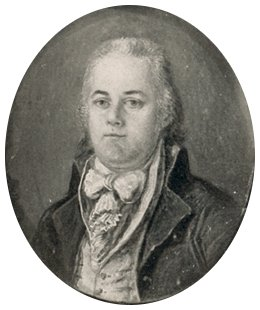
1799 portrait of Andrew Ellicott

In early 1791, U.S. Secretary of State, Thomas Jefferson, asked surveyor Maj. Andrew Ellicott to survey an area for a new federal district. In February 1791, Ellicott left a survey in western New York to begin the district survey and hired Banneker to assist him, advancing him $60 for travel expenses to, and at, Georgetown.

The territory that became the original District of Columbia was formed from land along the Potomac River ceded by the states of Maryland and Virginia to the federal government (see: Founding of Washington, D.C.). a square to measure 10 miles (16 km) on each side, totaling 100 square miles (260 km^{2}). Ellicott's team placed boundary marker stones at or near every mile point along the borders of the new capital territory.

Banneker's role in the survey isn't entirely certain. Some biographers have stated that Banneker's duties consisted primarily of making astronomical observations and calculations to establish base points, including one at Jones Point in Alexandria, Virginia, where the survey started and where the south corner stone was to be located. They have also stated that Banneker maintained a clock that he used to relate points on the ground to the positions of stars at specific times.

However, there is little documentation to confirm Banneker's role and a news report covering the April 15 dedication ceremony for the first boundary stone (the south corner stone) credits Andrew Ellicott with "ascertain[ing] the precise point from which the first line of the district was to proceed" and did not mention Banneker.

Banneker left the boundary survey in April 1791 due to other commitments, particularly the calculation of an ephemeris for the year of 1792. The arrival of spring also required him to direct more attention to his farm than was needed during the winter. Banneker, therefore, returned to his home near Ellicott's Mills.

Andrew Ellicott's two younger brothers, who usually assisted him, had completed the New York survey about the same time and were able to join the survey of the federal district. The surveying team laid the remaining Virginia marker stones in 1791, laying the Maryland stones and completed the boundary survey in 1792.

==== Banneker's almanacs ====
After returning to Ellicott's Mills, Banneker made astronomical calculations that predicted eclipses and planetary conjunctions for inclusion in an almanac and ephemeris for the year of 1792. To aid Banneker in his efforts to have his almanac published, Andrew Ellicott (who had been authoring almanacs and ephemerides of his own since 1780) forwarded Banneker's ephemeris to James Pemberton, the president of the Pennsylvania Society for Promoting the Abolition of Slavery and for the Relief of Free Negroes Unlawfully Held in Bondage.

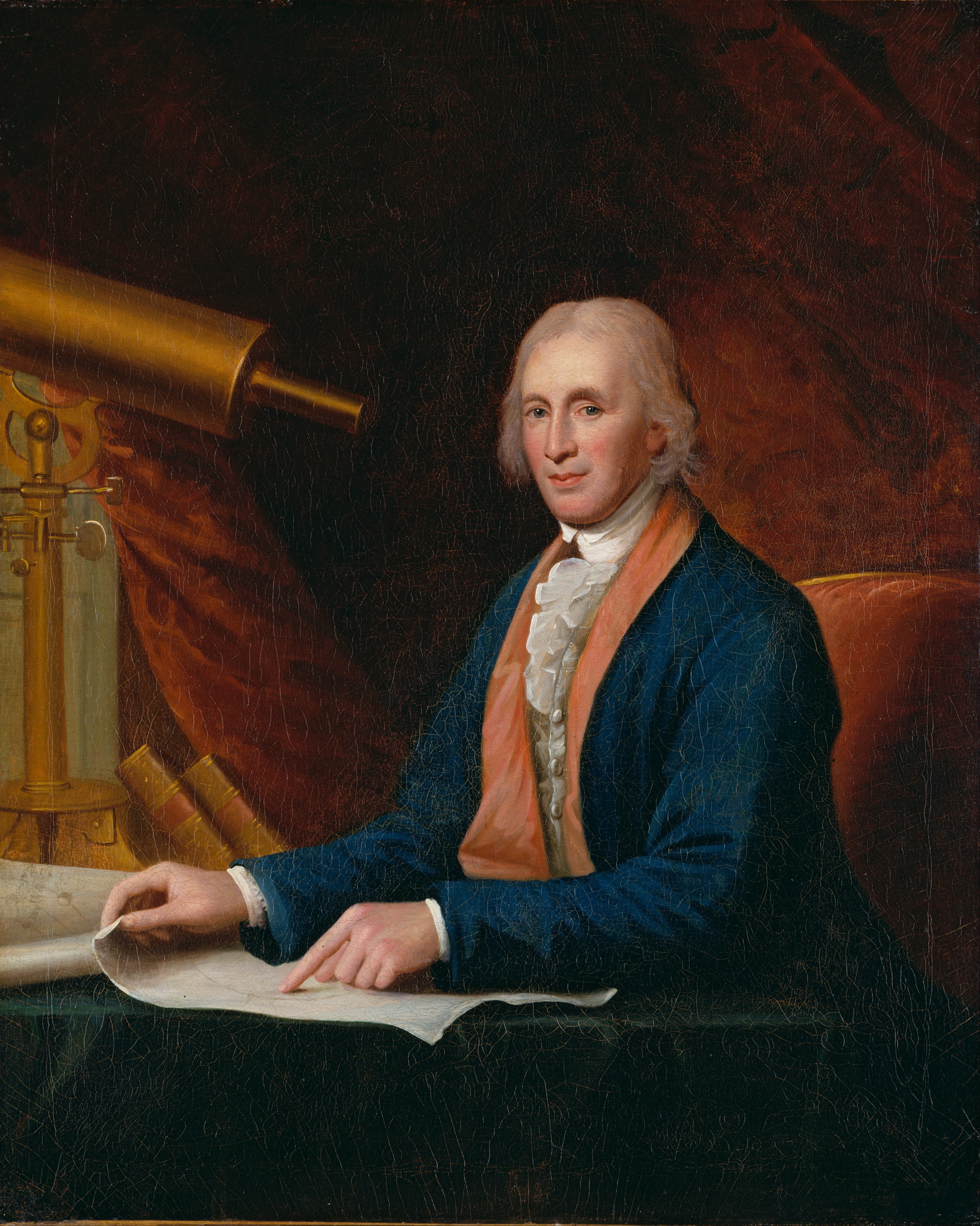
^{National Portrait Gallery} 1796 oil portrait of David Rittenhouse by Charles Willson Peale

Pemberton then asked William Waring, a Philadelphia mathematician and ephemeris calculator, and David Rittenhouse, a prominent American astronomer, almanac author, surveyor and scientific instrument maker who was at the time serving as the president of the American Philosophical Society, to confirm the accuracy of Banneker's work. Waring endorsed Banneker's work, stating, "I have examined Benjamin Banneker's Almanac for 1792, and am of the Opinion that it well deserves the Acceptance and Encouragement of the Public."

Rittenhouse responded to Pemberton by stating that Banneker's ephemeris "was a very extraordinary performance, considering the Colour of the Author" and that he "had no doubt that the Calculations are sufficiently accurate for the purposes of a common Almanac. .... Every instance of Genius amongst the Negroes is worthy of attention, because their suppressors seem to lay great stress on their supposed inferior mental abilities." A biographer wrote that Banneker replied to Rittenhouse's endorsement by stating: "I am annoyed to find that the subject of my race is so much stressed. The work is either correct or it is not. In this case, I believe it to be perfect."

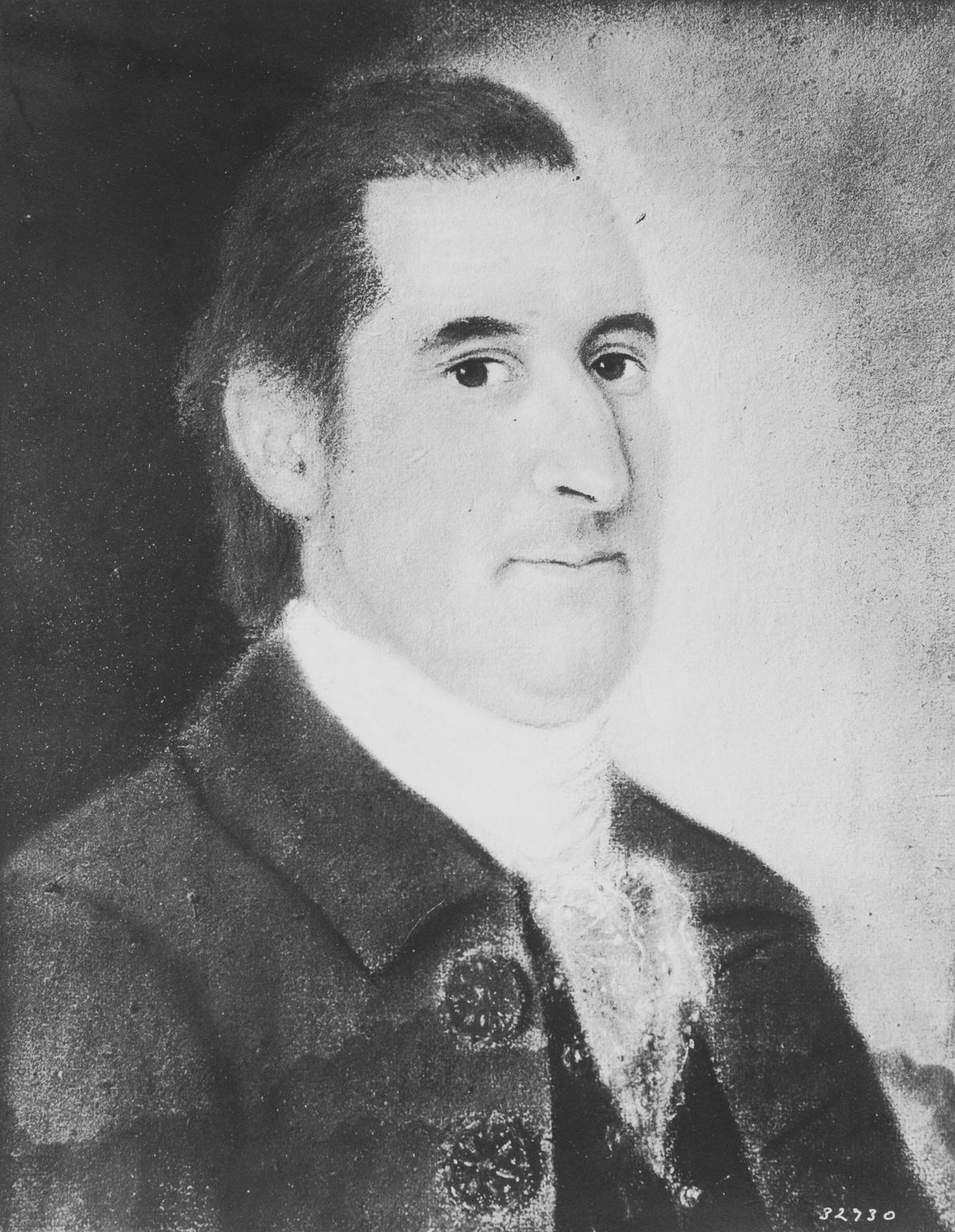
^{ Rhode Island Historical Society, Providence } Portrait of William Goddard (c. 1780–1785)

Pemberton then made arrangements for Joseph Crukshank (a Philadelphia Quaker who was a founder of the Pennsylvania Society for the Abolition of Slavery and who had since 1770 been publishing almanacs, including at least one that Waring had calculated) to print Banneker's almanac. Having thus secured the support of Pemberton, Rittenhouse and Waring, Banneker delivered a manuscript containing his ephemeris to William Goddard, a Baltimore printer who had published The Pennsylvania, Delaware, Maryland and Virginia Almanack and Ephemeris for every year since 1782. Goddard then agreed to print and distribute Banneker's work within an almanac and ephemeris for the year of 1792.

Banneker's Pennsylvania, Delaware, Maryland and Virginia Almanack and Ephemeris, for the Year of our Lord, 1792 was the first in a six-year series of almanacs and ephemerides that printers agreed to publish and sell. At least 28 editions of the almanacs, some of which appeared during the same year, were printed in seven cities in five states: Baltimore; Philadelphia; Wilmington, Delaware; Alexandria, Virginia; Petersburg, Virginia; Richmond, Virginia; and Trenton, New Jersey.

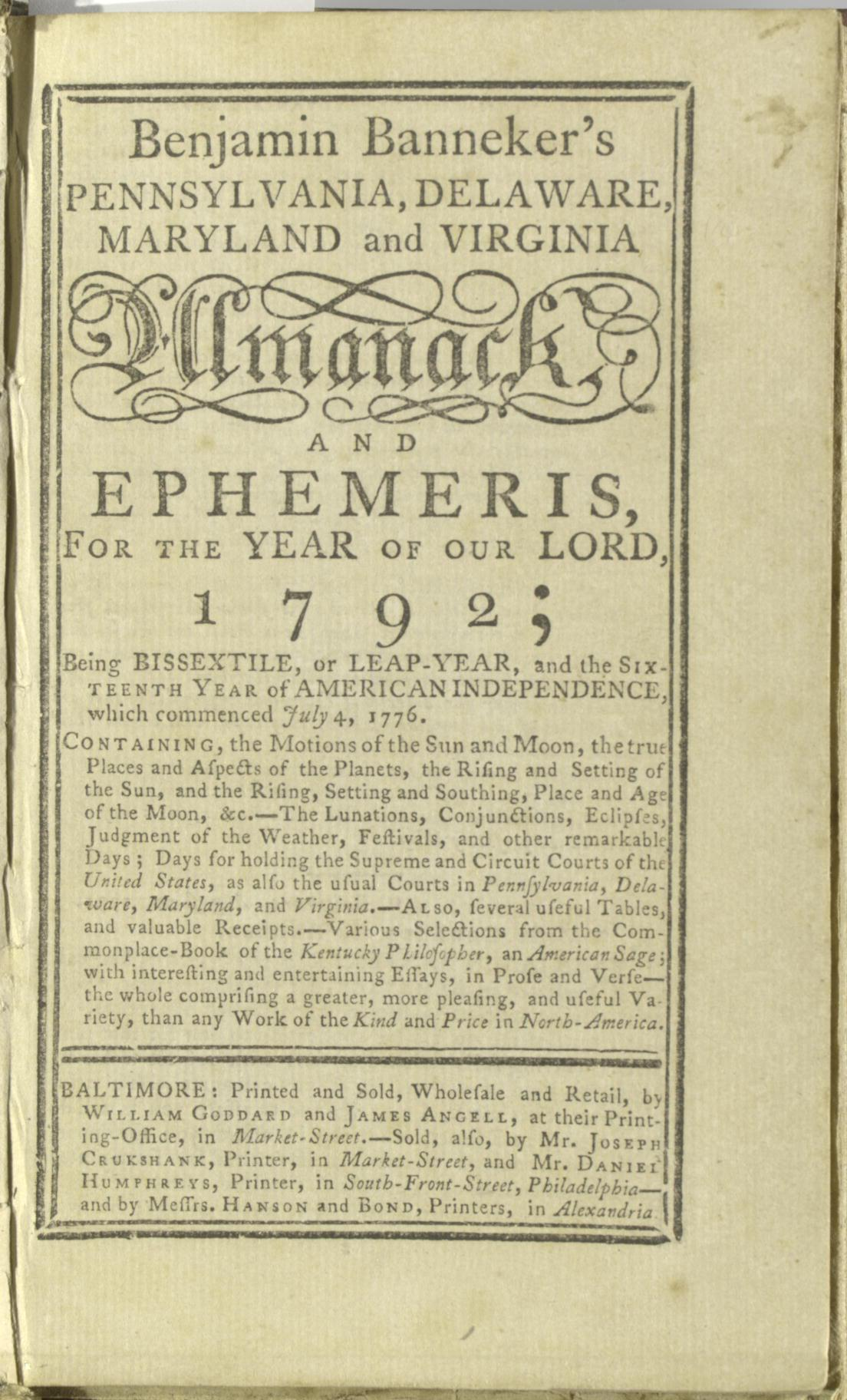
Title page of the Baltimore edition of Banneker's 1792 almanac and ephemeris.

The title pages of the Baltimore editions of Banneker's 1792, 1793 and 1794 almanacs and ephemerides stated that the publications contained:

the Motions of the Sun and Moon, the True Places and Aspects of the Planets, the Rising and Setting of the Sun, Place and Age of the Moon, &c. – The Lunations, Conjunctions, Eclipses, Judgment of the Weather, Festivals, and other remarkable Days; Days for holding the Supreme and Circuit Courts of the United States, as also the useful Courts in Pennsylvania, Delaware, Maryland, and Virginia. Also – several useful Tables, and valuable Receipts. – Various Selections from the Commonplace–Book of the Kentucky Philosopher, an American Sage; with interesting and entertaining Essays, in Prose and Verse –the whole comprising a greater, more pleasing, and useful Variety than any Work of the Kind and Price in North America.

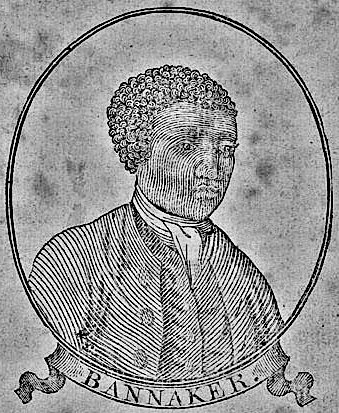
Woodcut portrait of Benjamin Bannaker (Banneker) in title page of a Baltimore edition of his 1795 Pennsylvania, Delaware, Maryland, and Virginia Almanac.

In addition to the information that its title page described, the 1792 almanac contained a tide table listing the methods for calculating the time of high water at four locations along the Chesapeake Bay (Cape Charles and Point Lookout, Virginia; Annapolis and Baltimore, Maryland). Later almanacs contained tables for making such calculations for those locations as well as for Boston, New York, Philadelphia, Halifax, Quebec, Hatteras, Nantucket and other places. Monthly tables in each edition listed astronomical data and weather predictions for each of the months' dates.

A Philadelphia edition of Banneker's 1795 almanac contained a lengthy account of a yellow fever epidemic that had struck that city in 1793. Written by a committee whose president was the city's mayor, Matthew Clarkson, the account related the presumed origins and causes of the epidemic, as well as the extent and duration of the event.

The title pages of two Baltimore editions of Banneker's 1795 almanac had woodcut portraits of him as he may have appeared. However, a biographer later concluded that the portraits were more likely portrayals of an idealized African-American youth.

A Baltimore edition of Banneker's 1796 almanac contained a table enumerating the population of each U.S. state and the Southwest Territory as recorded in the 1790 United States census. The table listed the number of free persons and slaves in each state and the territory according to race and gender, as well as to whether they were above or below the age of 16 years. The table also listed the number of members of the U.S. House of Representatives that each state had during the almanac's year.

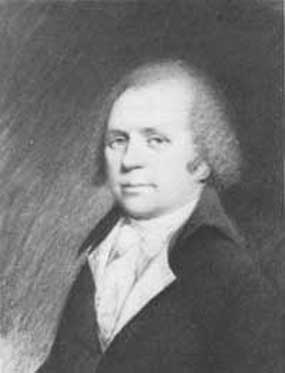
^{ Independence National Historical Park, Philadelphia } Portrait of James McHenry (ca. 1795–1800)

The almanacs' editors prefaced the publications with adulatory references to Banneker and his race. Editions of Banneker's 1792 and 1793 almanacs contained full or abridged copies of a lengthy commendatory letter that James McHenry, the Secretary of the 1787 United States Constitutional Convention and self-described friend of Banneker, had written to Goddard and his partner, James Angell, in August 1791 to support the almanac's publication.

As first published in Banneker's 1792 almanac and later given an increased circulation when re-published in Philadelphia within The American Museum, or Universal Magazine, McHenry's full letter began:

Benjamin Banneker, a free Negro, has calculated an Almanack, for the ensuing year, 1792, which being desirous to dispose of, to the best advantage, he has requested me to aid his application to you for that purpose. Having fully satisfied myself, in respect to his title to this type of authorship, if you can agree to him for the price of his work, I may venture to assure you it will do you credit, as Editors, while it will afford you the opportunity to encourage talents that have thus far surmounted the most discouraging circumstances and prejudices."

In their preface to Banneker's 1792 almanac, the editors of the work wrote that they:

feel themselves gratified in the Opportunity of presenting to the Public, through the Medium of their Press, what must be considered as an extraordinary Effort of Genius — a complete and accurate EPHEMERIS for the Year 1792, calculated by a sable Descendant of Africa, .... — They flatter themselves that a philanthropic Public, in this enlightened Era, will be induced to give their Patronage and Support to this Work, not only on Account of its intrinsic Merit, (it having met the Approbation of several of the most distinguished Astronomers in America, particularly the celebrated Mr. Rittenhouse) but from similar Motives to those which induced the Editors to give this Calculation the Preference, the ardent desire of drawing modest Merit from Obscurity, and controverting the long-established illiberal Prejudice against the Blacks.

After Goddard and Angell had published their 1792 Baltimore edition of the almanac, Angell wrote in the 1793 edition (which he alone edited) that abolitionists William Pitt, Charles James Fox and William Wilberforce had introduced the 1792 edition into the British House of Commons to aid their effort to end the British slave trade in Africa. However, the British Parliament's report of the debate that accompanied this effort did not mention either Banneker or his almanac.

Supported by Andrew, George and Elias Ellicott and heavily promoted by the Maryland and Pennsylvania abolition societies, the early editions of the almanacs achieved commercial success. Printers then distributed at least nine editions of Banneker's 1795 almanac. A Wilmington, Delaware, printer issued five editions for distribution by different vendors. Printers in Baltimore issued three versions of the almanac, while three Philadelphia printers also sold editions. A Trenton, New Jersey, printer additionally sold a version of the work.

==== Banneker's journals ====
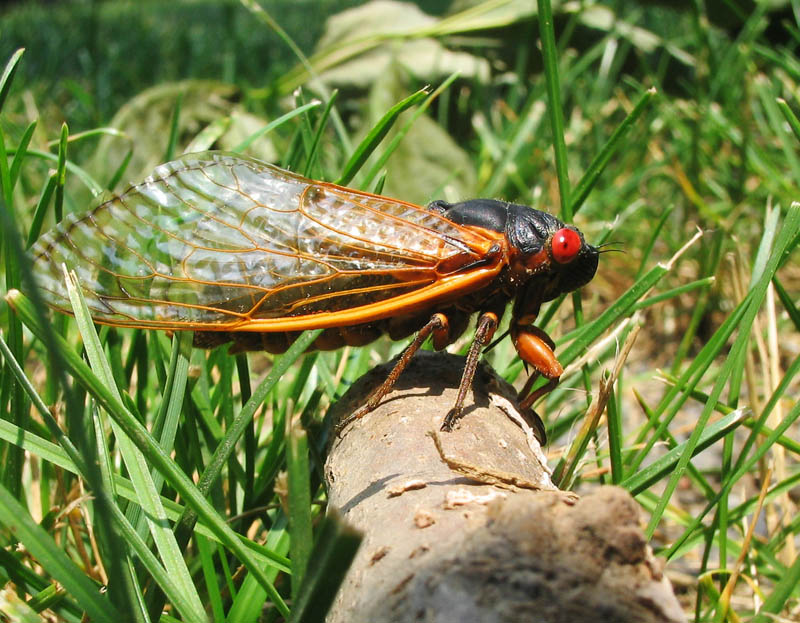
Brood X periodical cicada

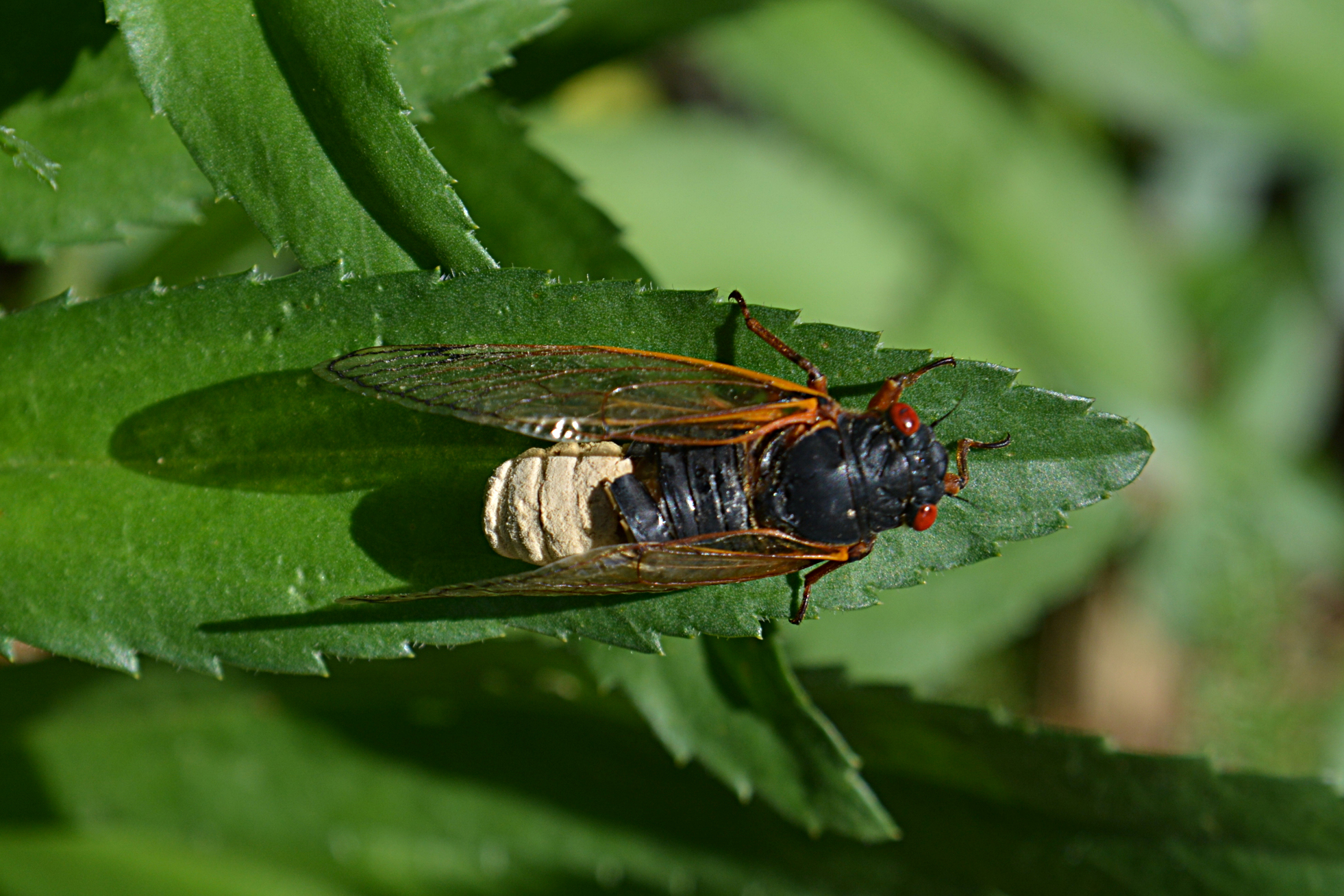
Brood X periodical cicada with Massospora cicadina infection

Banneker kept a series of journals that contained his notebooks for astronomical observations, his diary and accounts of his dreams. The journals additionally contained a number of mathematical calculations and puzzles.

On the day of his funeral, a fire destroyed all but one of Banneker's journals.

The surviving journal described in April 1800 Banneker's recollections of the 1749, 1766 and 1783 emergences of Brood X of the seventeen-year periodical cicada (Magicicada septendecim and related species) and described an effect that the pathogenic fungus, Massospora cicadina, has on its host. The journal also recorded Banneker's observations on the hives and behavior of honey bees.

=== Political views ===
Banneker's 1792 almanac contained an extract from an anonymous essay entitled "On Negro Slavery, and the Slave Trade" that the Columbian Magazine had published in 1790. After quoting a statement that David Rittenhouse had made (that Negroes "have been doomed to endless slavery by us — merely because their bodies have been disposed to reflect or absorb the rays of light in a way different from ours"), the extract concluded:

The time, it is hoped is not very remote, when those ill-fated people, dwelling in this land of freedom, shall commence a participation with the white inhabitants, in the blessings of liberty; and experience the kindly protection of government, for the essential rights of human nature.

A Philadelphia edition of Banneker's 1793 almanac that Joseph Crukshank published contained copies of pleas for peace that the English anti-slavery poet William Cowper and others had authored, as well as anti-slavery speeches and writings from England and America. The latter included extracts from speeches that William Pitt, Matthew Montagu and Charles James Fox had given to the British House of Commons in 1792 during the debate on a motion for the abolition of the British slave trade, an extract from a 1789 poem by an English Quaker, Thomas Wilkinson, and an extract from a query in Thomas Jefferson's 1787 Notes on the State of Virginia.

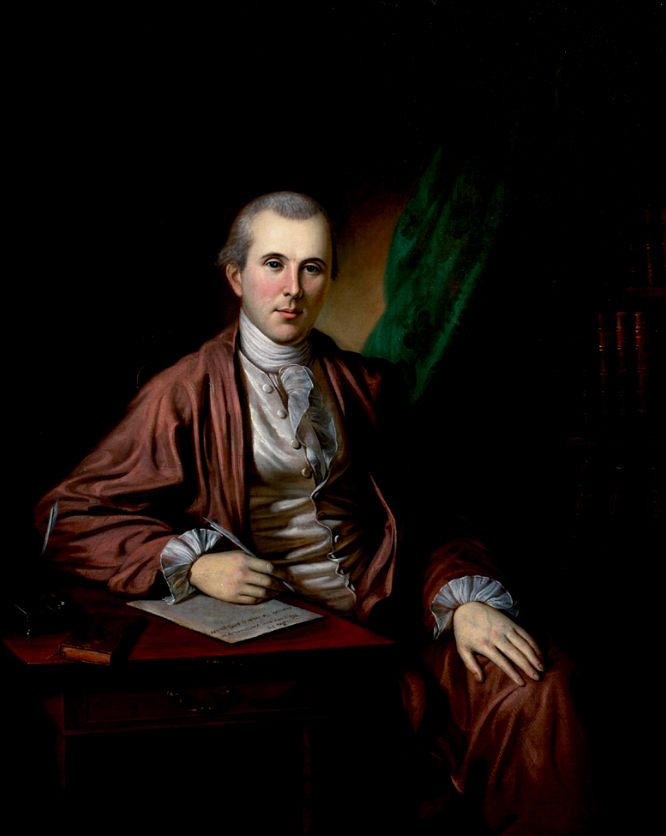
^{ Winterthur Museum, Winterthur, Delaware }1783 oil portrait of Dr. Benjamin Rush by Charles Willson Peale

Crukshank's edition of Banneker's 1793 almanac also contained a copy of "A Plan of a Peace-Office, for the United States". Although the almanac did not identify the Plan's author, writers later attributed the work to Dr. Benjamin Rush, a signer of the 1776 Declaration of Independence.

The Plan proposed the appointment of a "Secretary of Peace", described the Secretary's powers and advocated federal support and promotion of the Christian religion.

==== Correspondence with Thomas Jefferson ====
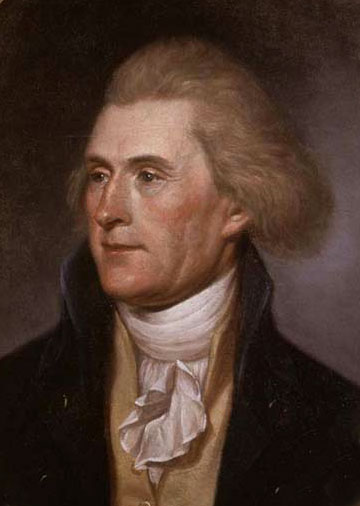
^{ Independence National Historical Park, Philadelphia }1791 oil portrait of Thomas Jefferson by Charles Willson Peale

On August 19, 1791, after departing the federal capital area, Banneker wrote a letter to Thomas Jefferson, who in 1776 had drafted the United States Declaration of Independence and in 1791 was serving as United States Secretary of State. Quoting language in the Declaration, the letter expressed a plea for justice for African Americans.

To support his plea, Banneker included within his letter a handwritten manuscript of an almanac for 1792 containing his ephemeris with his astronomical calculations. He retained handwritten copies of the letter and Jefferson's August 30, 1791, reply in a volume of manuscripts that became part of a journal.

In late 1792, James Angell published a Baltimore edition of Banneker's 1793 almanac that contained copies of Banneker's letter and Jefferson's reply. Soon afterwards, a Philadelphia printer distributed two sequential editions of a widely circulated pamphlet that also contained the letter and reply.

The Universal Asylum, and Columbian Magazine also published Banneker's letter and Jefferson's reply in Philadelphia in late 1792. The Magazine's editors (A Society of Gentlemen) titled the letter as being "from the famous self-taught astronomer, Benjamin Banneker, a black man".

In his letter, Banneker accused Jefferson of criminally using fraud and violence to oppress his slaves.

Jefferson's reply did not directly respond to Banneker's accusations, but instead expressed his support for the advancement of his "black brethren". His reply, which writers have characterized as "courteous", but "ambiguous" and "noncommittal", stated:

Philadelphia Aug. 30. 1791.
Sir,
I thank you sincerely for your letter of the 19th. instant and for the Almanac it contained. no body wishes more than I do to see such proofs as you exhibit, that nature has given to our black brethren, talents equal to those of the other colours of men, & that the appearance of a want of them is owing merely to the degraded condition of their existence both in Africa & America. I can add with truth that no body wishes more ardently to see a good system commenced for raising the condition both of their body & mind to what it ought to be, as fast as the imbecillity of their present existence, and other circumstance which cannot be neglected, will admit. I have taken the liberty of sending your almanac to Monsieur de Condorcet, Secretary of the Academy of sciences at Paris, and member of the Philanthropic society because I considered it as a document to which your whole colour had a right for their justification against the doubts which have been entertained of them. I am with great esteem, Sir,
Your most obedt. humble servt.
Th: Jefferson

Marie-Jean-Antoine-Nicolas de Caritat, Marquis de Condorcet, to whom Jefferson sent Banneker's almanac, was a noted French mathematician and abolitionist who was a member of the French Société des Amis des Noirs (Society of the Friends of the Blacks). It appears that the Academy of Sciences itself did not receive the almanac.

When writing his letter, Banneker informed Jefferson that his 1791 work with Andrew Ellicott on the District boundary survey had affected his work on his 1792 ephemeris and almanac.

On the same day that he replied to Banneker (August 30, 1791), Jefferson sent a letter to the Marquis de Condorcet that contained the following paragraph relating to Banneker's race, abilities, almanac and work with Andrew Ellicott:

I am happy to be able to inform you that we have now in the United States a negro, the son of a black man born in Africa, and of a black woman born in the United States, who is a very respectable mathematician. I procured him to be employed under one of our chief directors in laying out the new federal city on the Patowmac, & in the intervals of his leisure, while on that work, he made an Almanac for the next year, which he sent me in his own hand writing, & which I inclose to you. I have seen very elegant solutions of Geometrical problems by him. Add to this that he is a very worthy & respectable member of society. He is a free man. I shall be delighted to see these instances of moral eminence so multiplied as to prove that the want of talents observed in them is merely the effect of their degraded condition, and not proceeding from any difference in the structure of the parts on which intellect depends.

In 1809, three years after Banneker's death, Jefferson expressed a different opinion of Banneker in a letter to Joel Barlow that criticized a "diatribe" that a French abolitionist, Henri Grégoire, had written in 1808, stating:

"...we know ourselves of Banneker. We know he had spherical trigonometry enough to make almanacs, but not without the suspicion of aid from Ellicot, who was his neighbor & friend, & never missed an opportunity of puffing him. I have a long letter from Banneker which shews [sic] him to have had a mind of very common stature indeed".

=== Death ===
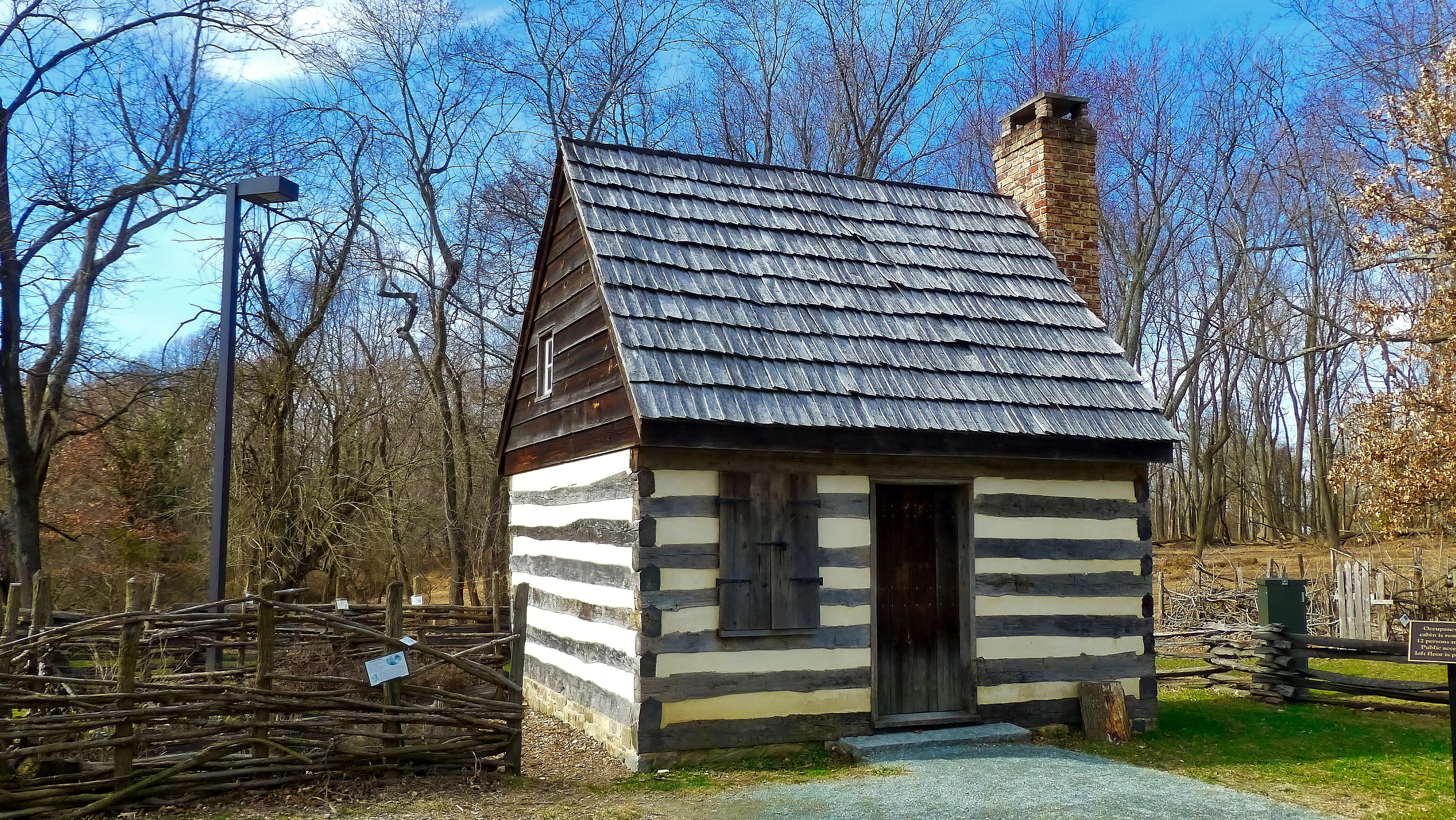
Replica of Banneker's log cabin in Benjamin Banneker Historical Park, Oella, Maryland (2017)

For reasons that are unclear, the four editions of his 1797 almanac were the last ones that printers published. After selling much of his homesite to the Ellicotts and others, he probably died in his log cabin nine years later on October 19, 1806, aged 74. (Some sources state that Banneker died on Sunday, October 9, 1806, which was actually a Thursday.) His chronic alcoholism, which worsened as he aged, may have contributed to his death.

Banneker never married. An obituary concluded "Mr. Banneker is a prominent instance to prove that a descendant of Africa is susceptible of as great mental improvement and deep knowledge into the mysteries of nature as that of any other nation".

A commemorative obelisk that the Maryland Bicentennial Commission and the State Commission on Afro American History and Culture erected in 1977 near his unmarked grave stands in the yard of the Mount Gilboa African Methodist Episcopal Church in Oella, Maryland (see Mount Gilboa Chapel).

== Artifacts ==
On the day of his funeral in 1806, a fire burned Banneker's log cabin to the ground, destroying many of his belongings and papers.

- In 1813, William Goodard, who had published the Baltimore edition of Banneker's 1792 almanac (Banneker's first published almanac), donated the manuscript for the almanac to the American Antiquarian Society in Worcester, Massachusetts.
- The Massachusetts Historical Society in Boston holds in its collections the August 17, 1791, handwritten letter that Banneker sent to Thomas Jefferson. Jefferson endorsed the letter as received on August 21, 1791.
- The Library of Congress holds a copy of Jefferson's August 30, 1791, handwritten reply to Banneker. Jefferson produced this document on a letter copying press made by James Watt & Co. that he used before he sent his reply to Banneker. He retained the copy in his files.
- The Library of Congress also holds a copy of Jefferson's August 30, 1791, handwritten letter to the Marquis de Condorcet that described Banneker's race, abilities, almanac and work with Andrew Ellicott. Jefferson produced this document on his copying press before sending the handwritten letter to the Marquis.
- The Library of Congress holds a handwritten duplicate of Jefferson's letter to the Marquis de Condorcet. The pagination in the duplicate differs from that in the copy that Jefferson produced on his copying press. The Library attributes the duplicate to Jefferson.
- The Princeton University Library holds within its Straus Autograph Collection the recipient's copy of the handwritten letter that Jefferson sent to Joel Barlow in 1809. Jefferson's letter cited the letter that Banneker had sent to him in 1791. Barlow endorsed Jefferson's letter after he received it.
- The Library of Congress holds a copy of Jefferson's 1809 letter to Joel Barlow that Jefferson had retained in his files after sending his handwritten letter to Barlow. Jefferson used a polygraph device that enabled him to make the copy at the same time that he was writing the original. An Englishman, John Isaac Hawkins, and an American, Charles Willson Peale, had earlier developed this device with the help of Jefferson's suggestions.

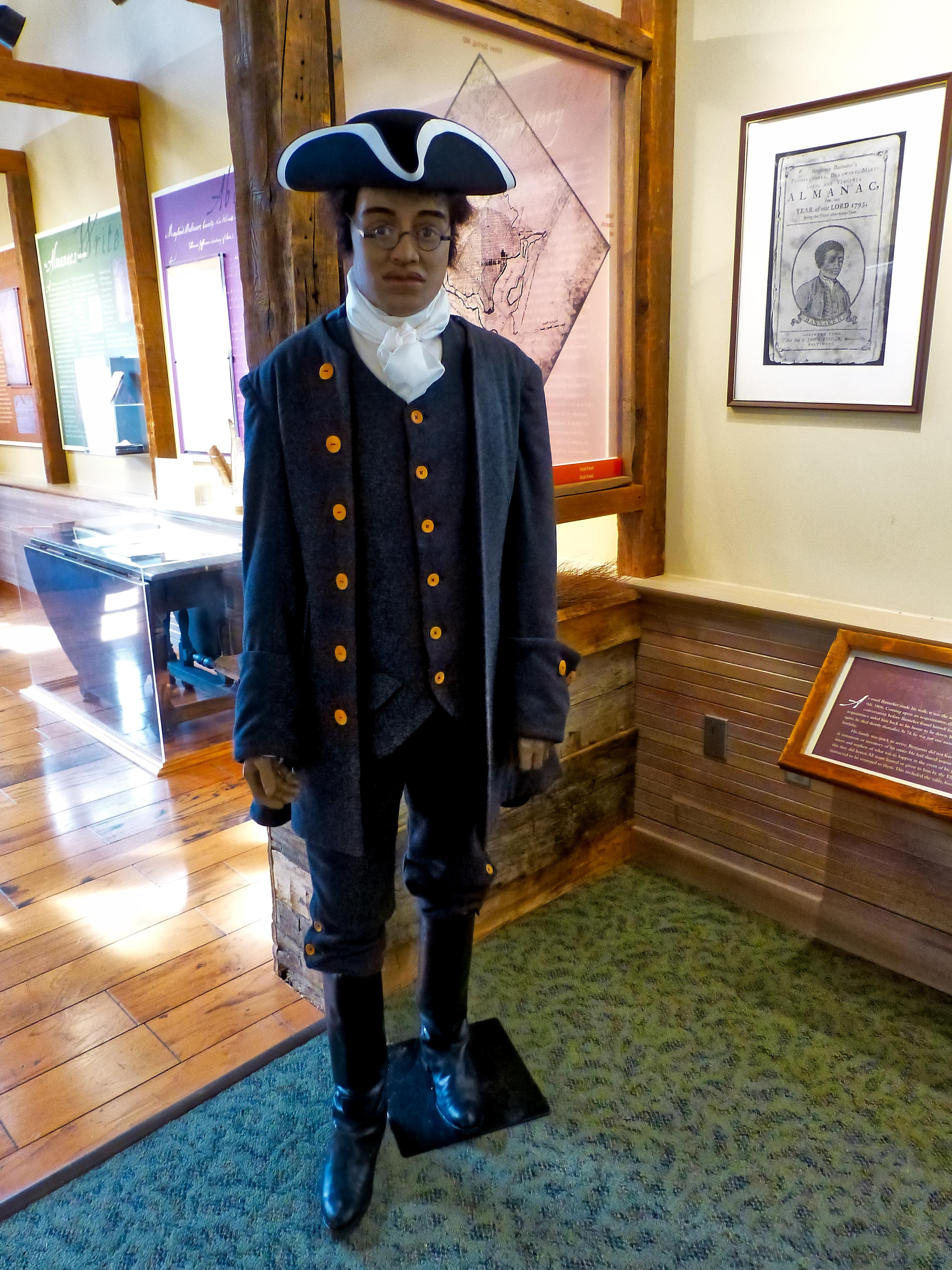
Interior of Benjamin Banneker Museum in Oella, Maryland. A drop-leaf table that Banneker used is in the background. (2017)

- In 1987, a member of the Ellicott family, which had retained Banneker's only remaining journal, donated that document and other Banneker manuscripts to the Maryland Historical Society in Baltimore. The family also retained several items that Banneker had used after borrowing them from George Ellicott, as well as some that Banneker himself had owned.
- In 1996, a descendant of George Ellicott decided to sell at auction some of those items, including a drop-leaf table, candlesticks, candle molds, maps, letters and diaries. Although supporters of the planned Benjamin Banneker Historical Park and Museum in Oella, Maryland, had hoped to obtain these and several other items related to Banneker and the Ellicotts, a Virginia investment banker won most of the items with a series of bids that totaled $85,000. The purchaser stated that he expected to keep some of the items and to donate the rest to the planned African American Civil War Memorial museum in Washington, D.C.
- In 1997, it was announced that the artifacts would initially be exhibited in the Corcoran Gallery of Art in Washington, D.C., and then loaned to the Banneker-Douglass Museum in Annapolis, Maryland. After completion of the Benjamin Banneker Historical Park and Museum in Oella, the artifacts would be loaned to that facility for a period of twenty years. The Oella museum displayed the table, candle molds and candlesticks after it opened in 1998.

== Mythology and commemorations ==
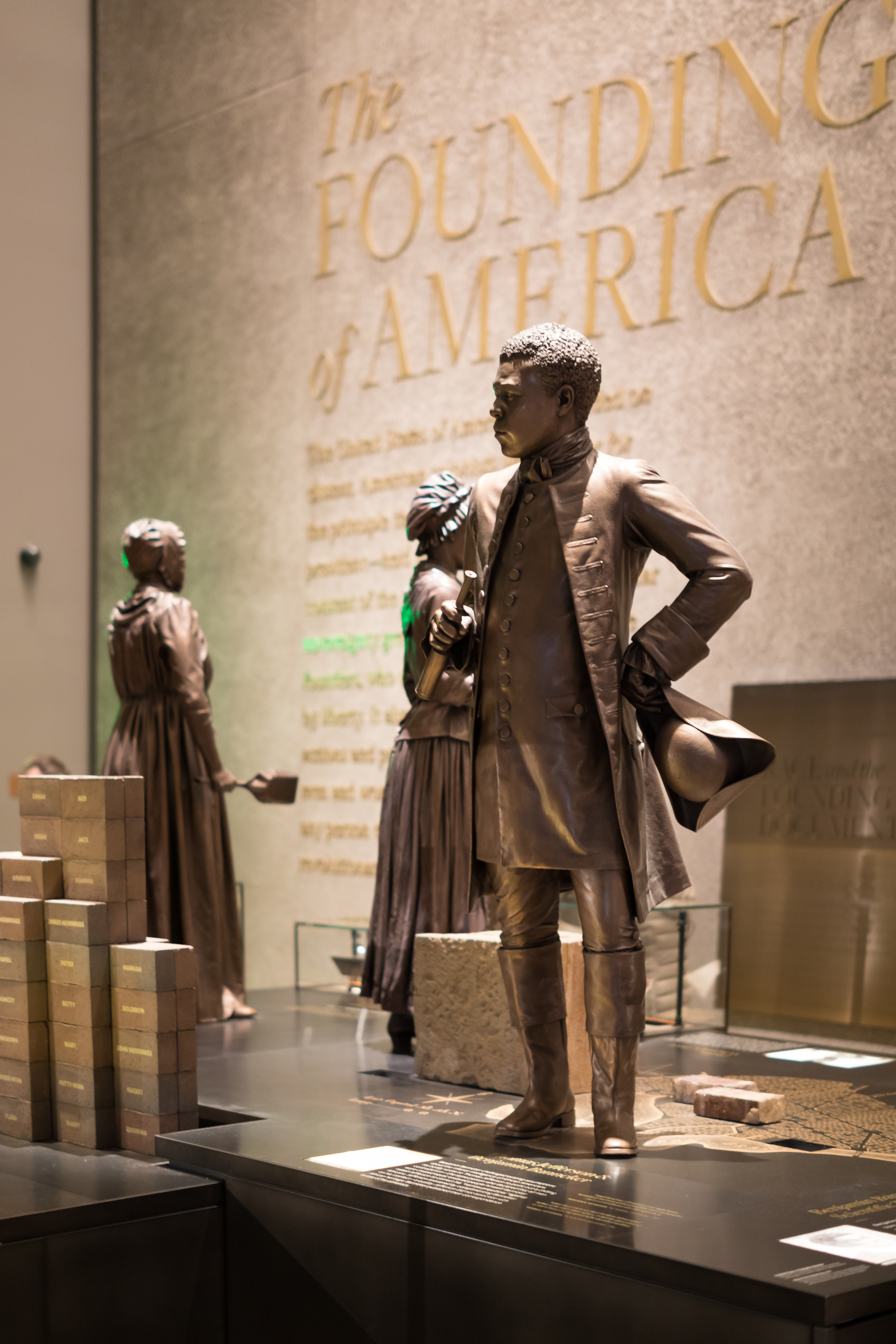
Statue of Benjamin Banneker in the Smithsonian Institution's National Museum of African American History and Culture in Washington, D.C. (2020)

A substantial mythology exaggerating Banneker's accomplishments has developed during the two centuries that have elapsed since his death, becoming a part of African-American culture. Several such urban legends describe Banneker's alleged activities in the Washington, D.C., area around the time that he assisted Andrew Ellicott in the federal district boundary survey. Others involve his clock, his astronomical works, his almanacs and his journals.

A United States postage stamp and the names of a number of recreational and cultural facilities, schools, streets, and other facilities and institutions throughout the United States have commemorated Banneker's documented and mythical accomplishments throughout the years since he lived. In 1983, Rita Dove, a future Poet Laureate of the United States, wrote a biographical poem about Banneker while on the faculty of Arizona State University.

== Electronic copies of Banneker's publications ==
- Banneker, Benjamin (1791). "Benjamin Banneker's Pennsylvania, Delaware, Maryland and Virginia Almanack and EPHEMERIS, for the YEAR of our LORD, 1792; Being BISSEXTILE, or LEAP-YEAR, and the Sixteenth Year of AMERICAN INDEPENDENCE, which commenced July 4, 1776" (48 digitized images). Baltimore: Printed and sold, Wholesale and Retail, by William Goddard and James Angell, at their printing-office, in Market-Street. – Sold, also, by Mr. Joseph Crukshank, Printer, in Market-Street, and Mr. Daniel Humphreys, Printer, in South-Front-Street, Philadelphia – and by Messrs. Hanson and Bond, Printers, in Alexandria. LCCN 98650590. OCLC 39311640. Archived from the original on April 21, 2020 – via Library of Congress.
- Banneker, Benjamin (1792a). Banneker's Almanack and Ephemeris for the Year of Our Lord 1793; being The First After Bissextile or Leap Year. Philadelphia: Printed and Sold by Joseph Crukshank, No. 87, High-Street.

(1) In Whiteman, Maxwell (ed.). Banneker's Almanack and Ephemeris for the Year of Our Lord 1793; being The First After Bissextile or Leap Year and Banneker's Almanac, For the Year 1795, Being the Third After Leap Year: Afro-American History Series: Rhistoric Publication No. 202 (47 digitized images). Rhistoric publications (1969 Reprint ed.). Rhistoric Publications, a division of Microsurance Inc. LCCN 72077039. OCLC 907004619 – via HathiTrust Digital Library.
(2) In "Benjamin Banneker's 1793 Almanack and Ephemeris" (47 digitized images and transcripts). Washington, D.C.: Smithsonian Institution: Smithsonian Digital Volunteers: Transcription Center. Archived from the original on April 15, 2020.

- Banneker, Benjamin (1792b). Copy of a letter from Benjamin Banneker to the secretary of state, with his answer (1 digitized image). Philadelphia: Printed and sold by Daniel Lawrence, No. 33. North Fourth-Street, Near Race. LCCN 17022848. OCLC 614046208 – via Library of Congress.

(1) Pages 3–10: Banneker, Benjamin (August 19, 1791). Copy of a letter from Benjamin Banneker, &c (8 digitized images). Baltimore County, Maryland.
(2) Pages 11–12: Jefferson, Thomas (August 30, 1791). To Mr. Benjamin Banneker (2 digitized images). Philadelphia.

- A Society of Gentlemen, ed. (October 1792). "(1) Letter from the famous self-taught astronomer, Benjamin Banneker, a black man, to Thomas Jefferson, Esq., Secretary of State (2) Mr. Jefferson's answer to the preceding letter: To Mr. Benjamin Banneker" (1 digitized image). The Universal Asylum, and Columbian Magazine. 6. Philadelphia: Printed for the Proprietors, by William Young, Bookseller, Philadelphia: 222–224. LCCN sn98034230. OCLC 50655818 – via Internet Archive.
- Banneker, Benjamin (1794). Banneker's Almanac, for the Year 1795: Being the Third After Leap Year: Containing, (besides every thing necessary in an almanac,) an Account of the Yellow Fever, lately prevalent in Philadelphia, with the Number of those who died, from the First of August till the Ninth of November, 1793 (35 digitized images). Rhistoric publications. Philadelphia: Printed for William Young, Bookseller, no. 52, the Corner of Chesnut and Second—streets. OCLC 62824552. In Whiteman, Maxwell (ed.). Banneker's Almanack and Ephemeris for BISSEXTILE or Leap Year and Bannekeer's Almanac, For the Year 1795, Being the Third After Leap Year: Afro-American History Series: Rhistoric Publication No. 202 (1 digitized image). Rhistoric publications (1969 Reprint ed.). Rhistoric Publications, a division of Microsurance Inc. LCCN 72077039. OCLC 907004619 – via HathiTrust Digital Library.
- Banneker, Benjamin (1795). Bannaker's Maryland, Pennsylvania, Delaware, Virginia, Kentucky, and North Carolina Almanack and EPHEMERIS, for the YEAR of our LORD 1796; Being BISSEXTILE, or LEAP YEAR; The Twentieth Year of AMERICAN INDEPENDENCE, And Eighth Year of the FEDERAL GOVERNMENT (35 digitized images). Baltimore: Printed for Philip Edwards, James Keddie, and Thomas, Andrews and Butler; and Sold at their respective Stores, Wholesale and Retail. OCLC 62824546 – via HathiTrust Digital Library.

== See also ==
- List of African-American inventors and scientists
