= Ellicott Dredges =

- Formerly: Ellicott Machine Company
- Founded: 1885; 140 years ago
- Founders: John Ellicott; Andrew Ellicott

First established as the Ellicott Machine Company in 1885, Ellicott Dredges is one of the oldest manufacturers in the world that specializes in the design and building of dredges and dredge machinery. Throughout its 125 years of existence, Ellicott has built over 1,500 dredges and exported to over 80 countries.

== History ==
By 1783, brothers John and Andrew Ellicott were well established flour exporters and operators of the largest flour mill on the East coast US – Ellicott Mills. To accommodate their export business, the Ellicott brothers built a warehouse and wharf at Pratt and Light Streets on the Baltimore harbor. To maintain the wharf's water depth, and continue to bring in ships, the Ellicotts commonly utilized horse drawn scoops to remove sediment from the harbor. In 1785, the Ellicotts designed and built their first dredge, the Mud Machine. Their efforts have been documented as the first dredging effort in the Baltimore harbor. In the same year, Maryland's assembly established a board of port wardens to oversee the management of the Baltimore port and its dredging needs. In 1790, the wardens approved the first use of mud machines throughout the harbor.

In 1827, the federal government recognizing the importance of the Port of Baltimore and its location on the B&O railroad, approved funding for an ongoing Baltimore harbor dredging program. To initiate the program, the Maryland state senate purchased ten Mud Machines from the Ellicott brothers. Shortly thereafter, horses were replaced by steam engines on the Mud Machine crafting the first power driven dredge in the US.

Ellicott Dredges built the cutter dredges used in construction of the Panama Canal. The first machine delivered was a steam-driven, 900 HP, 20-inch dredge. In 1941, Ellicott Dredges also built the dredge MINDI, a 10,000 HP, 28-inch cutter suction dredge still operating in the Panama Canal.

Currently, Ellicott has sold over 1,500 dredges to 80 different countries. Their cutter dredges can be used for a variety of applications including coastal protection, sand mining, and land reclamation.
