= George Ellicott =

Founder of Ellicott's Mills, MD, US (1760–1832)

Ellicott, George
- Born: George Ellicott; March 28, 1760; Ellicott City, Maryland
- Died: April 9, 1832 (aged 72); Ellicott City, Maryland
- Spouse: Elizabeth Brooke (1762–1853)
- Children: Martha Ellicott Tyson, Elizabeth Ellicott Lea
- Parent: Andrew Ellicott (miller)

George Ellicott (1760–1832) was a mathematician and an amateur astronomer.

His father was Andrew Ellicott, who with his two brothers founded Ellicott's Mills (now Ellicott City), Maryland. George Ellicott was a younger cousin of surveyor Major Andrew Ellicott and a friend of Benjamin Banneker. He was the father of Martha Ellicott Tyson (September 13, 1795 – March 5, 1873), who became an Elder of the Quaker Meeting in Baltimore, an anti-slavery and women's rights advocate, the author of a biography of Benjamin Banneker, a founder of Swarthmore College and an inductee to the Maryland Women's Hall of Fame.

After the colonial war, George Ellicott purchased swampland now known as the Inner Harbor of Baltimore where he used a horse drawn dredge to create shipping docks for his flour supplies.

The stone home he built in 1789 and lived in for forty years stands by the Patapsco River in Oella, Maryland. It was moved from its original location to higher ground across the street in 1983.

In 1799 George traveled to the plains of Sandusky, where the Crawford expedition had met with defeat seventeen years prior. Merchants would conduct a yearly meeting, reporting back to Congress.

In 1801, George Ellicott and his brother Elias visited Washington, D.C. with a Native American contingent where he spoke with the Secretary of War and President John Adams where a pledge was made to try to stop the distribution of liquor to Native Americans.

In 1806, Chief Little Turtle of the Miami people, Chief of the Rusheville people, Beaver Crow of the Delawares, Chiefs of the Shawanese, and the chief Raven of the Potowatomies visited his home while returning from a visit to Washington, D.C.
