= George Ellicott House =

- Location within Maryland
- 39°16′2″N 76°47′34″W
- Nearest city: Oella, Maryland

History
- Built: 18th century

Site notes
- Architectural style: Federal

George Ellicott House is a historic house located in Oella in Baltimore County, Maryland, United States.

George Ellicott was a son of Andrew Ellicott, one of several brothers that founded Ellicott Mills (Ellicott City). George Ellicott bought swampland after the colonial war now known as the Inner Harbor of Baltimore. He used a horse drawn dredge to create shipping docks for his flour supplies.

The George Ellicott House was built in Oella on the eastern shore of the Patapsco River opposite Ellicott City. The granite house was built in 1789. It resided on the grounds of the Wilkens-Rodgers flour mill. In 1972 the house was flooded by Hurricane Agnes and his brother Jonathan's neighboring house was destroyed.

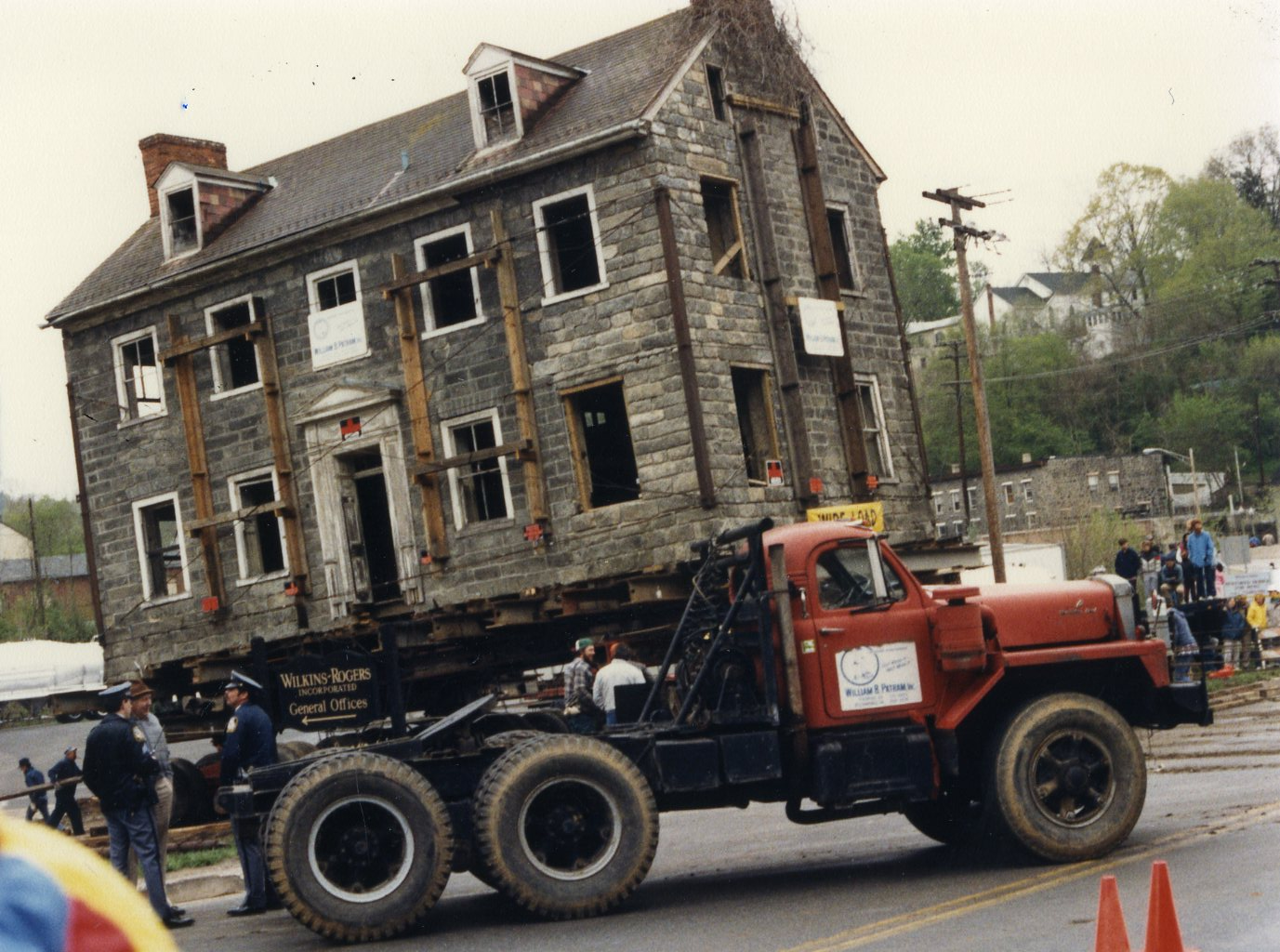
The house being moved in 1987

In 1983 the Maryland General assembly contributed $135,000 toward the $1 million expense of moving the house to higher ground on the other side of the street it resided on. The move was facilitated by a partnership between Historic Ellicott City Inc., James A. Clark, Jr., Judge John L Clark, and the Oella Company.

== See also ==
- Andrew Ellicott (miller)
