= Andrew Ellicott House =

Historic house in Pennsylvania, United States

- Sehner-Ellicott-Von Hess House
- U.S. National Register of Historic Places
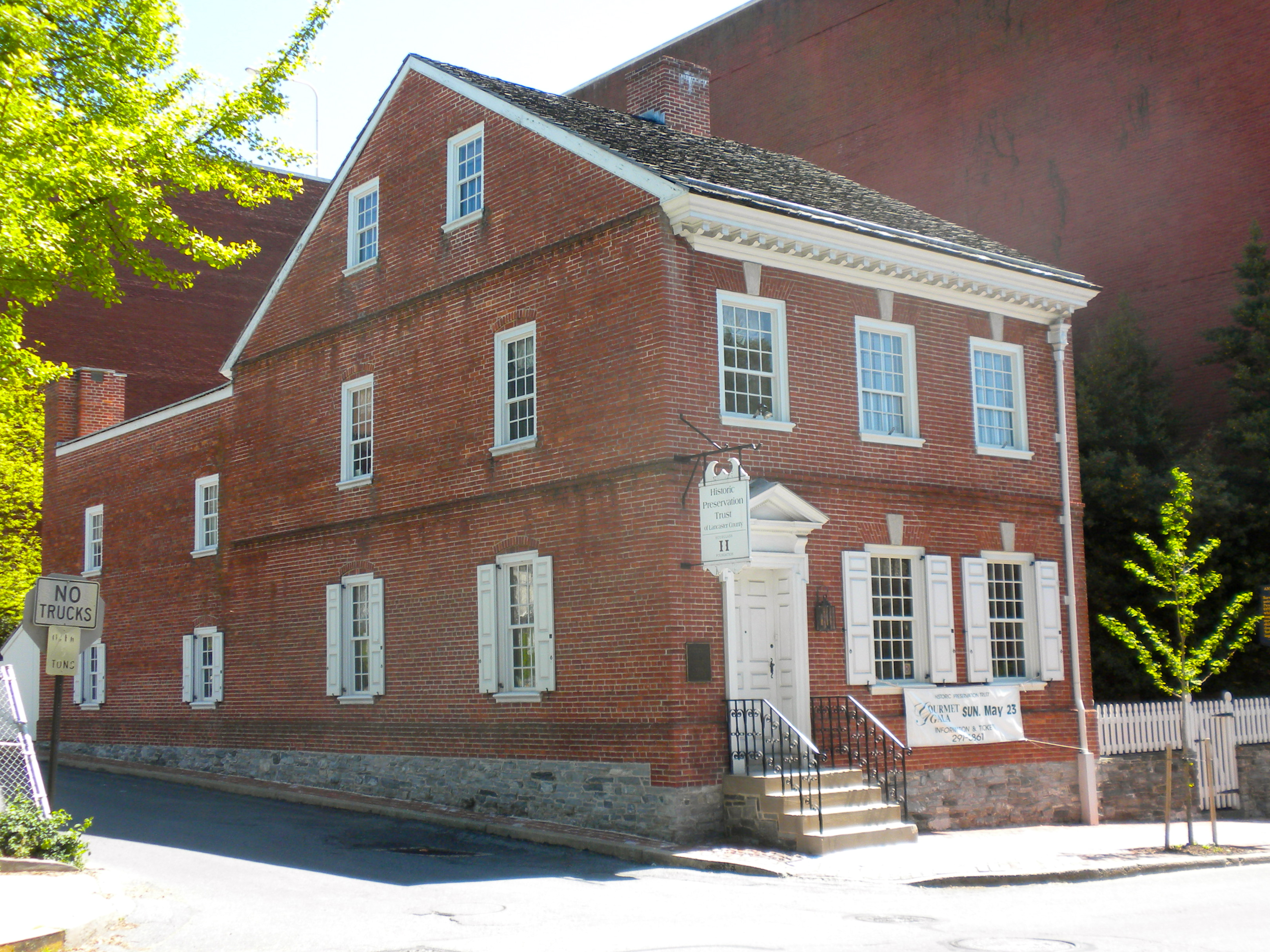
- Ellicott House, April 2010

- Location within Pennsylvania Location within the United States
- Location: 123 N. Prince St., Lancaster, Pennsylvania
- Coordinates: 40°2′22″N 76°18′28″W
- Area: 0.2 acres (0.081 ha)
- Built: c. 1780
- Built by: Sehner, George
- Architectural style: Georgian
- NRHP reference No.: 72001128
- Added to NRHP: January 13, 1972

Sehner-Ellicott-Von Hess House is a historic home located at 123 N. Prince Street, Lancaster, Pennsylvania. It was built about 1780 by George Sehner, and is a finely restored house built in the Georgian style of architecture. It was occupied by Andrew Ellicott (1754–1820), first United States Surveyor General, from 1801 to 1813. Ellicott helped prepare Captain Meriwether Lewis for his exploration of the Louisiana Purchase.

It was listed on the National Register of Historic Places in 1972. It is now the home of the Historic Preservation Trust of Lancaster County, and open to visitors.
