= Andrew Ellicott =

American surveyor (1754–1820)

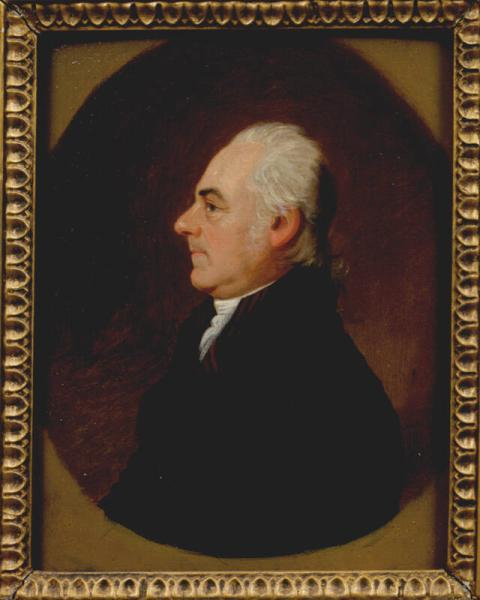
- Portrait by Jacob Eichholtz, 1809
- Born: January 24, 1754; Buckingham Township, Province of Pennsylvania, British America
- Died: August 28, 1820 (aged 66); West Point, New York, U.S.
- Occupations: Surveyor and town planner
- Known for: Surveying many territories west of the Appalachians, the boundaries of the District of Columbia, and completing Pierre (Peter) Charles L'Enfant's plan for Washington
- Spouse: Sarah Brown

Andrew Ellicott (January 24, 1754 – August 28, 1820) was an American land surveyor who helped map many of the territories west of the Appalachians, surveyed the boundaries of the District of Columbia, continued and completed Pierre (Peter) Charles L'Enfant's work on the plan for Washington, D.C., and served as a teacher in survey methods for Meriwether Lewis.

== Early life ==
Andrew Ellicott was born in Buckingham Township, Bucks County, Pennsylvania as the first of nine children of Joseph Ellicott (1732–1780) and his wife Judith (née Blaker or Bleaker, 1729–1809). The Quaker family lived in modest conditions; his father was a miller and clockmaker. Young Andrew was educated at the local Quaker school, where Robert Patterson, who later became a professor and vice provost at the University of Pennsylvania in Philadelphia, was his teacher for some time. Andrew was a talented mechanic like many of the family and showed some mathematical talent, too.

In 1770, his father, together with his uncles Andrew and John, purchased land on the falls of the Patapsco River, upriver and west of Baltimore and the Chesapeake Bay. There they set up a new milling business, founding the town of Ellicott's Mills in 1772 (today's Ellicott City, Maryland). Three years later, Andrew married Sarah Brown (1756/8–1827) of Newtown, Pennsylvania, with whom he would have ten children, one of which died as a child. When the Revolutionary War broke out in 1775, Andrew enlisted as a commissioned officer in the Elk Ridge Battalion of the newly organized Maryland state militia despite his Quaker upbringing. During the course of the war, he rose to the rank of major, a title he would keep as an honorific throughout his life.

== Survey work ==
After the war, Ellicott returned home to Ellicott's Mills until he was appointed, in 1784, a member of the survey group tasked with extending the survey of the Mason–Dixon line for the borders between Pennsylvania / Delaware with Maryland that had been abandoned in 1767 and then been stalled during the war. In this survey, he worked alongside David Rittenhouse and Bishop James Madison, making first connections with the scientific society of Philadelphia.

Following the death of their second son, the Ellicotts moved to Baltimore in 1785, where Andrew taught mathematics at the Baltimore Academy and was even elected to the Maryland General Assembly (state legislature) in 1786. The same year, he was called upon for a survey to define the western border of Pennsylvania with the Ohio Country. This "Ellicott Line" (running north–south at longitude meridian 80°31′12″W) later became the principal meridian for the surveys of the future Northwest Territory of the United States. His work in Pennsylvania intensified his ties with Rittenhouse and other members of the American Philosophical Society, to which he had been elected a member in 1785, and led to encounters with Benjamin Franklin and Simeon De Witt. When he was subsequently appointed to lead other surveys in Pennsylvania, the family moved again in 1789 to Philadelphia. By recommendation of Franklin, Ellicott got a position with the newly established government under the Constitution and was tasked by first President George Washington to survey the lands between Lake Erie and Pennsylvania to determine the border between Western New York and U.S. federal territory, resulting in the Erie Triangle. This survey, during which he also made the first topographical study of the Niagara River including the Niagara Falls, gained Ellicott a reputation for superb accuracy in surveys.

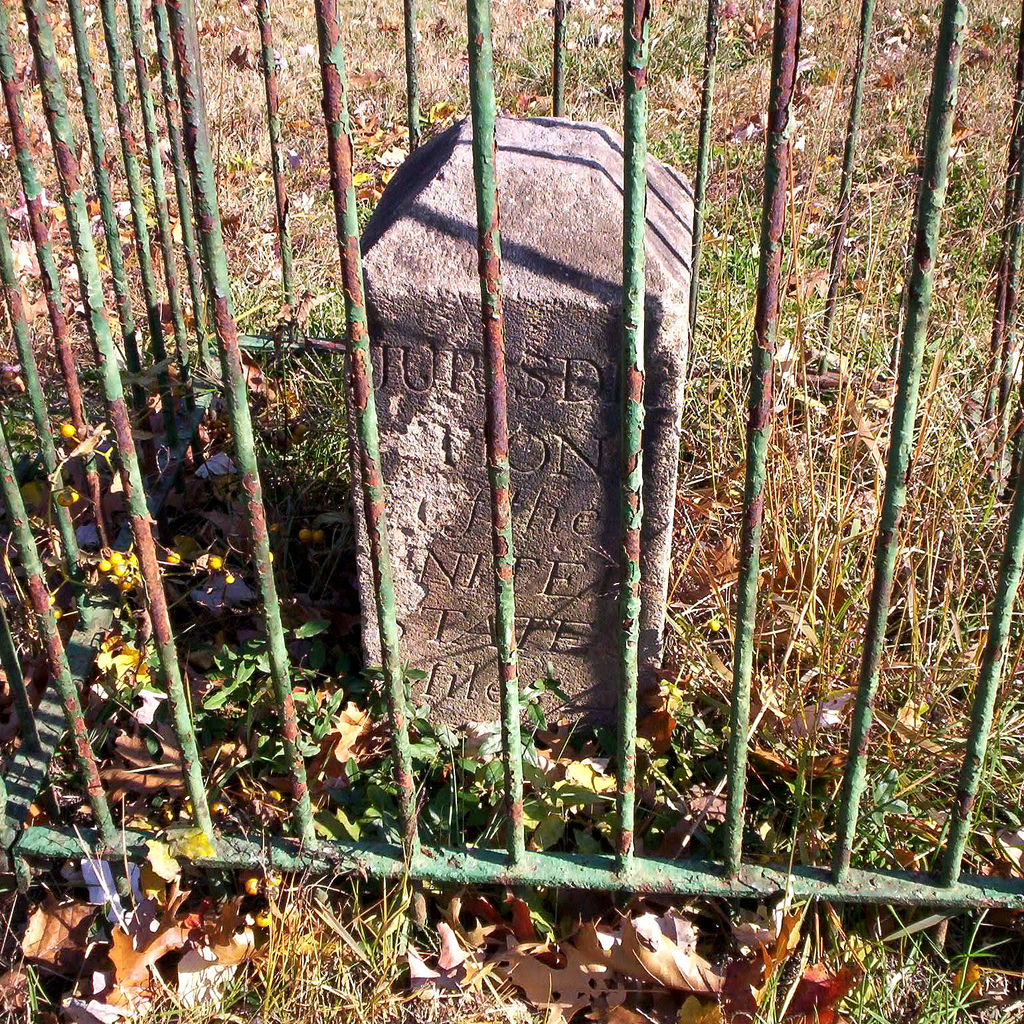
Northeast No. 4 boundary marker stone of the original District of Columbia in Washington, D.C. and Prince George's County, Maryland (2005)

From 1791 to 1792, at the request of Secretary of State Thomas Jefferson, Ellicott worked under the direction of the three commissioners that President George Washington had appointed, surveying the boundaries of the federal Territory of Columbia, which would become the District of Columbia in 1801, containing the Federal City also then becoming known as "Washington City". Ellicott began his survey in February 1791, just prior to the arrival of L'Enfant. He was assisted in this survey first by the free African-American astronomer Benjamin Banneker and then by Ellicott's brothers, Joseph Ellicott and Benjamin Ellicott. Ellicott's team put into place forty boundary stones approximately 1 mile (2 km) apart from each other that marked the borders of the Territory of Columbia of 100 square miles (260 km^{2}) (see: Boundary Markers of the Original District of Columbia). Most of these stones remain in their original positions. As engravings on many of the stones still show, Ellicott's team placed those that marked the southwestern /southeastern border with Virginia in 1791, and those that marked the northwestern / northeastern border with Maryland in 1792.

On January 1, 1793, Ellicott submitted to the three commissioners "a report of his first map of the four lines of experiment, showing a half mile on each side, including the district of territory, with a survey of the different waters within the territory". The Library of Congress has attributed to 1793 Ellicott's earliest map of the Territory of Columbia that the Library holds within its collections.

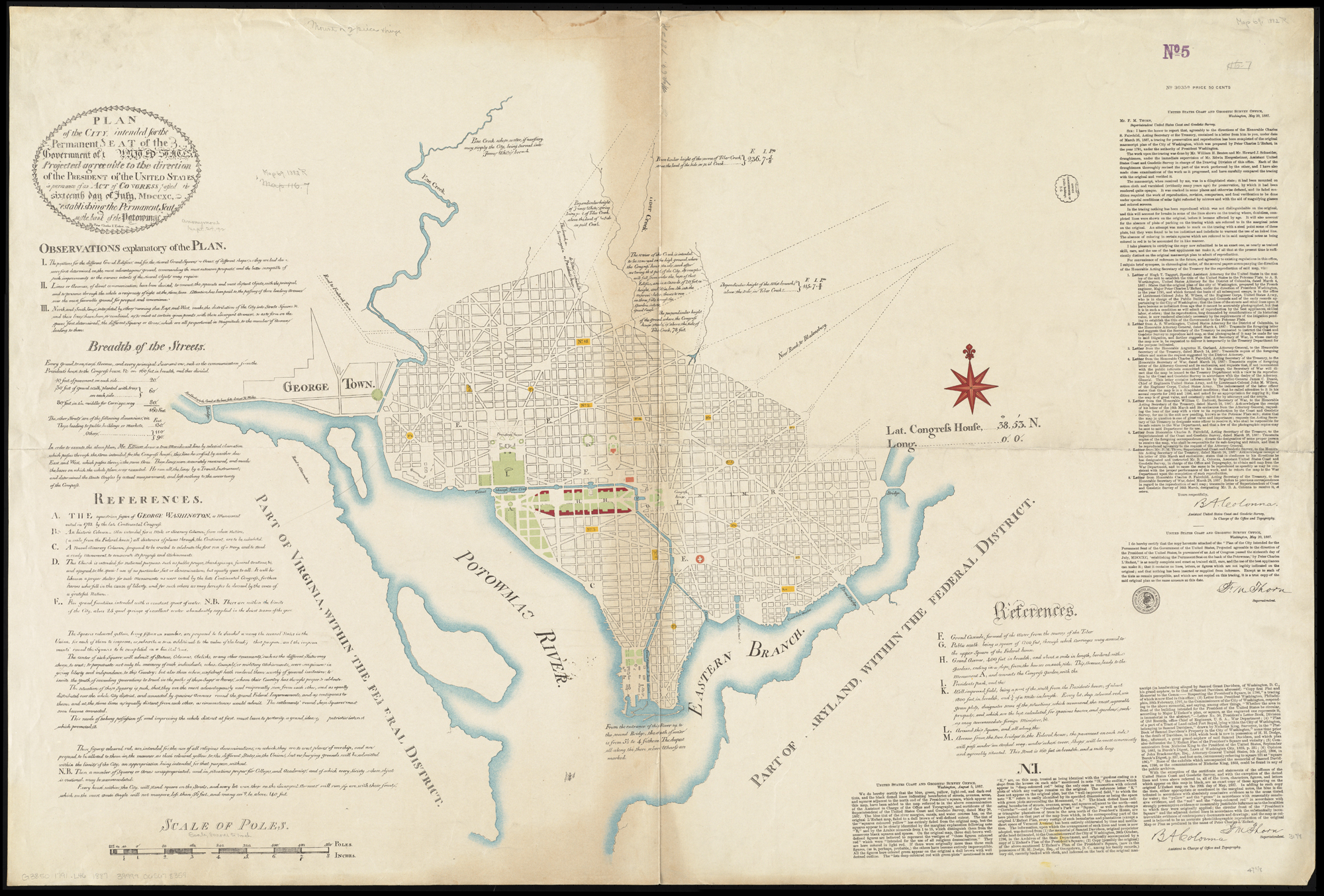
^{Boston Public Library} Facsimile of manuscript of Peter Charles L'Enfant's 1791 plan for the federal capital city (United States Coast and Geodetic Survey, 1887).

^{Library of Congress} Thackara & Vallance's March 1792 print of Ellicott's Plan of the City of Washington.

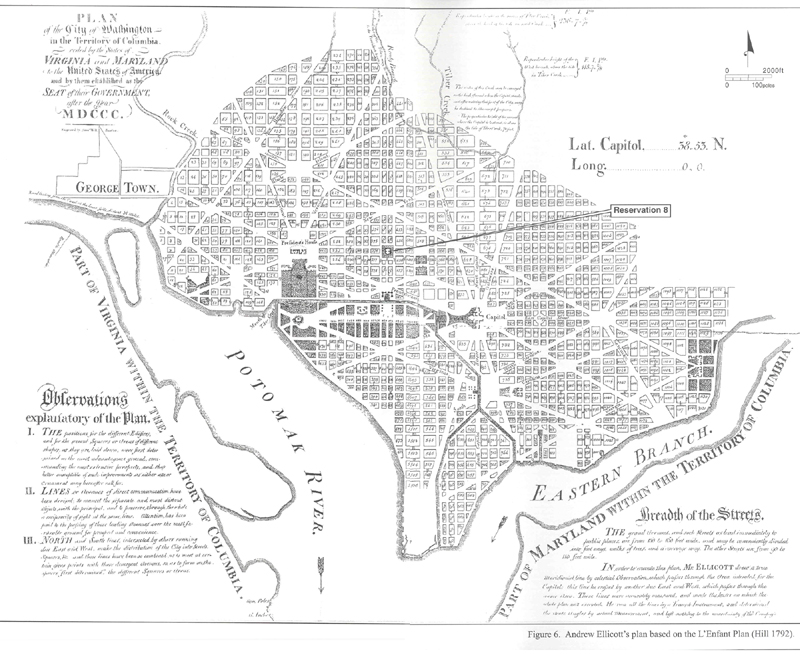
A contemporary reprint of Samuel Hill's 1792 print of Ellicott's Plan of the City of Washington in the Territory of Columbia, showing street names, lot numbers, coordinates and legends.

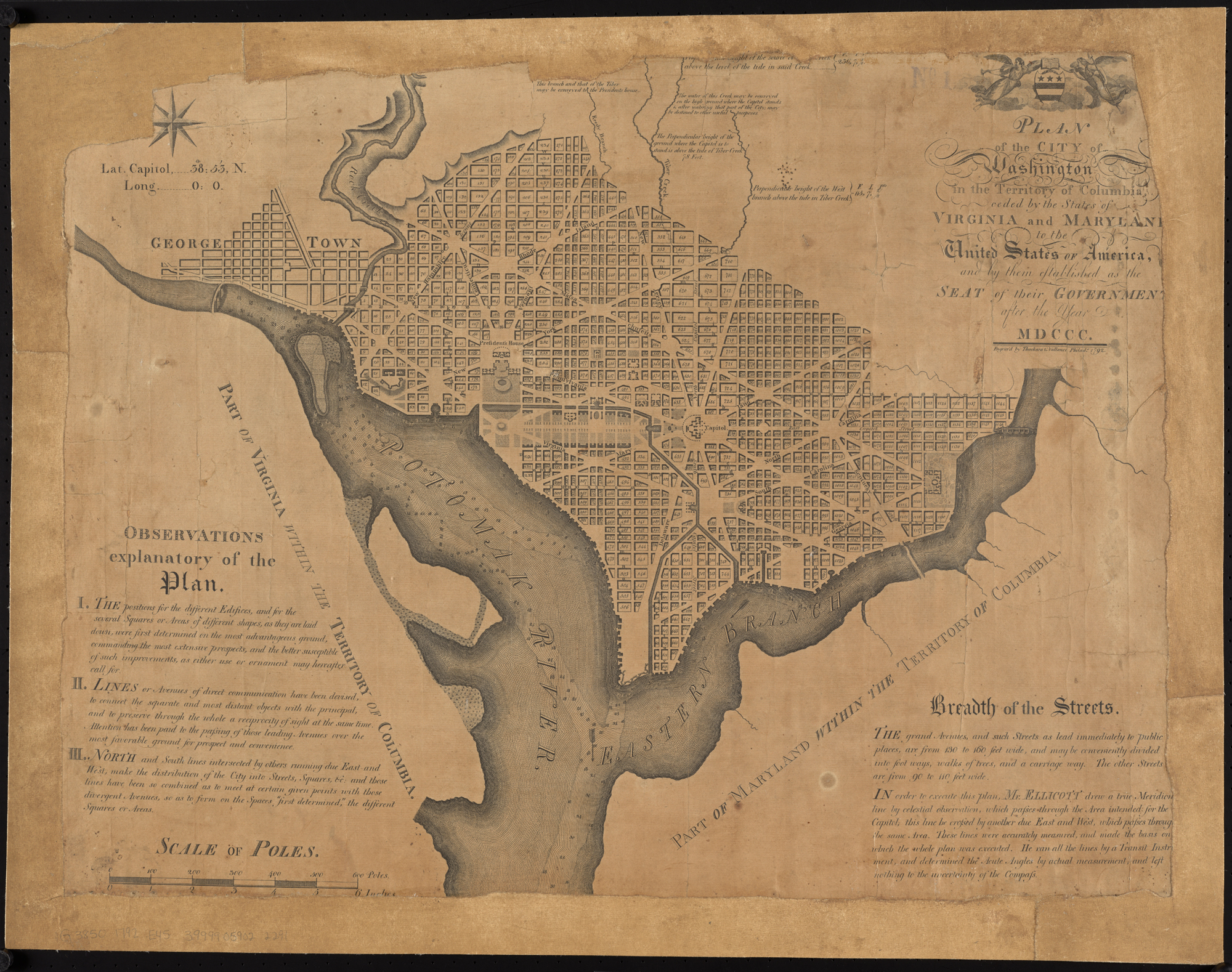
^{Boston Public Library} Thackara & Vallance's 1792 print of Ellicott's Plan of the City of Washington in the Territory of Columbia, showing street names, lot numbers, depths of the Potomak River, coordinates and legends.

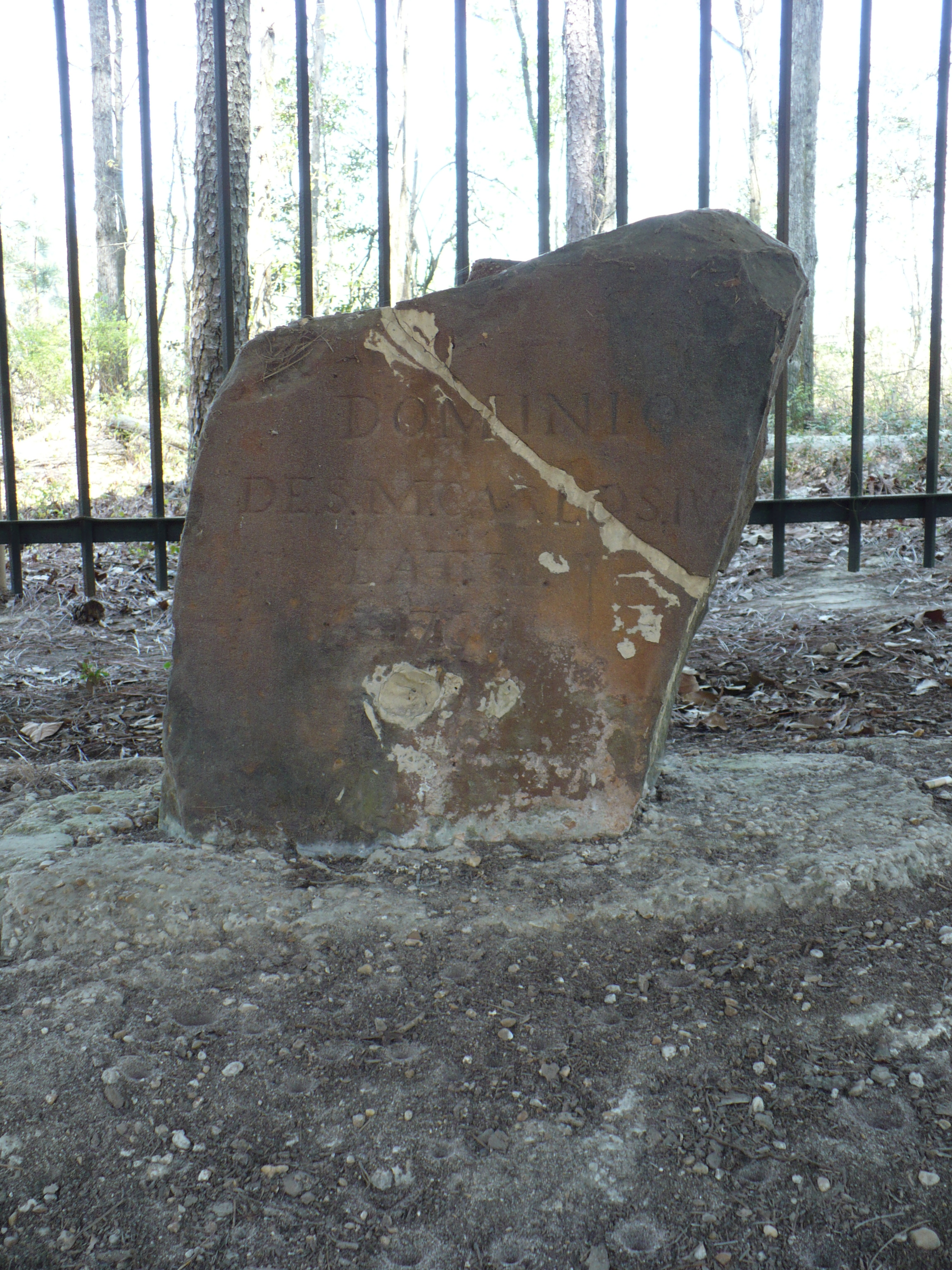
The south side of the Ellicott Stone, south of Bucks, Alabama. It reads: Dominio De S.M. Carlos IV, Lat. 31, 1799. (2009)

During 1791–1792, Ellicott also surveyed the future city of Washington, which was located within a relatively small area at the center of the Territory of Columbia along the northern bank of the Potomac River at the confluence with its Eastern Branch (known today as the Anacostia River). Ellicott also served under the Commissioners' supervision in this effort. He first worked with Pierre (Peter) Charles L'Enfant, who had prepared the initial plans for the future capital city during the early months of 1791 and had presented one of these early plans to President Washington in August of that year (see L'Enfant Plan).

During a contentious period in February 1792, Ellicott informed the Commissioners that L'Enfant had not been able to have the city plan engraved and printed as a map on paper and had refused to provide him with an original plan that L'Enfant was then holding. Ellicott, with the aid of his brother, Benjamin Ellicott, then revised the plan, despite L'Enfant's protests.

Ellicott stated in his letters that, although he was refused the original plan, he was familiar with L'Enfant's system and had many notes of the surveys that he had made himself. It is therefore possible that Ellicott recreated the plan. Ellicott's revisions realigned and straightened the diagonal Massachusetts Avenue, eliminated five short other radial avenues and added two others, removed several plazas and straightened the borders of the future Judiciary Square.

As the conflicts grew between the contending parties shortly thereafter, President Washington dismissed L'Enfant. Ellicott gave the first version of his own plan to James Thakara and John Valance of Philadelphia, who engraved, printed and published it. This version, printed in March 1792, was the first Washington city plan that received wide circulation.

After L'Enfant departed, Ellicott continued the city survey in accordance with his revised plan, several larger and more detailed versions of which were also engraved, published, printed and distributed. As a result, Ellicott's revisions became the basis for the capital city's future development. He left the City of Washington project in the summer of 1793, relieved to escape the political pressures surrounding that venture.

In 1794, Ellicott accepted a commission from the Commonwealth of Pennsylvania to plan the city of Erie on the southeastern shore of Lake Erie, giving the Keystone State a future port on the Great Lakes and its increasing trade. He spent the next two years with this task, plotting a road from Reading, Pennsylvania, to Presqu'Isle, where the port city was to be built, and also supervising the construction of Fort Erie.

In 1796, George Washington commissioned Ellicott as the U.S. representative on the commission for the survey of the southern border between the Spanish territories along the Gulf of Mexico coast in Florida and the United States as negotiated in the Treaty of San Lorenzo (also known as Treaty of Madrid) of 1795. Ellicott travelled with a military escort from Pittsburgh via the Ohio and Mississippi rivers and worked together with Spanish commissioners, despite many difficulties, for the next four years. Ellicott's assistants on the survey were his son Andrew Ellicott Jr. and David Gillespie. A Mississippian, possibly a descendant of Isaac Guion, hinted at some of the difficulties Ellicott had in the unfamiliar political and social climate of pre-territorial Mississippi, writing, "Ellicott was a Pennsylvania quaker by birth and education; by some knowledge of natural history, astronomy and botany, he had recommended himself to Mr. Jefferson; but he was vain, weak, ambitious and obstinate, and wholly unfit for a position that demanded something more than civil engineering. Pope was a mere martinet, and easily became the tool of Ellicott."

Another "Ellicott's Line" from this survey, running along latitude parallel 31° North, still defines the border today between the future states of Alabama and Florida. One of his many stone markers for the boundary line, the Ellicott Stone, is now located within a historical park about a mile south of Bucks, Alabama.

In 1798, Ellicott complained to the government about four American generals receiving pensions from Spain, including General in Chief James Wilkinson, raising the specter of treason, which later involved Vice President (during Jefferson's first term), Aaron Burr. Ellicott showed considerable diplomatic talent during this joint project to bring it to a successful completion, and he presented his final report with maps to the government in 1800. (The Mapping episode of Philip Morrison's miniseries The Ring Of Truth illustrates Ellicott's surveying methods from Ellicott Hill in Natchez, Mississippi, which is now another National Historic Landmark.)

The following Adams administration, however, then refused to pay Ellicott for his work done in this survey, and even refused him access to his maps he had submitted with the report. He was forced to sell some of his possessions, including books from his library, in order to support his family. Finally the maps were released in 1803 under the subsequent Jefferson administration, and Ellicott published his Journal of Andrew Ellicott detailing the Florida survey, including the maps. The journal includes his account of the Leonid meteor storm of November 12, 1799, which he watched from his vessel off Key Largo, writing that "the whole heavens appeared as if illuminated with skyrockets, flying in an infinity of directions".

Jefferson, now president, then offered Ellicott the post of Surveyor General of the Northwest Territory. However, Ellicott refused the appointment. His prior negative experiences with the government political administrations may have had something to do with this, but at the age of 49, he also wanted to spend more time with his family and feared that this new position might require him to travel too much.

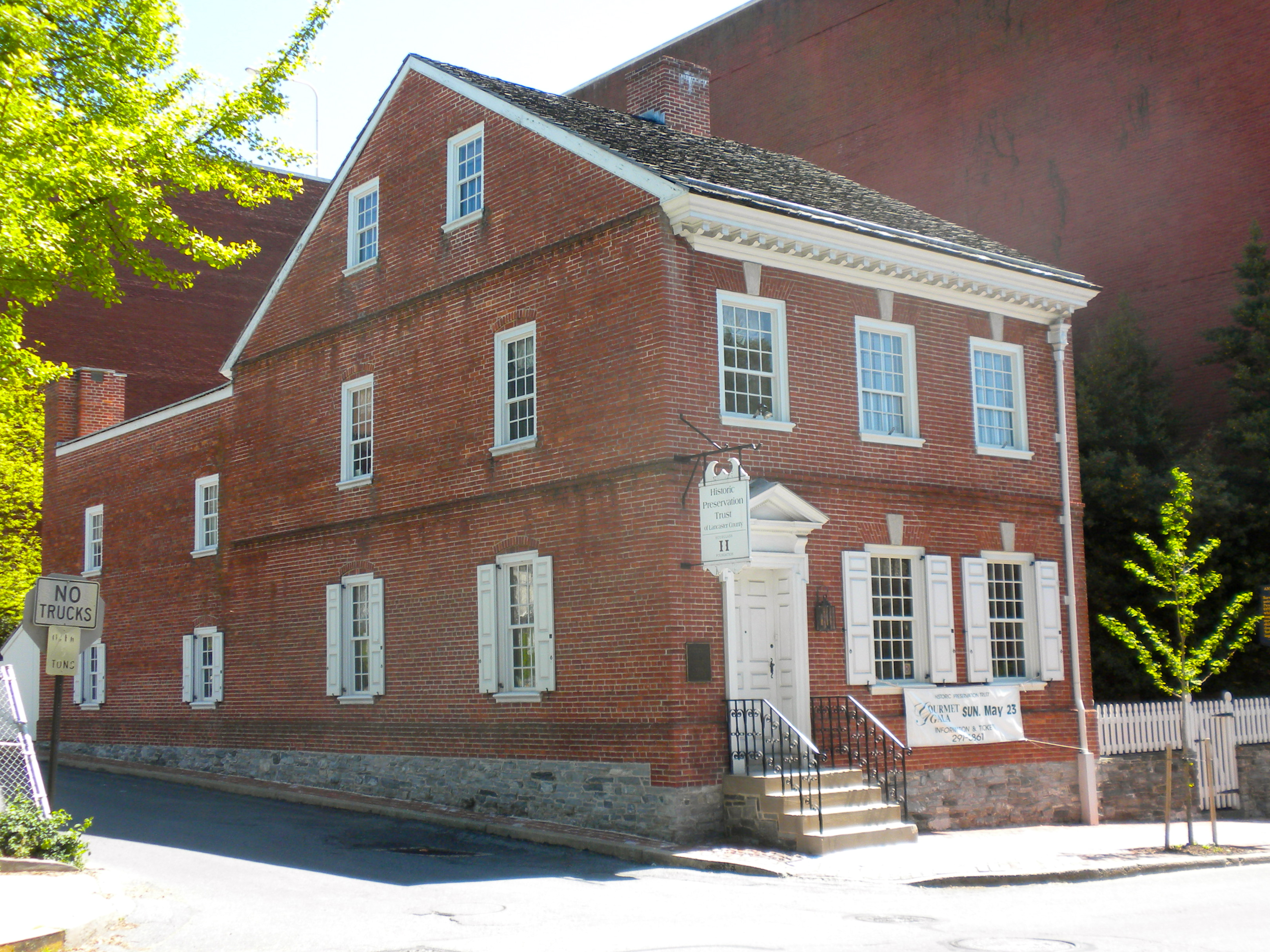
Ellicott's house at 123 North Prince Street, Lancaster, Pennsylvania is listed on the National Register of Historic Places

Ellicott instead accepted an offer by Pennsylvania governor Thomas McKean and took a position as Secretary of the Pennsylvania Land Office. The family moved to Lancaster, Pennsylvania, and Ellicott seemed content with a clerk's job that left him enough time for his own scientific and private interests and that provided a steady income for the family. The Andrew Ellicott House, in Lancaster where he resided from 1801 to 1813, was listed on the National Register of Historic Places in 1972, by the National Park Service.

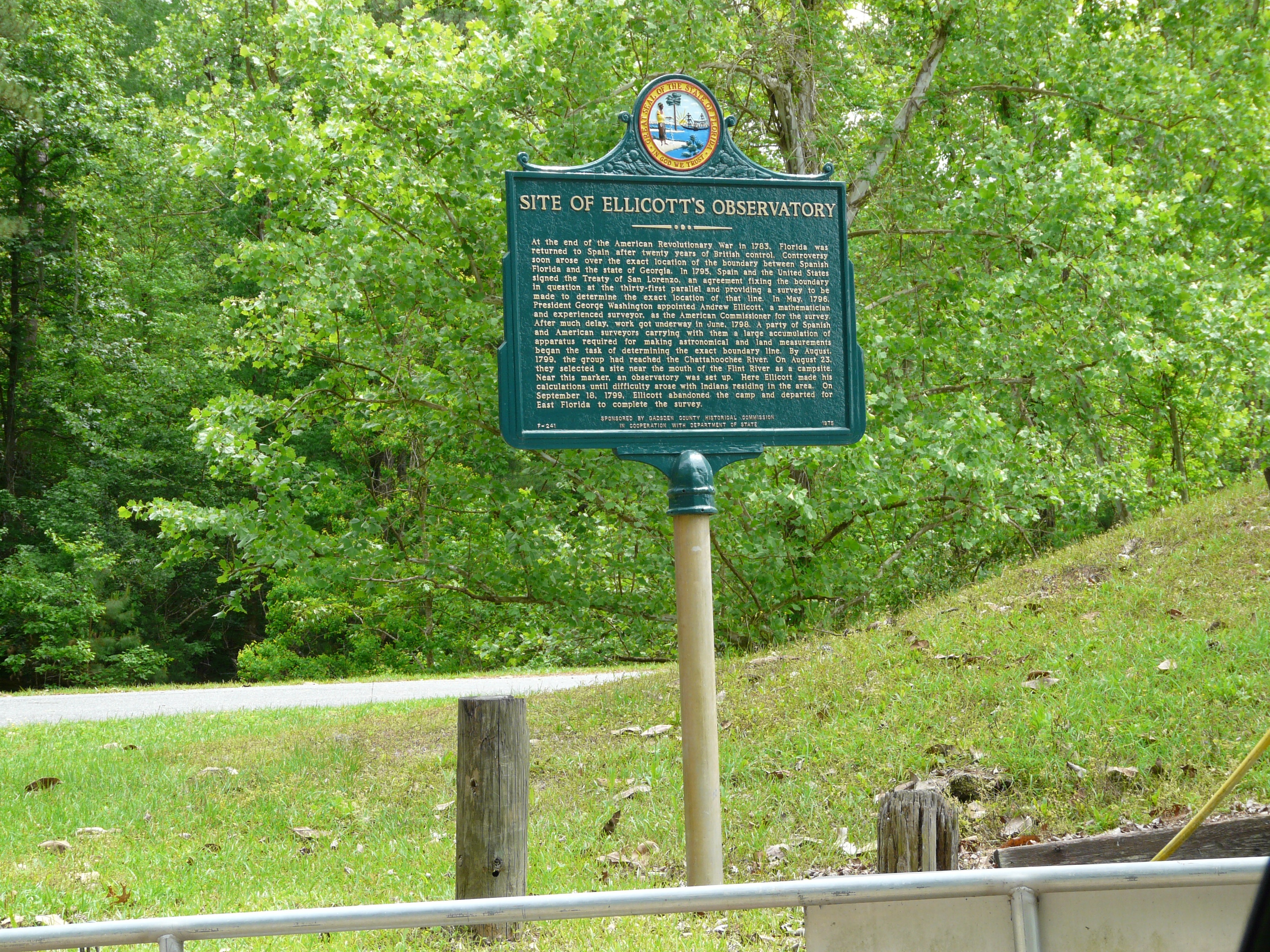
Historical marker for Ellicott's observatory in Chattahoochee, Florida

Also in 1803, President Jefferson engaged Ellicott as a mentor and teacher for Meriwether Lewis, one of the leaders of the Lewis and Clark Expedition that was to start the following year. From April to May 1803, Lewis stayed at Ellicott's home and studied survey techniques, and Ellicott made many recommendations on the expedition's equipment and survey procedures that were later followed. The two men apparently got along well.

When Simon Snyder followed McKean as governor of Pennsylvania, he fired Ellicott in 1809 due to political differences. A prominent supporter of Snyder was former General in Chief James Wilkinson, one of the four generals that Ellicott had denounced eleven years earlier and had come under a cloud of treason, along with Vice President Aaron Burr. Ellicott returned to private practice and was hired in February 1811 by David B. Mitchell, then governor of Georgia, to re-survey the border between Georgia and North Carolina to settle a border dispute between these two states. Although he started out in July, his expedition was delayed and had to work throughout the hard winter. Ellicott confirmed earlier findings that the border, which was supposed to follow latitude 35°N, was several miles further south than the Georgians claimed. His report was not well received by the Georgian administration, who furthermore refused to pay his fees. Ellicott returned in July 1812 to Pennsylvania.

In 1813, Ellicott accepted a position as a professor for mathematics at the United States Military Academy at West Point, and the family left Lancaster and moved to West Point, New York. In 1817, Ellicott was again called upon to participate as astronomer in a field survey, namely a re-survey – agreed upon in the Treaty of Ghent – of the Collins–Valentine line. It was the last significant survey that he performed. Ellicott died three years later from a stroke in his home at West Point.

== In memoriam ==
Andrew Ellicott Park at the West Cornerstone, located in Arlington County, the City of Falls Church and Fairfax County in Northern Virginia at the original west corner of the District of Columbia, memorializes Ellicott. Ellicott Circle and Ellicott Street in the District of Columbia also memorialize him.

== Publications and archives ==
- Ellicott, Andrew, and David Gillespie. n.d. Andrew Ellicott papers. Correspondence, maps, charts, and reports of astronomical observations chiefly concerning Ellicott's work in surveying the boundary between the U.S. and Florida under the San Lorenzo Treaty (1795) and also his surveys of the city of Washington, the boundary between Georgia and South Carolina, the town of Presque Isle (later Erie), Pa., and the boundary between the U.S. and Canada under the Treaty of Ghent (1814). Other subjects discussed are international politics, Indian affairs, and the Blount conspiracy (1797). Includes papers of Ellicott's assistant David Gillespie. Family correspondents include Ellicott's wife Sarah and his brother Joseph. Other correspondents include Daniel Clark, Jr., William Dunbar, Manuel Gayoso de Lemos, David Gillespie, Benjamin Hawkins, Thomas Jefferson, James Madison, Stephen Minor, Robert Patterson, Timothy Pickering, John Pitchlynn, Winthrop Sargent, Cornelius P. Van Ness, and James Wilkinson. 925 items. 7 containers. 2 microfilm reels. 1.1 linear feet.
- Andrew Ellicott. 1818. "Astronomical Observations, &c. Communicated by Andrew Ellicott, Esq." Transactions of the American Philosophical Society, New Series, Vol. 1, (1818), pp. 93–101.
- United States, Isaac Briggs, Andrew Ellicott, Albert Gallatin, John Garnett, F. R. Hassler, James Madison, Joshua John Moore, Robert Patterson, and Roger Chew Weightman. 1811. Message from the president of the U. States, transmitting a report of the secretary of the Treasury, on the execution of the act providing for the survey of the coast of the U. States.: February 4, 1811. Printed by order of the Senate of the United States. Washington City [D.C.]: Printed by R.C. Weightman. President's message, addressed to the Senate, signed on p. [3]: James Madison. Letter of transmittal from the Dept. of the Treasury signed on p [4]: Albert Gallatin. Includes a circular letter from Albert Gallatin to Robert Patterson, Andrew Ellicott, F.R. Hassler, John Garnett, Isaac Briggs, Joshua J. Moore and James Madison, outlining the broad scope of the proposed survey and requesting the name of "any person whom you might recommend as capable of acting in the different parts of the work," followed by the response of each.
- Andrew Ellicott. 1809. "A Short and Easy Rule for Finding the Equation for the Change of the Sun's Declination When Equal Altitudes Are Used to Regulate a Clock or Other Time Keeper. Communicated by Andrew Ellicott Esq." Transactions of the American Philosophical Society, Vol. 6, (1809), pp. 26–28.
- Robert Patterson and Andrew Ellicott. 1809. "Improved Method of Projecting and Measuring Plane Angles by Mr. Robert Patterson Communicated by Mr. Andrew Ellicott." Transactions of the American Philosophical Society, Vol. 6, (1809), pp. 29–32.
- Andrew Ellicott. 1809. "Astronomical Observations Made at Lancaster, Pennsylvania, Chiefly with a View to Ascertain the Longitude of That Borough, and as a Test of the Accuracy with Which the Longitude May Be Found by Lunar Observation; In a Letter from Andrew Ellicott to Robert Patterson." Transactions of the American Philosophical Society, Vol. 6, (1809), pp. 61–69.
- Andrew Ellicott. 1809. "Observations of the Eclipse of the Sun, June 16th, 1806; Made at Lancaster." Transactions of the American Philosophical Society, Vol. 6, (1809), pp. 255–260.
- Andrew Ellicott. 1809. "Continuation of the Astronomical Observations Made at Lancaster, in Pennsylvania." Transactions of the American Philosophical Society, Vol. 6, (1809), pp. 233–235.
- Jose Joaquin de Ferrer, Andrew Ellicott, Julian Ortis de Canelas and M. Mechain. 1809. "The Geographical Position of Sundry Places in North America, and in the W. Indies, Calculated by J. J. de Ferrer." Transactions of the American Philosophical Society, Vol. 6, (1809), pp. 221–232.
- Evans, Evan, Andrew Ellicott, and Oliver Evans. 1807. Patent cyder, or tobacco press. Philadelphia, Pa: s.n. A patent license. Title from caption of illustration; text begins: Explanation. A, the cheese of pumice, or hogshead of tobacco, &c. signed: Evan Evans. Testimonial signed and dated: Andrew Ellicott. Lancaster, Pennsylvania, June 2, 1806. Manufacturer's statement, dated "Mars works, Philadelphia, April 30, 1807" and signed: Oliver Evans. Illustration signed: F. Shallus engraver No. 80 South Front St. Philada. Printed on paper watermarked "W Young 1804" (Gravell 1054).
- Ellicott, Andrew. 1803. The journal of Andrew Ellicott, late commissioner on behalf of the United States during part of the year 1796, the years 1797, 1798, 1799, and part of the year 1800 for determining the boundary between the United States and the possessions of His Catholic Majesty in America, containing occasional remarks on the situation, soil, rivers, natural productions, and diseases of the different countries on the Mississippi, and gulf of Mexico, with six maps comprehending the Ohio, the Mississippi from the mouth of the Ohio to the gulf of Mexico, the whole of West Florida, and part of East Florida; to which is added an appendix, containing all the astronomical observations made use of for determining the boundary ... likewise a great number of thermometrical observations. Philadelphia: Budd & Bartram, for Thomas Dobson.
- Andrew Ellicott. 1802. "Astronomical, and Thermometrical Observations, Made at the Confluence of the Mississippi, and Ohio Rivers." Transactions of the American Philosophical Society, Vol. 5, (1802), pp. 162–202.
- Andrew Ellicott. 1802. "Astronomical, and Thermometrical Observations, Made on the Boundary between the United States and His Catholic Majesty." Transactions of the American Philosophical Society, Vol. 5, (1802), pp. 203–311.
- Andrew Ellicott. 1799. "A Letter from Mr. Andrew Ellicott, to Mr. Robert Patterson. A Method of Calculating the Eccentric Anomaly of the Planets." Transactions of the American Philosophical Society, Vol. 4, (1799), pp. 67–69.
- Andrew Ellicott. 1799. "Observations Made on the Old French Landing at Presqu' Isle, to Determine the Latitude of the Town of Erie. In a Letter from Andrew Ellicott, to Robert Patterson Secretary of the Society." Transactions of the American Philosophical Society, Vol. 4, (1799), pp. 231–232.
- Andrew Ellicott. 1799. "Miscellaneous Observations Relative to the Western Parts of Pennsylvania, Particularly Those in the Neighbourhood of Lake Erie." Transactions of the American Philosophical Society, Vol. 4, (1799), pp. 224–230.
- Andrew Ellicott. 1799. "A Letter from Mr. Andrew Ellicott, to Robert Patterson; In Two Parts. Part First Contains a Number of Astronomical Observations. Part Second Contains the Theory and Method of Calculating the Aberration of the Stars, the Nutation of the Earth's Axis, and the Semiannual Equation." Transactions of the American Philosophical Society, Vol. 4, (1799), pp. 32–66.
- Andrew Ellicott and R. Patterson. 1799. "Observations for Determining the Latitude and Longitude of the Town of Natchez. By Andrew Ellicott, Esq. Commissioner on the Part of the United States, for Running the Line of Demarkation between Them and the Spanish Territory. Communicated to the Society by R. Patterson." Transactions of the American Philosophical Society, Vol. 4, (1799), pp. 447–451.
- United States, and Andrew Ellicott. 1798. Message from the President of the United States, accompanying a report to him from the secretary of state, and sundry documents relative to the affairs of the United States on the Mississippi the intercourse with the Indian nations, and the inexecution of the treaty between the United States and Spain. Philadelphia: Printed by W. Ross. Twenty-third January, 1798, ordered to lie on the table. Published by order of the House of Representatives.
- Andrew Ellicott. 1793. "Extract of a Letter from Andrew Ellicott, to David Rittenhouse, Esq. Dated at Pittsburg, November 5th 1787, Containing Observations Made at Lake-Erie, on That Singular Phenomenon, by Seamen Termed Looming." Transactions of the American Philosophical Society, Vol. 3, (1793), pp. 62–63.
- Andrew Ellicott. 1793. "Accurate Determination of the Right Ascension and Declination of β Bootes, and the Pole Star: In a Letter from Mr. Andrew Ellicott to Mr. R. Patterson." Transactions of the American Philosophical Society, Vol. 3, (1793), pp. 116–118.
- Ellicott, Andrew. 1792. Territory annexed to the State of Pennsylvania: containing two hundred and two thousand one hundred and eighty seven acres. Shows two sides of the stone boundary marker between Pennsylvania and New York.
- Ellicott, Andrew, and William Irvine. 1790. Plan of the town of Waterford, Pennsylvania. Photostats of original manuscript map done ca. 1795 located in the Pennsylvania State Archives. Includes legend. Alternate title: A correct Plan of the Town of Waterford and out-lots. Relief shown by shading. Description: 1 map on 2 sheets: photocopies; 52 x 72 cm. Other Titles: Correct plan of the town of Waterford and out-lots.
- Ellicott, Andrew. 1787. Ellicott's Virginia, Maryland, and Pennsylvania almanack, for the year of our Lord, 1788; being leap-year, and the twelfth year of American independence. Containing the motions of the sun and moon, the true places and aspects of the planets, the rising and setting of the sun, and the rising, setting, southing, and age of the moon, &c. Likewise, the lunations, conjunctions, eclipses, judgment of the weather, rising and setting of most of the principal fixed stars, length of days, and Quakers yearly meetings; days for holding courts in Pennsylvania, Delaware, Maryland, and Virginia; several valuable physical receipts; and some useful tables, both curious and interesting; with the remarkable American occurrences, &c. &c. The whole comprising a great variety of matter, both useful and entertaining. Winchester: printed and sold by Bartgis & Willcocks, at their printing-office, where all manner of printing is executed with fidelity and dispatch. Also to be had at the English and German printing-office, in Frederick-Town, Maryland." The astronomical part of this work was calculated by that ingenious mathematician Andrew Ellicott, Esq; of this state."—Preface.
- Ellicott, Andrew. 1790. "Description of the Falls of Niagara". The Massachusetts Magazine, or, Monthly Museum of Knowledge and Rational Entertainment. 2 (7). Pages 387–388.

== See also ==
- Clarksville, Mississippi, the last base Ellicott used to survey the 31st latitude
- David Bates Douglass, son-in-law
- History of Washington, D.C.
- West Virginia-Pennsylvania Sinclair Cornerstone
