= Andrew Ellicott (miller) =

Miller who founded Ellicott City, Maryland

- Born: 1733; Bucks County
- Died: 1809 (aged 75–76); Maryland
- Children: George, Johnathan, Elias

Andrew Ellicott (1733 – 1809) was one of three Quaker brothers from Bucks County, Province of Pennsylvania who chose the wilderness up river from Elk Ridge Landing (known today as Elkridge, Maryland) to establish a flour mill. John, Andrew, and Joseph Ellicott founded Ellicott's Mills which became one of the largest milling and manufacturing towns in the East.

The Ellicott brothers helped revolutionize farming in the area by persuading farmers to plant wheat instead of tobacco and also by introducing fertilizer to revitalize depleted soil. Charles Carroll, a signer of the Declaration of Independence, was an early influential convert from tobacco to wheat. Andrew worked principally as a financier leaving his interests to his sons. His sons Jonathan and George Ellicott built their home by the river in Oella, Maryland.

Andrew Ellicott was the uncle of the famous surveyors Andrew Ellicott and Joseph Ellicott.
