= John Ellicott (miller) =

Ellicott, John
- Born: John Ellicott; December 28, 1739; Bucks County, Pennsylvania
- Died: December 28, 1794 (aged 55)
- Spouse: Cassandra
- Children: John Jr. (-1820), William (-1838), Nathanial H.

John Ellicott (December 28, 1739 – December 28, 1794) was one of three Quaker brothers from Bucks County, Pennsylvania who chose the picturesque wilderness up river from Elk Ridge Landing (known today as Elkridge, Maryland) to establish a flour mill. John and Andrew Ellicott moved to Baltimore County, Maryland in May 1771 purchasing 50 acres of Baltimore County land from Emanuel Teal and 35 acres from William Williams. John, Andrew, and Joseph Ellicott founded Ellicott's Mills which became one of the largest milling and manufacturing towns in the East.

The Ellicott brothers helped revolutionize farming in the area by persuading farmers to plant wheat instead of tobacco and also by introducing fertilizer to revitalize depleted soil. Charles Carroll, a signer of the Declaration of Independence, was an early influential convert from tobacco to wheat.

Cassandra Ellicott remarried in 1800 at the opening of the Quaker Meeting House.

John Ellicott was the uncle of surveyors Andrew Ellicott and Joseph Ellicott.
