= Joseph Ellicott (miller) =

American miller, founded Ellicott City

Joseph Ellicott (1732–1780) was one of three Quaker brothers from Bucks County, Pennsylvania Province, who purchased land on the Patapsco River and set up a new milling business there. Joseph, Andrew, and John founded Ellicott's Mills in 1772, which became one of the largest milling and manufacturing towns in the East.

Joseph Ellicott and his wife, Judith (born Blaker), had ten children, including the surveyors Andrew Ellicott, Joseph Ellicott and Benjamin Ellicott.

The Ellicott brothers helped revolutionize farming in the area by persuading farmers to plant wheat instead of tobacco and also by introducing fertilizer to revitalize depleted soil. Charles Carroll, a signer of the Declaration of Independence, was an early influential convert from tobacco to wheat. In 1770, Ellicott was elected to the American Philosophical Society. Nathaniel sold his partnership in 1777, Joseph sold all but his Hood's mill ownership the next year.

Ellicott died in 1780.
