= Joseph Ellicott =

American judge

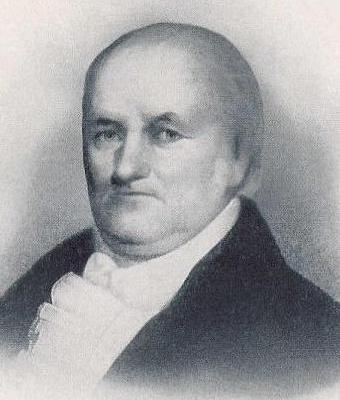
- Born: November 1, 1760; Bucks County, Pennsylvania, U.S.
- Died: August 19, 1826 (aged 65); New York City, New York, U.S.
- Occupations: Surveyor, city planner, land office agent, lawyer and politician
- Known for: Laying out Batavia and Buffalo; advocating Erie Canal
- Parent(s): Joseph Ellicott; Judith Blaker
- Relatives: Andrew Ellicott (brother); Benjamin Ellicott (brother)

Joseph Ellicott (November 1, 1760 in Bucks County, Pennsylvania – August 19, 1826 in New York City) was an American surveyor, city planner, land office agent, lawyer and politician of the Quaker faith.

== Life ==
Ellicott was born in Bucks County, Pennsylvania on November 1, 1760. He was the son of Quaker miller Joseph Ellicott (1732–1780) and Judith Blaker (1729–1809). Joseph's siblings included older brother Andrew Ellicott (1754–1820), a fellow surveyor, and younger brother Benjamin Ellicott (1765–1827), a U.S. Congressman. His nephew was U.S. congressman David Ellicott Evans.

== Career ==
In 1790, his brother Andrew Ellicott was hired by the federal government to survey the new federal district, where the new capital city of Washington was to be built. Joseph was Andrew's chief assistant during the latter part of the survey. Joseph Ellicott was subsequently sent to Georgia to survey the boundary line, established by treaty with the Creek tribe.

=== Holland Land Company ===
He was then engaged to survey some property in western Pennsylvania which had been purchased by a group of Dutch investors, who had formed the Holland Land Company. He also extended the New York - Pennsylvania border westward. When the company purchased a huge tract of western New York (that became known as The Holland Purchase), Ellicott was hired in 1797 and was sent to perform the monumental task of surveying it. Ellicott spent two years (1798–1800) living outdoors in summer and winter, laying out the townships of the new land in order to complete the Great Survey of the land in October 1800.

In 1800, the principal agent of the company, Paul Busti, gave him a new position as their agent at their Land Office in Batavia, New York. From this office, for the next 21 years he supervised the sales of the tract, with his personal signature on many deeds. Ellicott was an observer for the investors at the Big Tree Treaty when the Senecas sold their rights to the land in Western New York.

In 1801, he laid out Batavia, New York, and in 1804 the village of Buffalo, and established mill sites and communities.

He advocated a canal to be built from the Hudson River to Lake Erie, and was among the Erie Canal Commissioners appointed in 1816 to supervise the canal construction, but resigned in 1818 due to ill health. The Erie Canal was finished in 1825. He also arranged for the contribution of more than 100,000 acres (400 km^{2}) of company land to this project.

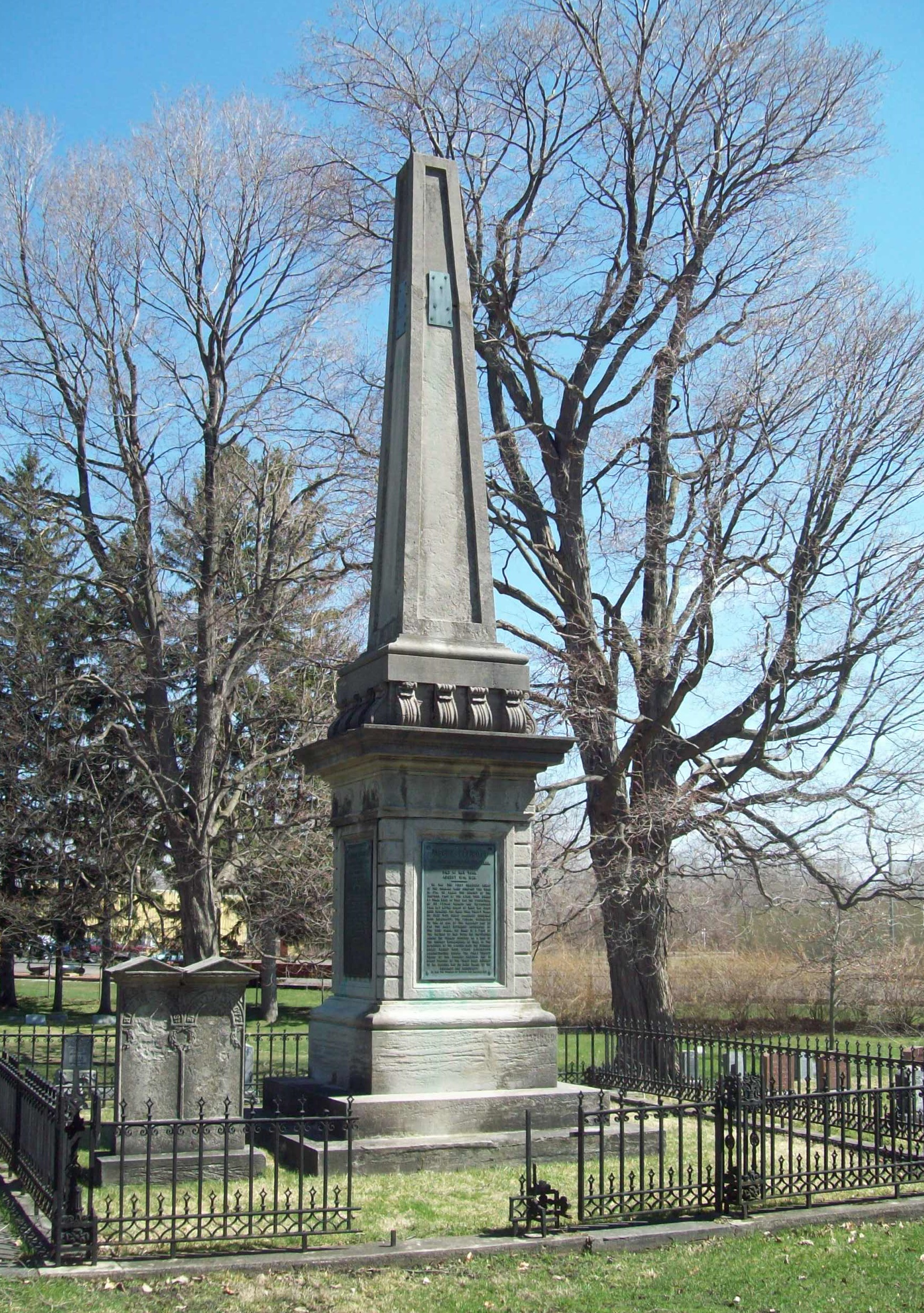
Joseph Ellicott Obelisk, Batavia Cemetery, April 2011

As seller and land agent, Ellicott offered generous terms to the buyers, some of whom purchased farms for as little as 25 cents down. When some buyers could not make payments he often extended the terms and sometimes forgave interest if they had made improvements. He offered some selected parcels free upon condition that the buyer would establish a mill or an inn, to help stimulate growth in the area. In later years, Ellicott became the target of complaints by citizens who were unhappy with the land company.

Ellicott was held responsible for the state of New York's decision not to buy up unsold land of the land company, and he retired in 1821. He then attempted to finance the purchase of the unsold land himself, but no one would join his venture, and he had to abandon the plan.

=== Politics ===
Ellicott was a presidential elector in 1804, voting for Thomas Jefferson and George Clinton. From March 1806 to June 1807, he was First Judge of the Genesee County Court.

== Personal life ==
Ellicott never married. His final years were marred by serious mental problems. Family members had him admitted to Bloomingdale Insane Asylum in New York City, where he died in 1826 by hanging himself. Soon after his burial in New York City, he was exhumed and re-buried in Batavia, New York at the Batavia Cemetery.

At his death left an estate valued at about $600,000 (equivalent to $17,074,000 in 2025).

== Legacy ==
Places named after Ellicott:

- Ellicottville, New York - village and town in Cattaraugus County, New York.
- Ellicott, New York - town in Chautauqua County, New York.
- Ellicott Square Building - an office building in Buffalo, New York, from which its owner Ellicott Development Co. also derives its name
- Ellicott Street - a street in downtown Buffalo, New York and another in downtown Batavia, New York.
- Ellicott Complex - a dormitory at the University at Buffalo.
- Ellicott Creek - a stream in Western New York.
- Ellicott Road - a road in Orchard Park, NY.
- Ellicott Elementary School - an elementary school in Orchard Park, NY
- Ellicott Run at Sinnemahoning State Park in Grove Township, Cameron County, Pennsylvania. He also laid out the Caledonia Pike in Cameron & Elk Counties, Pennsylvania.
- Ellicott Mall - A housing project in Buffalo, NY
- Ellicott Historic District - a local historic district in Buffalo, New York
