= Detroit Financial District =

Historic district in Michigan, United States

- U.S. National Register of Historic Places
- U.S. Historic district
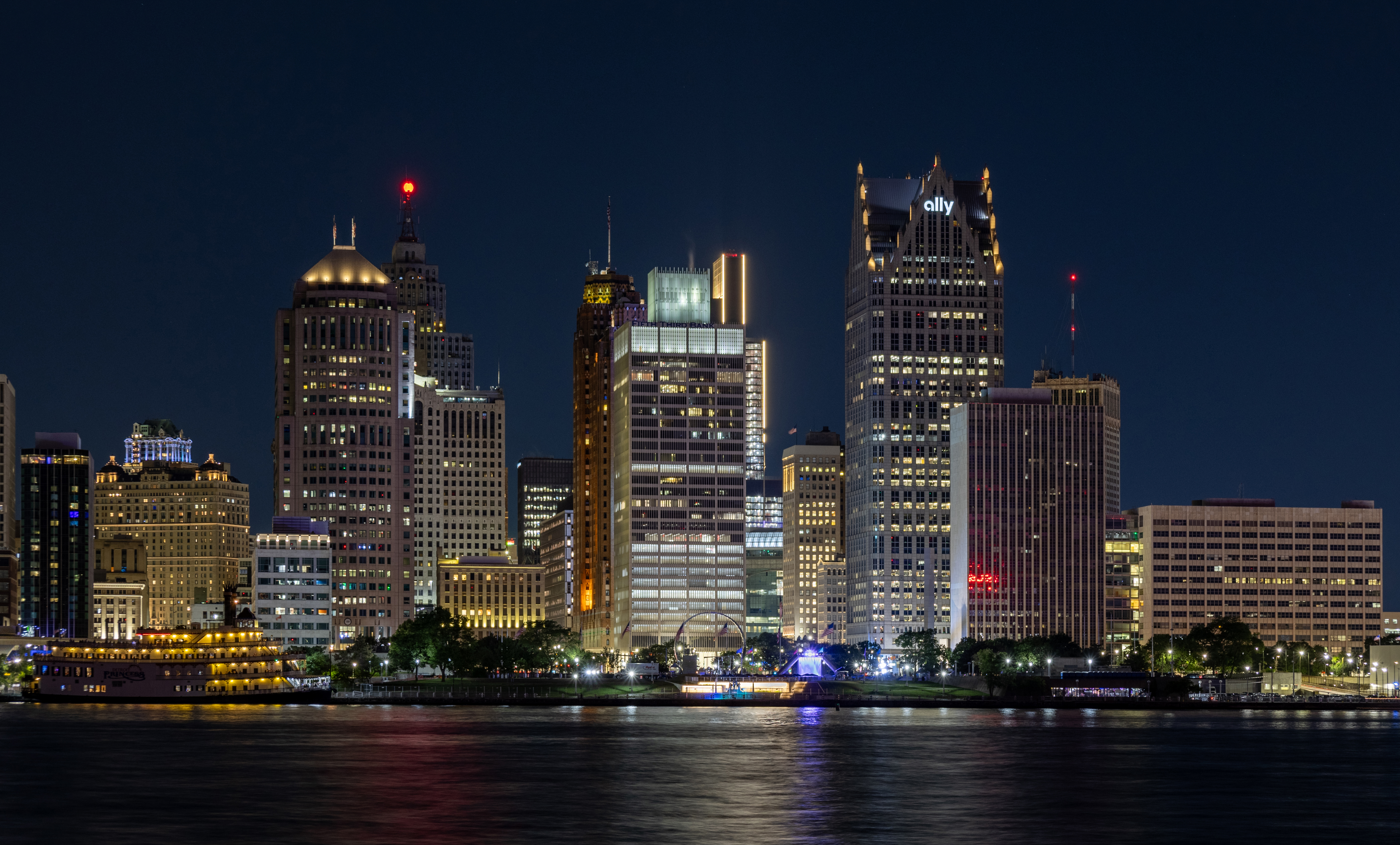
- Financial District along the International Riverfront viewed from Windsor, Ontario.
- Interactive map
- Location: Bounded by Woodward & Jefferson and Lafayette & Washington Blvd. Detroit, Michigan, U.S.
- Coordinates: 42°19′46.36″N 83°2′50.43″W
- Area: 27 acres (11 ha)
- NRHP reference No.: 09001067
- Added to NRHP: December 14, 2009

The Detroit Financial District is a United States historic district in downtown Detroit, Michigan. The district was listed on the U.S. National Register of Historic Places on December 14, 2009, and was announced as the featured listing in the National Park Service's weekly list of December 24, 2009.

It includes 33 buildings, two sites, and one other object that are deemed to be contributing to the historic character of the district, and also three non-contributing buildings.

The American Institute of Architects describes Detroit's Financial District as "one of the city's highest concentrations of quality commercial architecture". According to the National Park Service:

From the 1850s to the 1970s the Financial District in downtown Detroit was the financial and office heart of the city, and it stills retains an important banking and office presence today. Banks began to locate along Jefferson Avenue in the Griswold and Shelby streets area in the 1830s. Substantial office buildings, often containing banks in their street levels, began to line Griswold in the 1850s. Detroit's massive early twentieth-century auto industry-related growth and economic boom resulted in large-scale redevelopment of the area between 1900 and 1930, and another wave of development took place in the 1950s and early 1960s. The Financial District continues today to be an important financial and office district in Detroit.

In the new millennium, the 47-story Penobscot Building stands at the center of the district as a state of the art class-A office tower and serves as a hub for the city's wireless Internet zone and fiber-optic communication network. Other major class-A office renovations include the Chrysler House and the Guardian Building, a National Historic Landmark. The Financial District is served by the Detroit People Mover and QLine light rail. Viewed from the International Riverfront, the district is bordered on the left by the 150 West Jefferson skyscraper which replaced the Detroit Stock Exchange Building and on the right by the One Woodward Avenue skyscraper.

== History ==
=== Old Detroit: Before 1830 ===
What is now the Detroit Financial District was the site of the construction of the first building in Detroit, Ste. Anne's Catholic Church, constructed in 1701 by Antoine de la Mothe Cadillac. Ste. Anne's stood at the southern edge of the district, just west of the corner of Jefferson Avenue and Griswold Streets, where the Standard Savings & Loan Building is today. A stockade, later known as Fort Detroit, was constructed around the church and southward. Portions of the fort, as well as the church and other buildings, were destroyed and rebuilt multiple times during the next few decades. By the time the fort was surrendered to British forces in 1760, it encompassed an area stretching from the present Griswold Street to west of Shelby Street, and from south or Larned Street to a block south of Jefferson Avenue. In the 1770s the fort was again extended, encompassing the entire area from the Detroit River to Larned Street, and from Griswold Street west to Cass Avenue.

In 1778, the British military commander decided that Fort Detroit was too difficult to defend, and construction on a second fort to the north began. This fort, known as Fort Lernoult (later Fort Shelby), was centered in the northern section of what is now the Detroit Financial District, covering the area between Fort Street and Lafayette Street, and from Griswold street west to Washington Avenue. The southern stockade was extended from the river to the new fort, enclosing nearly all the Financial District.

However, the land north of what now is Larned Street was low and marshy, and most buildings were located south of that line. In 1805, a devastating fire swept through the village of Detroit, destroying all but one structure. After the fire, Detroit was replatted, establishing the main avenues of Jefferson and Woodward. Some residents were awarded lots south of Fort Shelby and north of Jefferson in what is now financial district, and built homes there. Fort Shelby was controlled by the British until 1813, when it was abandoned and taken over by American forces. However, Fort Shelby had been deteriorating, and in 1824, the federal government ceded the southern section of the grounds to the city. In 1826, troops left the fort, and the remainder of the fort and grounds were given to the city; the next year Fort Shelby was demolished and streets platted in the pattern that remains today. In addition, the marshy section north of Larned was drained by rerouting and deepening the River Savoyard.

Early images of the Financial District

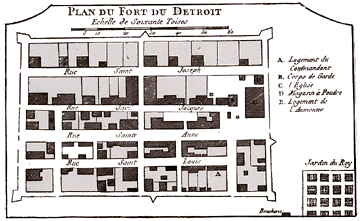
Fort Detroit in 1763. Note eglise in northeast section.

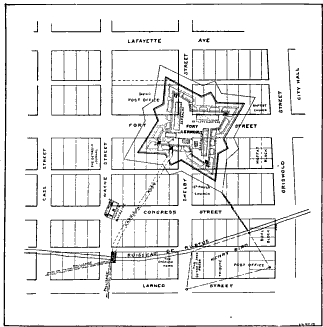
Fort Shelby shown on streetmap of Financial District

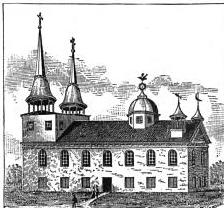
Ste Anne's, constructed 1818

=== Early settlement: 1830 to 1860 ===
Beginning in the 1830s, the financial institutions of Detroit began to locate along West Jefferson, on the southern edge of what is now the Financial District, while the remainder of the district developed into a primarily residential area as the streets in the area were slowly opened and graded. The first bank located along west Jefferson was the Bank of Michigan, which built its headquarters on the south side of Jefferson near Woodward in 1831, and five years later built another structure at Jefferson and Griswold (just south of the area that is now the Financial District). The 1830s and 40s brought more banks along Jefferson near Griswold, including the Farmer's and Mechanic's Bank (1832), National Insurance Bank (1838), Michigan State Bank (1837), the Bank of St. Clair (1842), and the Peninsular Bank (1849).

Other commercial establishments, including the offices of the Detroit Free Press, occupied the area along Jefferson near Griswold and the lots immediately north thereof. By the 1850s, commercial and banking interests had pushed northward to line the first few blocks of Griswold. In 1858, a Federal Building was constructed on the corner of Griswold and Larned, spurring the construction of substantial office buildings in the surrounding area along Griswold.

Buildings in the Financial District constructed early and mid- 19th century

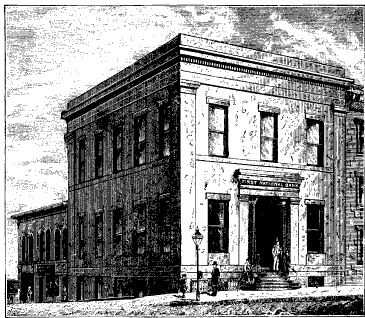
Bank of Michigan Building, SW corner of Jefferson and Griswold, built 1836

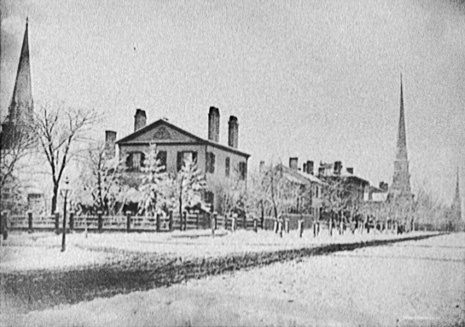
SW Corner of Griswold and Fort Streets (current location of the Greater Penobscot Building), c. 1870. The house in the foreground was constructed for John Palmer in 1829 and demolished in 1869

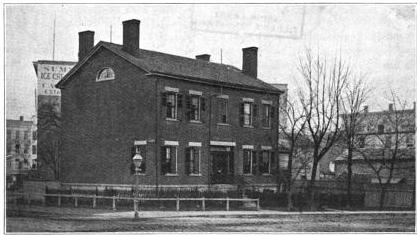
Abbot Homestead on the SE corner of Griswold and Fort, built 1835 and demolished in 1881.

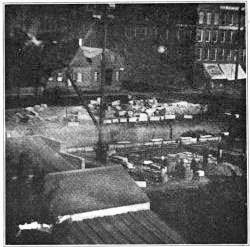
Excavation for the construction of the Federal Building. This image, taken in 1857, is one of the oldest known Detroit photographs.

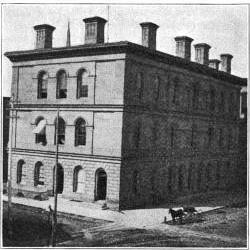
Federal Building (1858) on the corner of Griswold and Larned Streets.

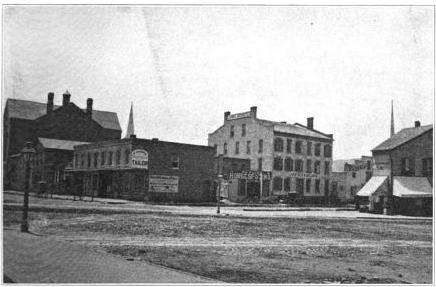
Commercial buildings on the SW corner of Griswold and Lafayette, photographed in 1873.

=== Rise of commercialism: 1860 to 1900 ===
Many of the office buildings constructed near the 1858 Federal Building housed at least one bank on the first floor, and by 1884, historian Silas Farmer called Griswold "the Wall Street of Detroit". In 1899, 22 of the 23 banks in Detroit were located in what is now the Financial District—20 of them on Griswold alone.

Commercial and banking buildings spread north and west from the Griswold area. Fort Street east of Shelby had turned commercial by the 1870s; the section of Fort Street west of Shelby remained residential until the 1890s when a new Federal Building was constructed in the area.

Buildings in the Financial District, c. 1890

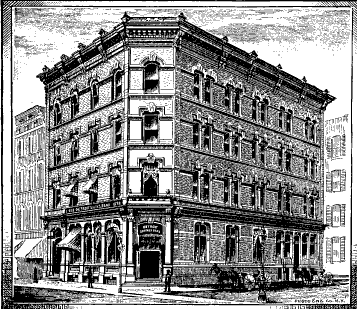
Detroit Savings Bank, 1878, NE corner of Griswold and Larned Designed by Gordon W Lloyd.

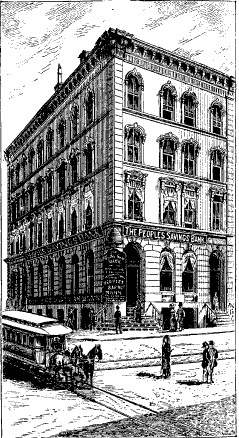
People's Savings Bank, 1872, SE Corner of Griswold and Congress

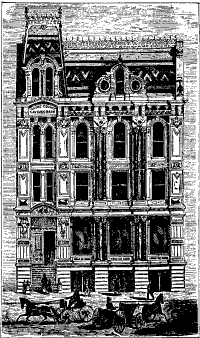
Wayne County Savings Bank, 1876, North side of Congress west of Griswold

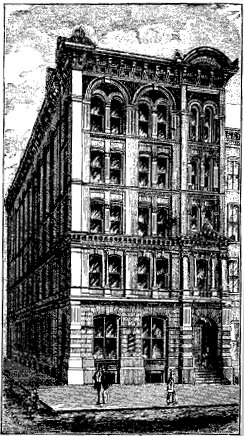
State Savings Bank, 1884, West side of Griswold south of Congress

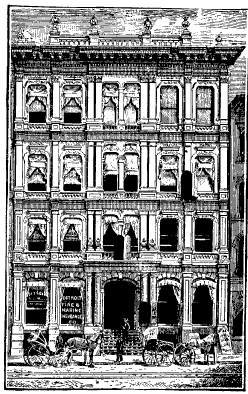
Detroit Fire And Marine Insurance, 1874, East side of Griswold south of Congress

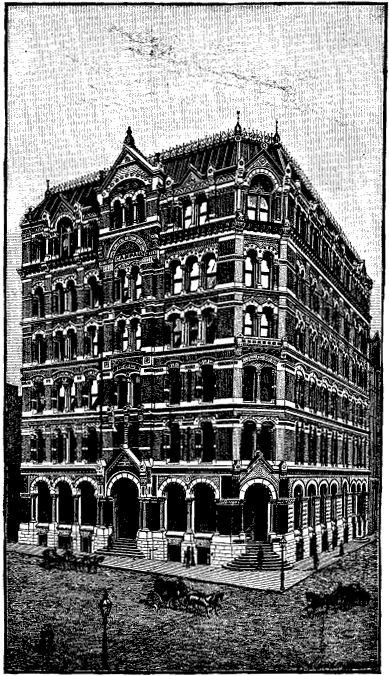
Campau Block, 1883, SW corner of Griswold and Larned. Designed by Mortimer L Smith

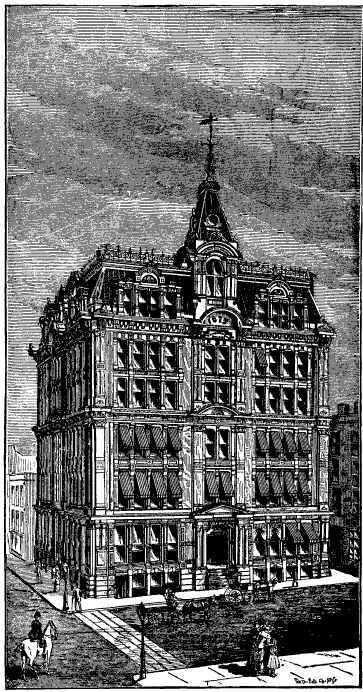
Newberry And McMillan Building, 1879, SE corner of Griswold and Larned. Designed by Gordon W Lloyd.

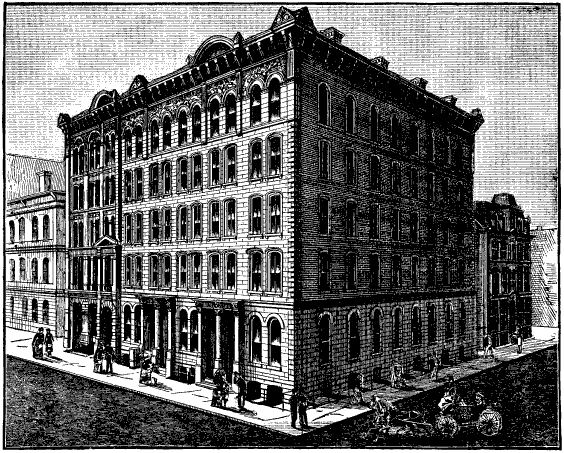
Buhl Block, 1868, corner of Griswold and Congress

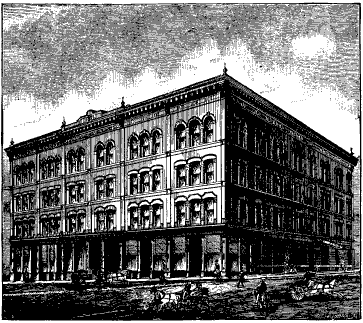
Moffat Building, 1871, SW corner of Fort and Griswold. Designed by Henry T Brush

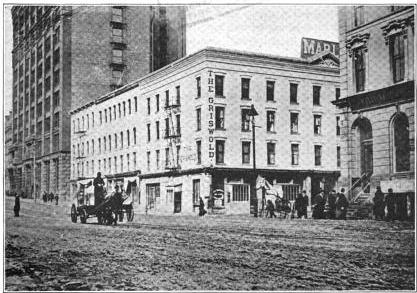
Union Trust Building on Woodward, taken c. 1890. The Hammond Building is on the left.

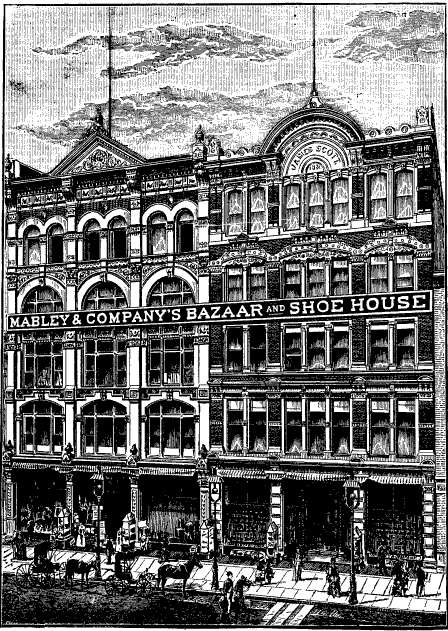
C. R. Mabley & Co Building, 1881, west side of Woodward between Fort and Congress.

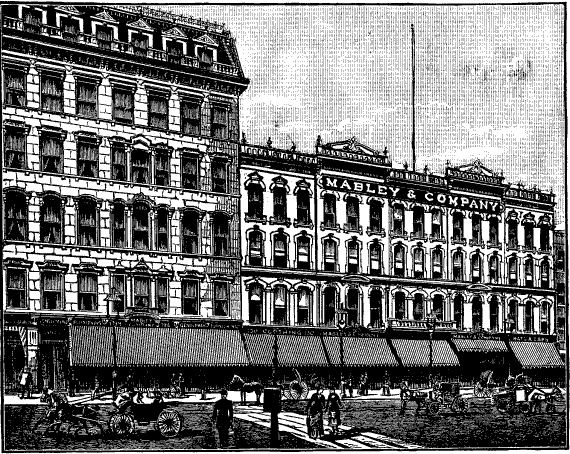
C. R. Mabley & Co Building, 1876, east side of Woodward. The structures on the right still exist and are part of the Financial District.

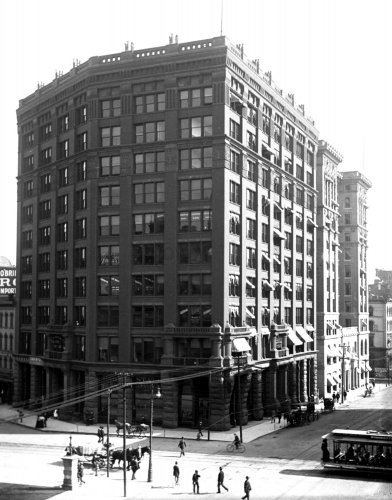
Hammond Building, 1889, was the first skycreaper in Detroit

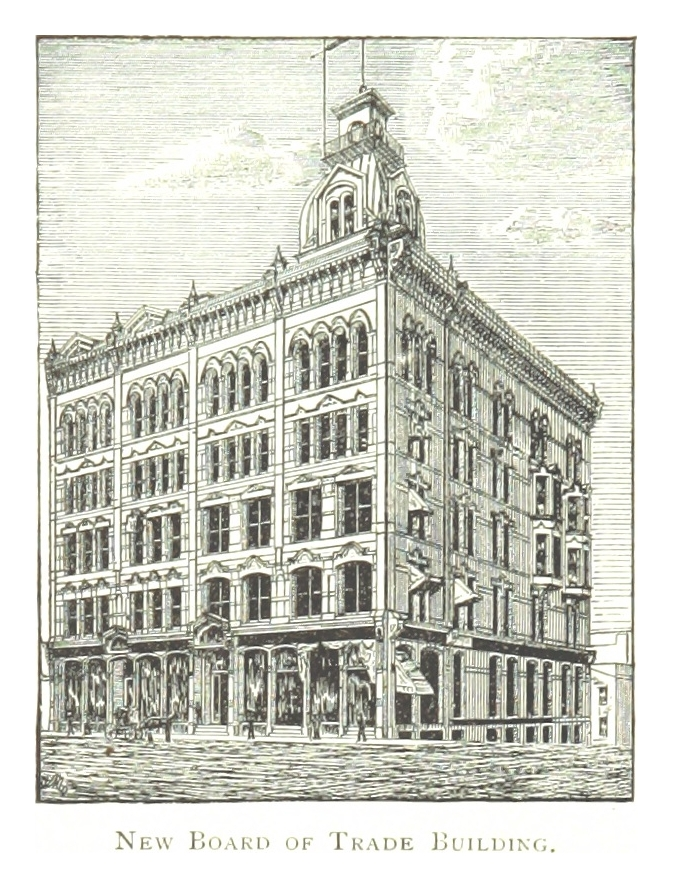
Board of Trade building, 1880, SE Corner of Jefferson and Griswold. Designed by Gordon W Lloyd

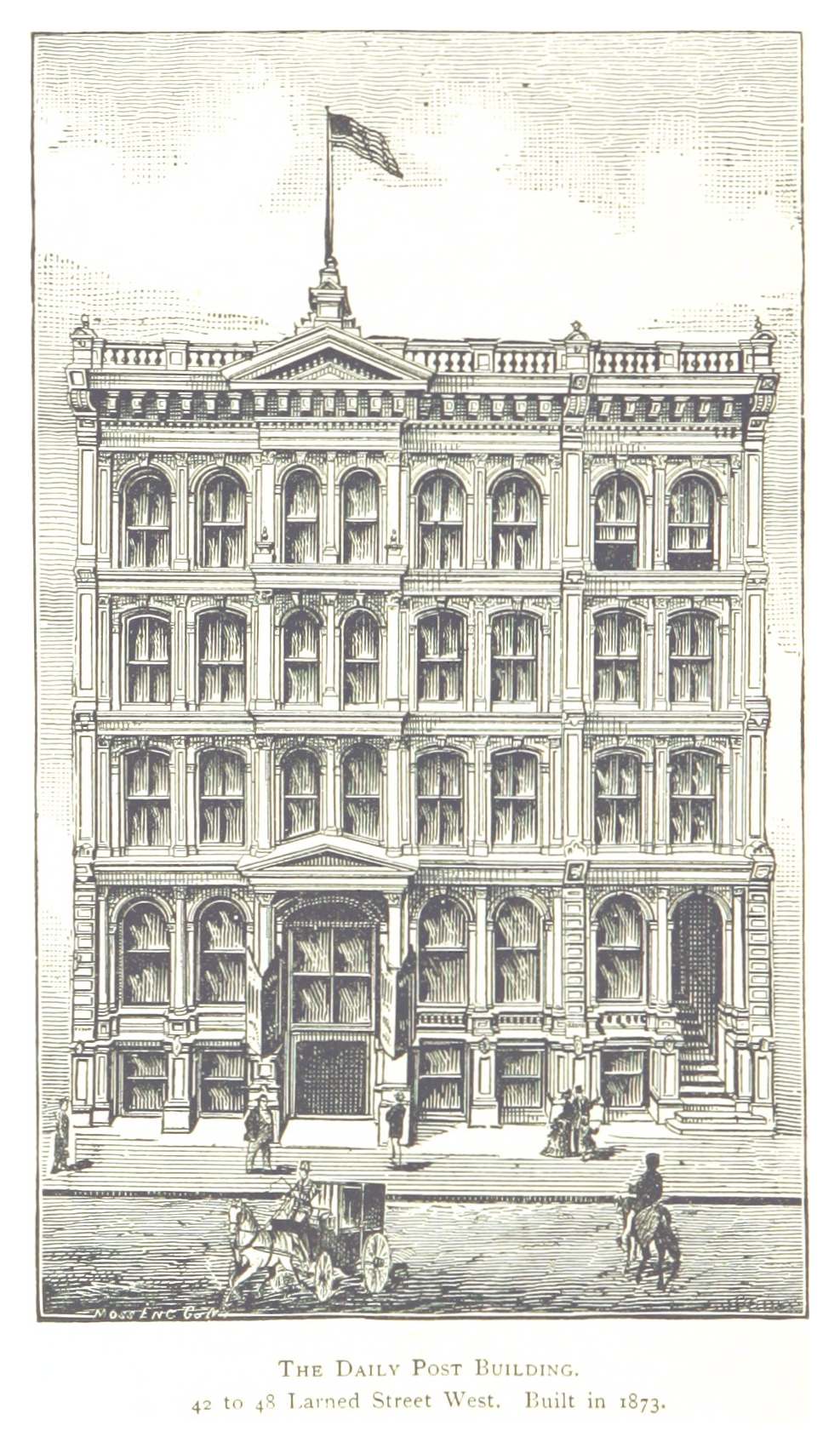
Daily Post Building, 1873, North side of Larned between Griswold and Shelby.

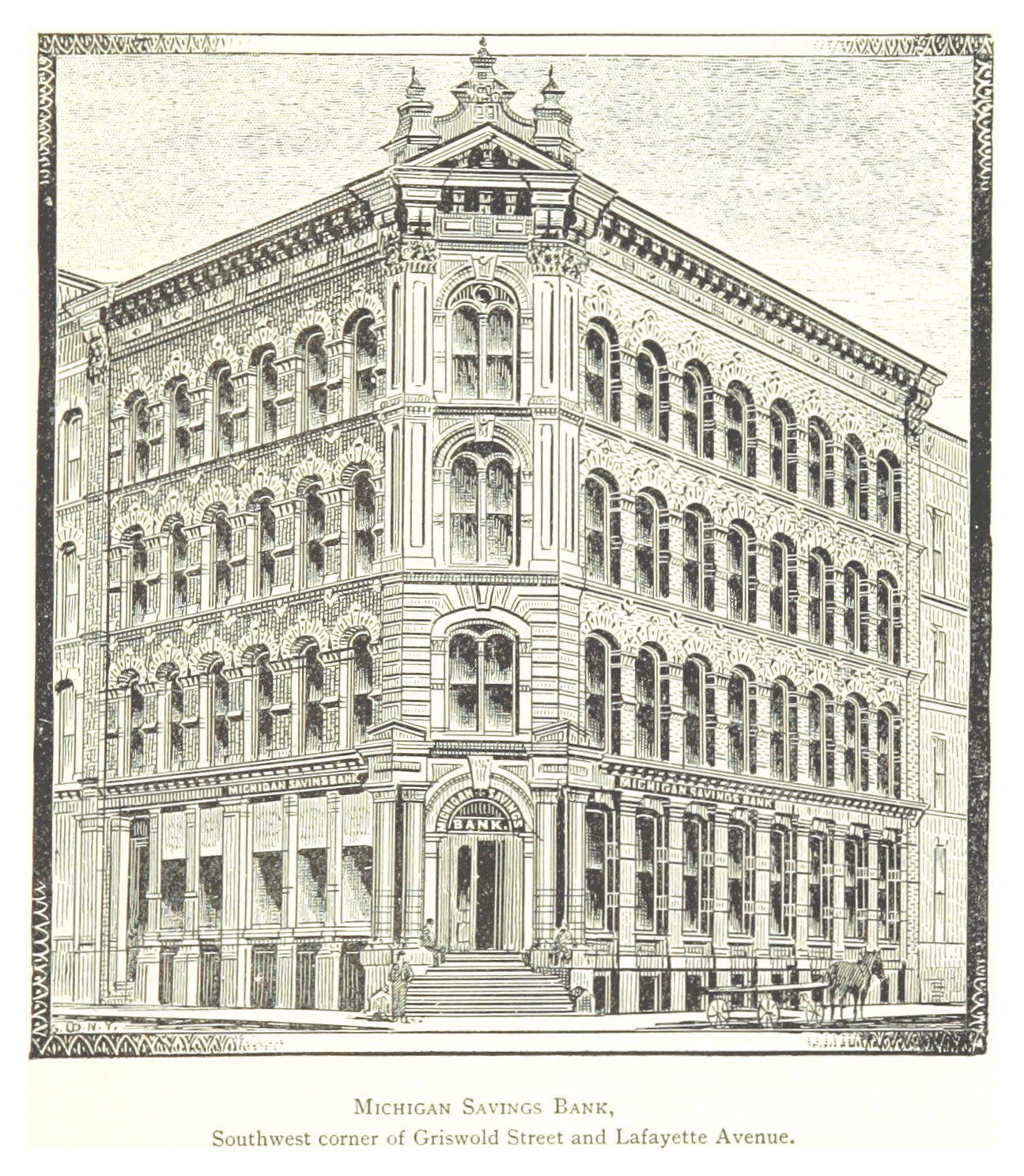
Michigan Savings Bank Building, 1874, SW Corner of Griswold and Lafayette.

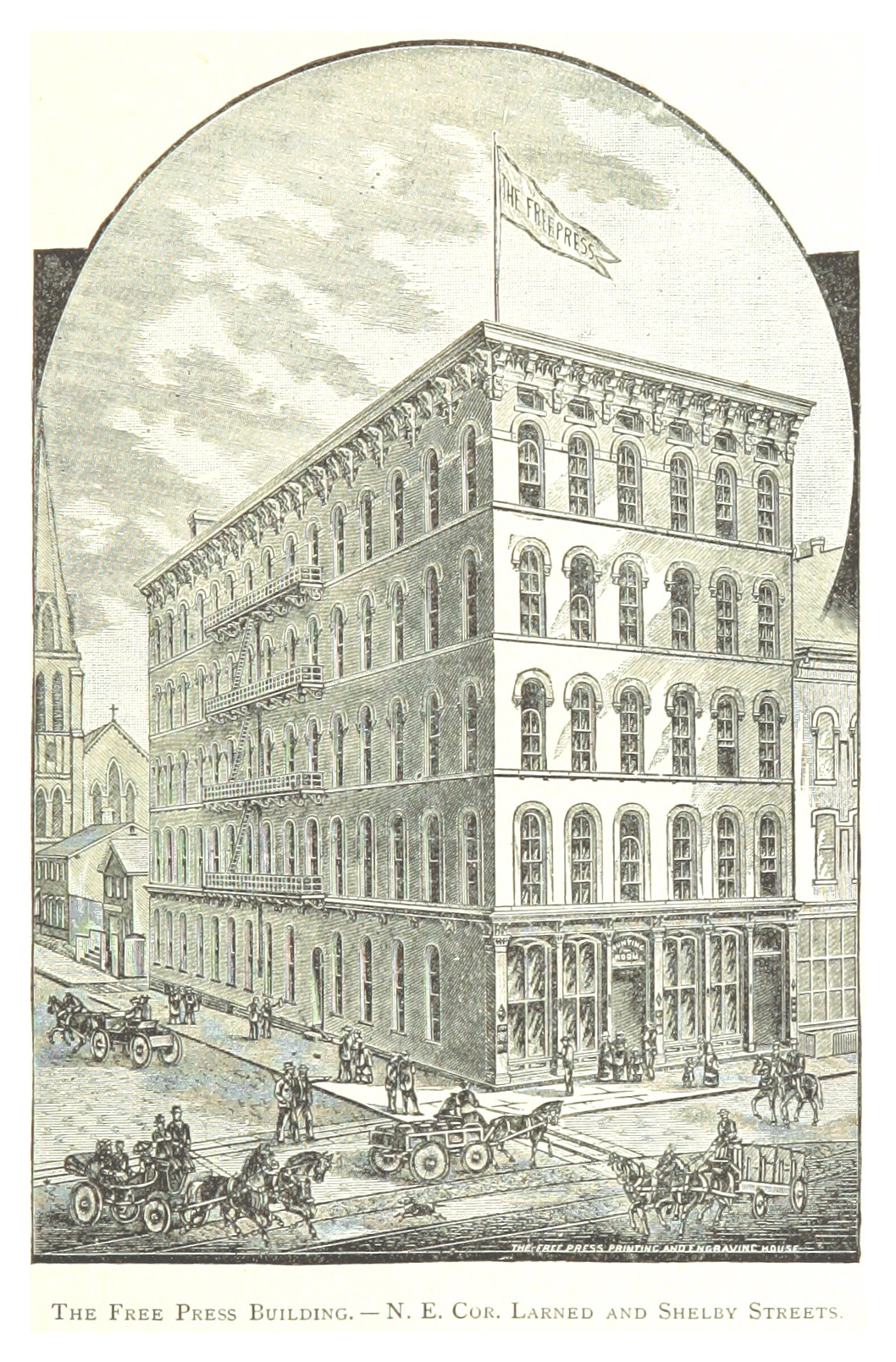
Detroit Free Press Building, 1866, NE Corner of Larner and Shelby.

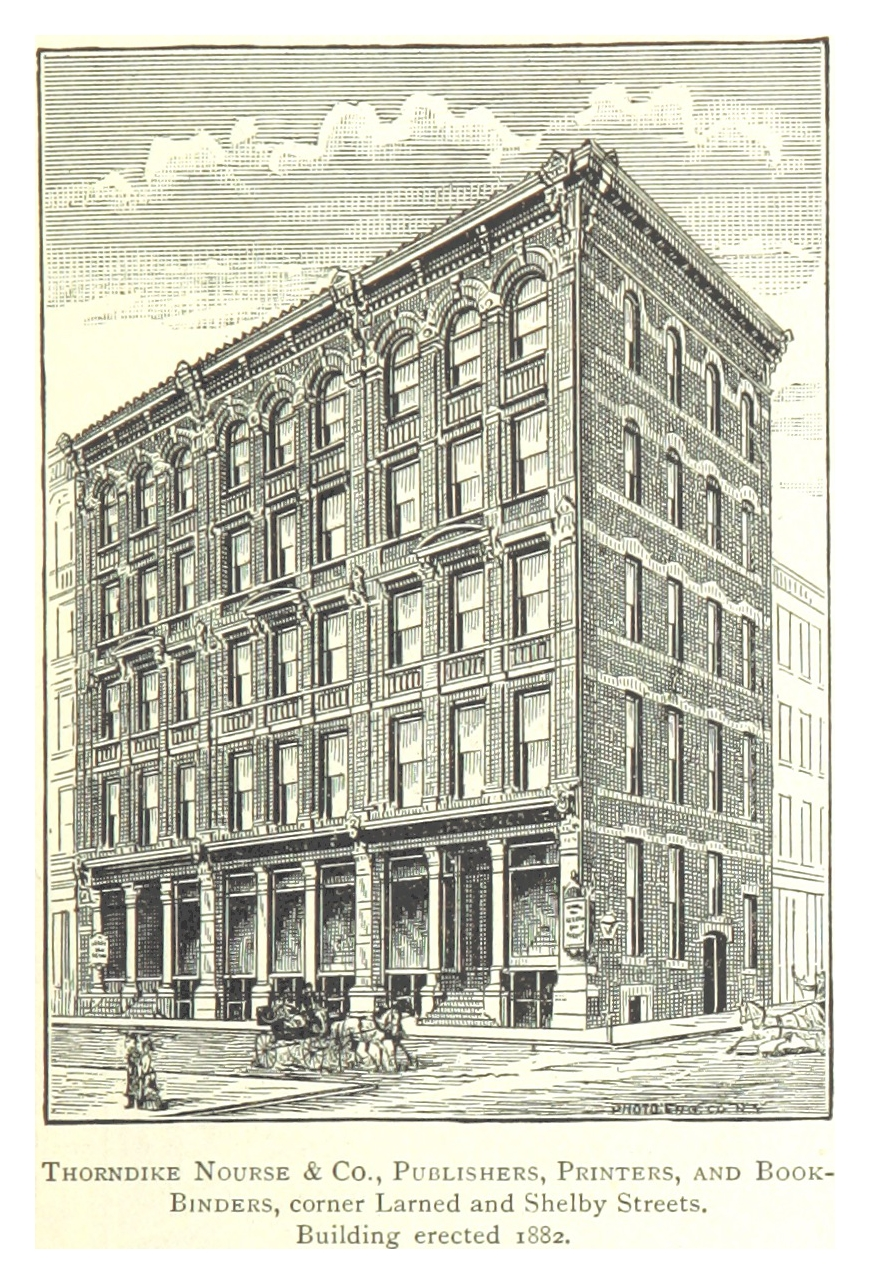
Thorndike Nurse & Company Building, 1882, SE Corner of Larner and Shelby.

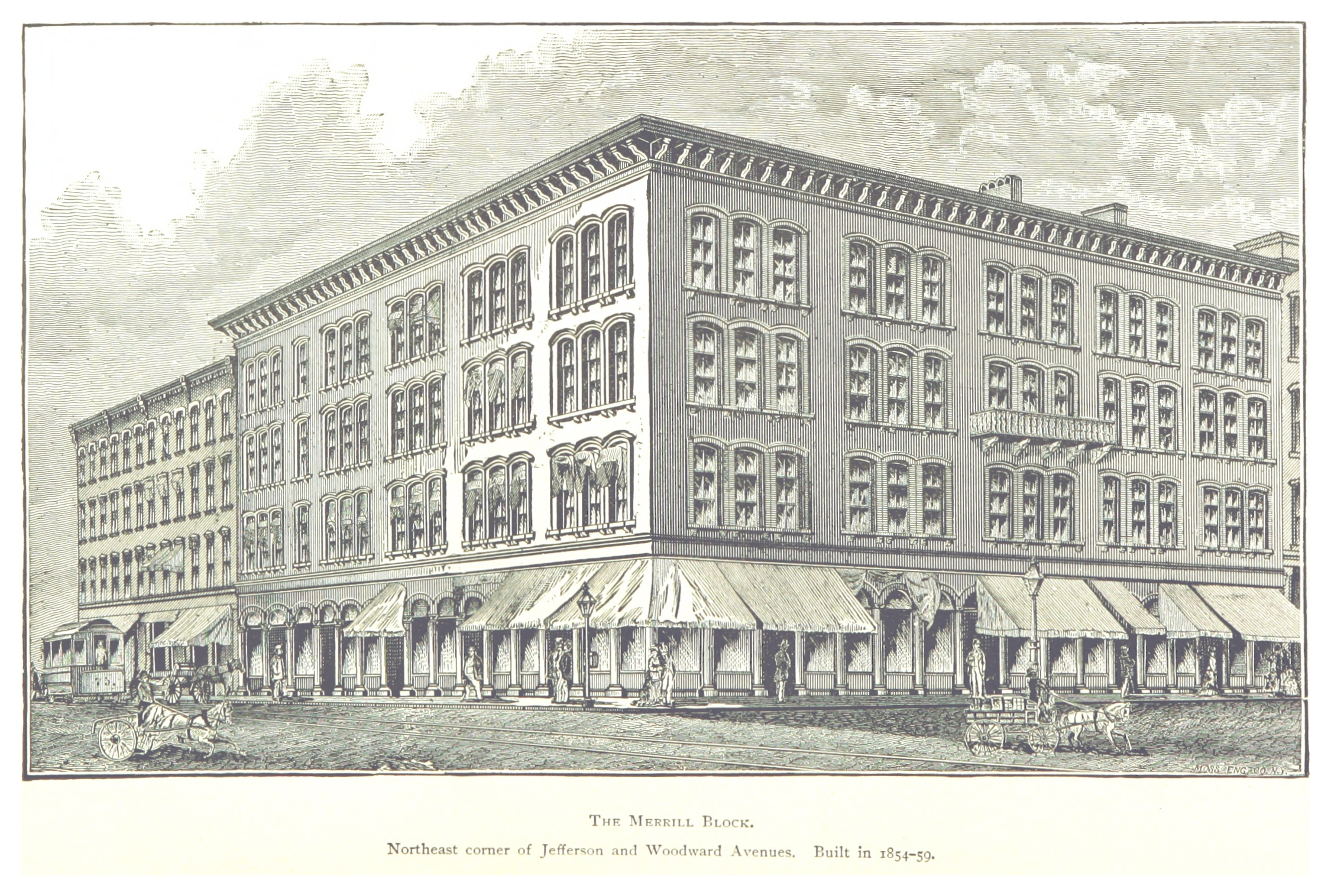
Merrill Block, 1859, NE Corner of Jefferson and Woodward.

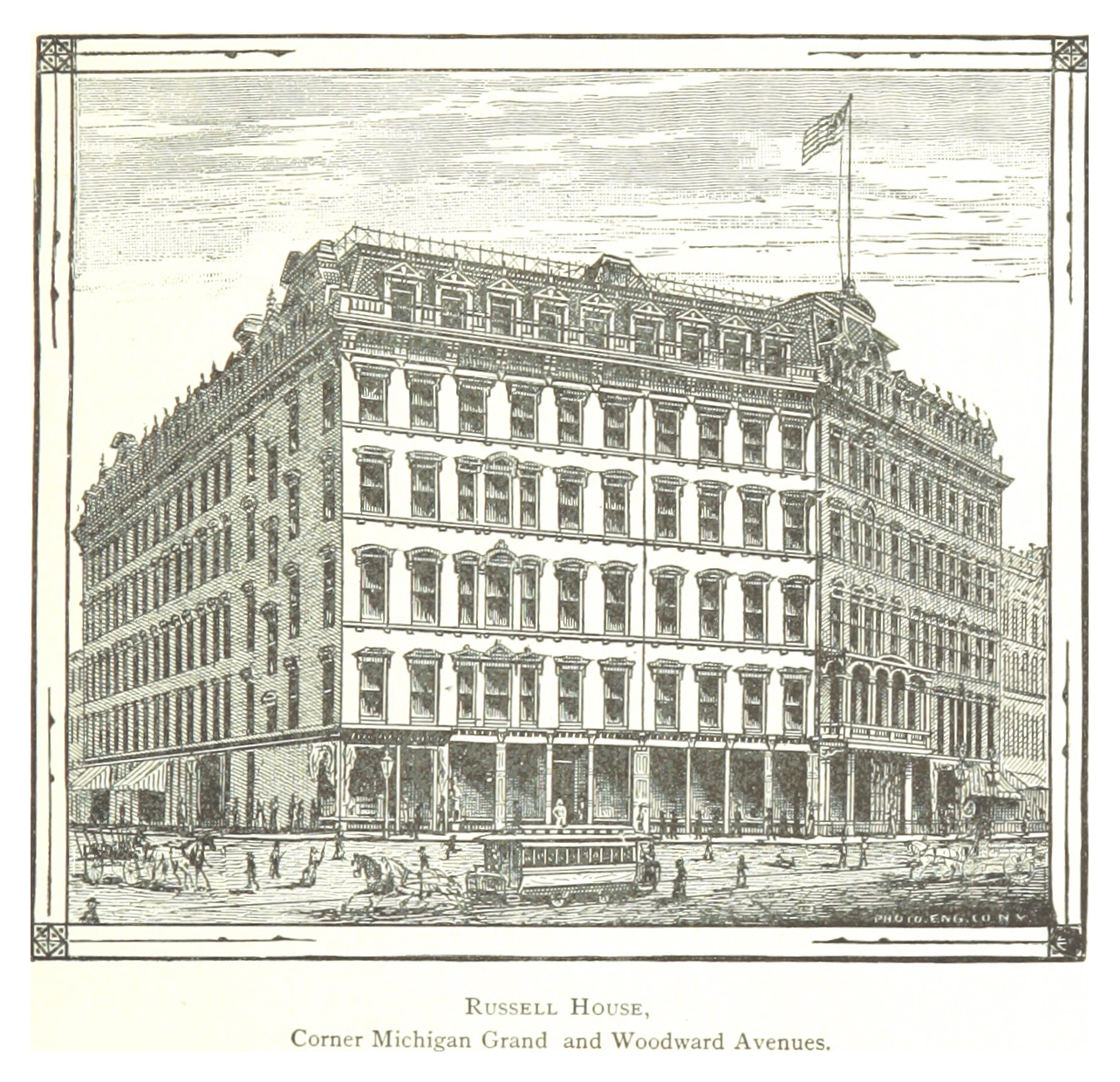
Russell House, 1850, in the site of First National Bank Building.

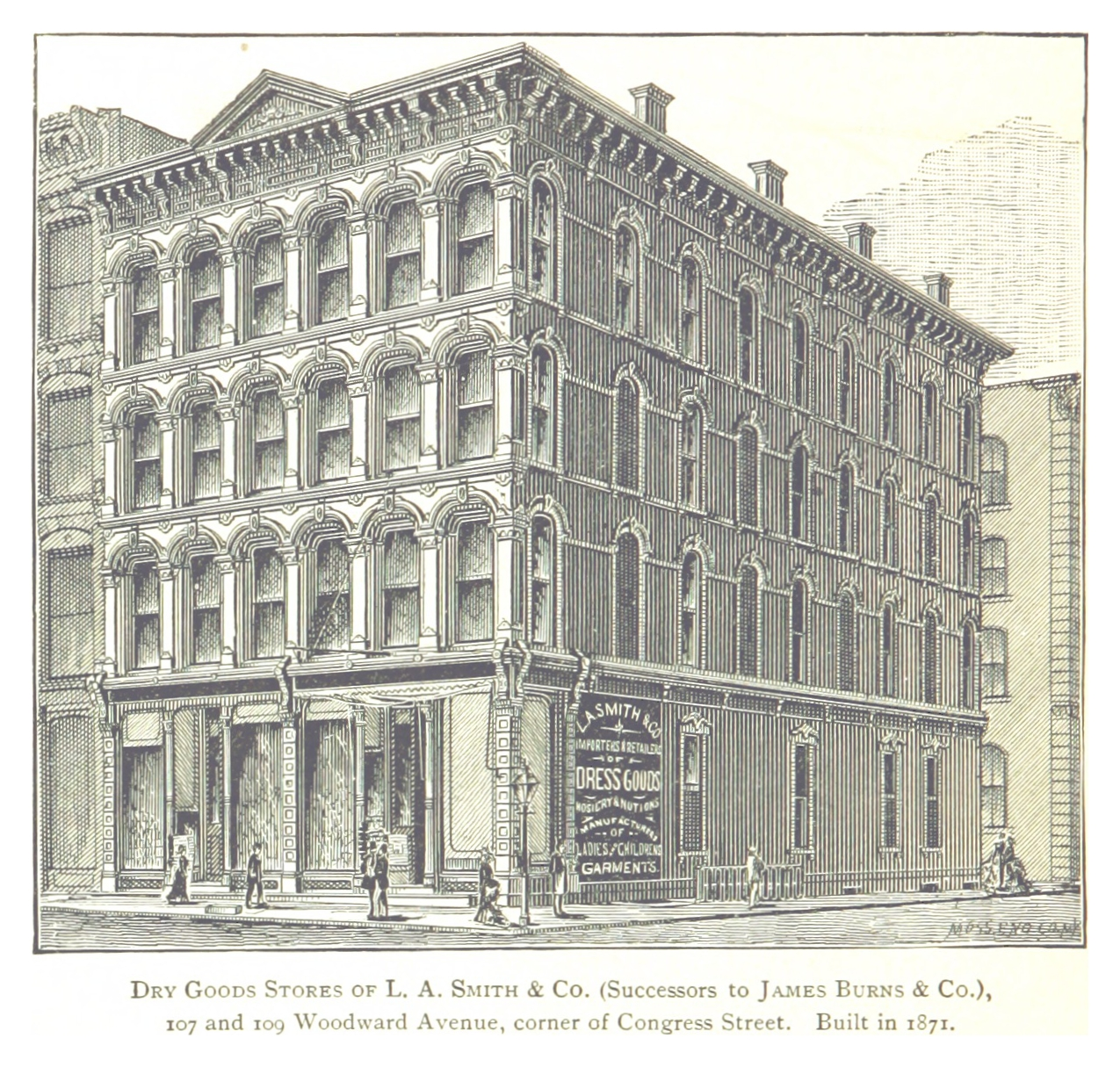
L.A Smith Building, 1871, NW Corner of Woodward and Congress.

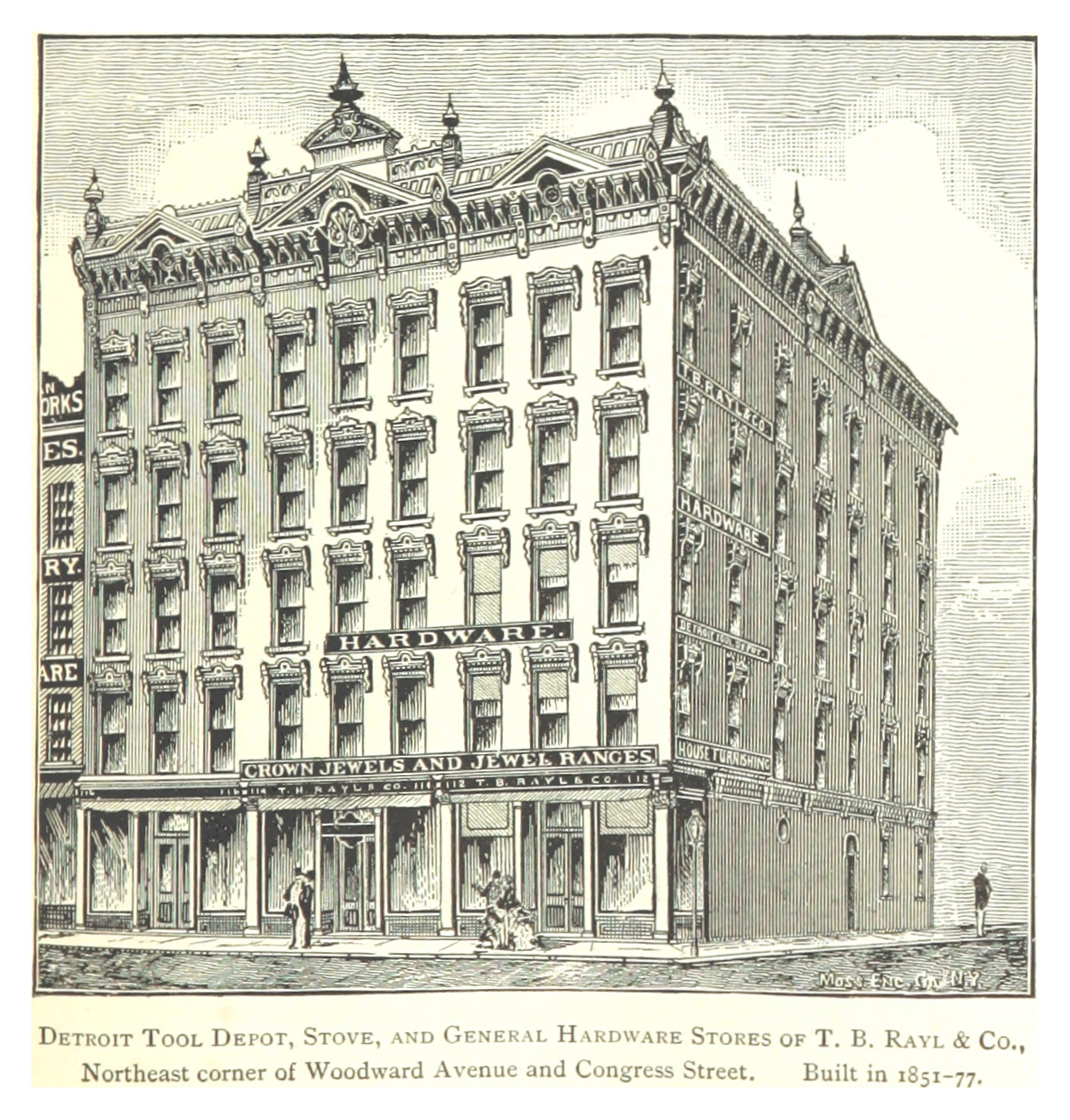
Detroit Tool Depot, 1851, (renovated in 1877) NE Corner of Woodward and Congress, part of this building is still standing today.

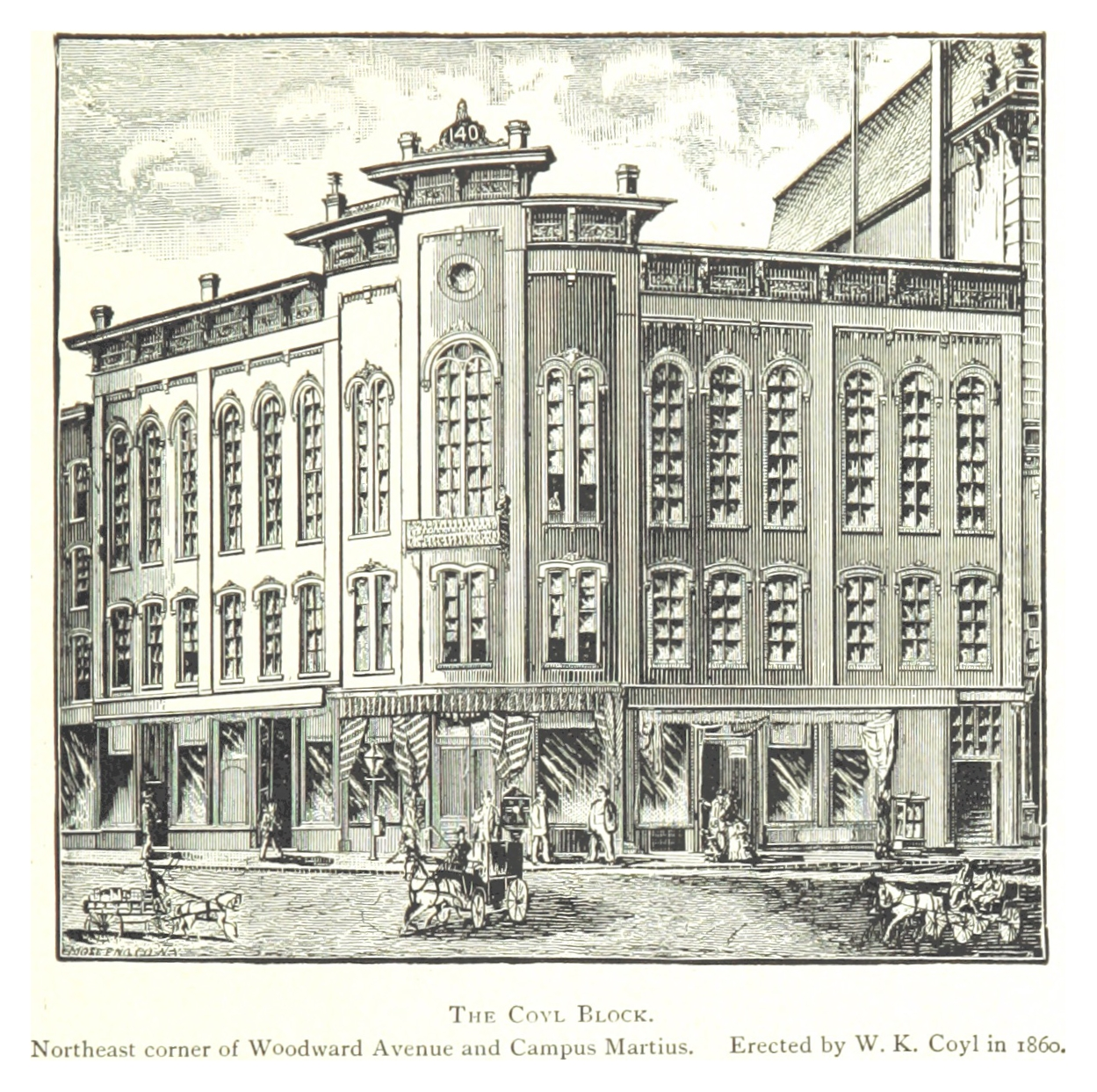
Coyl Block, 1860, NE Corner of Woodward and Monroe.

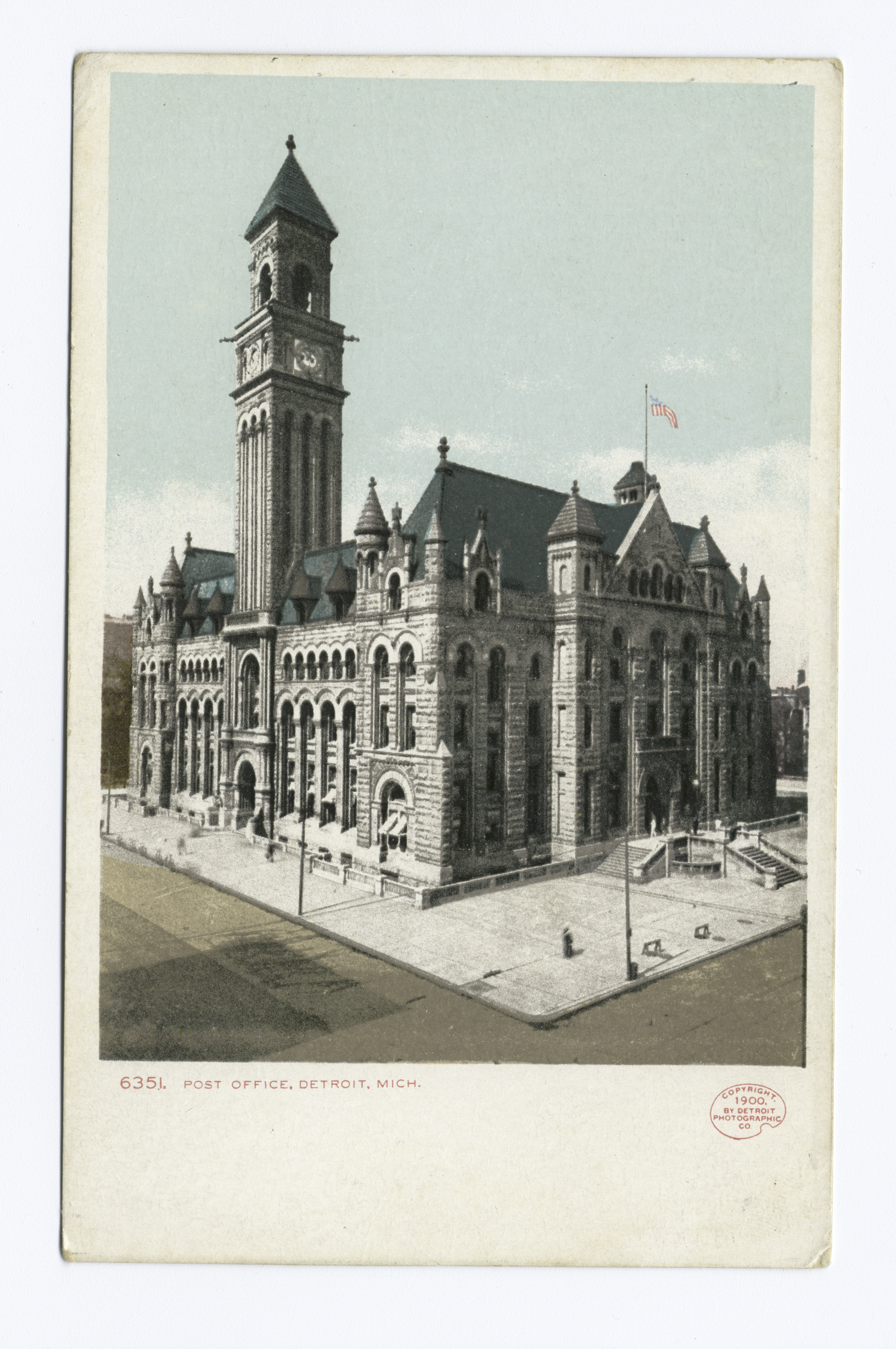
Old Post Office, 1897, in the site of the Federal Building

=== Modern Detroit: After 1900 ===
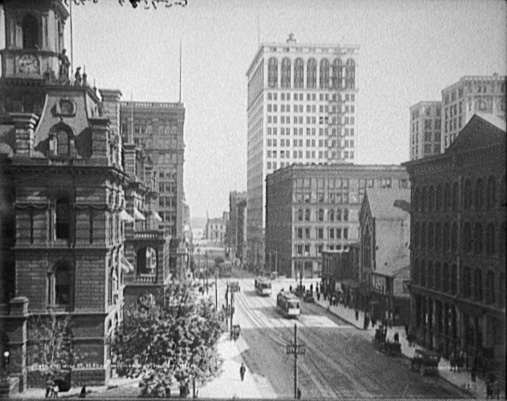
Griswold looking south from Michigan Avenue, c. 1910. Note the Ford Building in center and the top of the original Penobscot Building at right.

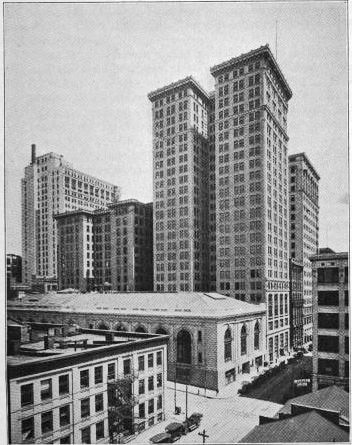
Dime, Penobscot, and Ford Buildings, with the State Savings Bank in center foreground, c. 1922.

The Financial District underwent a dramatic transformation at the beginning of the twentieth century, heralded by the arrival of Detroit's first skyscraper, the Hammond Building in 1889; Chase Tower now stands on this site. In 1905, the thirteen-story original Penobscot Building was constructed on Fort Street, followed by the nearby eighteen-story Ford Building in 1907 and the 23-story Dime Building in 1913. In the 1920s, even larger skyscrapers invaded, culminating in the 40-story Guardian Building and 48-story Greater Penobscot Building, both built in 1927–29. When completed in 1928, the Penobscot became the world's eighth-tallest building and the tallest outside of New York and Chicago. It was the city's tallest from 1928 to 1977. The Penobscot stands at the center of the Detroit Financial District.

The Great Depression halted the construction of buildings in the Financial District, and substantial new construction wasn't undertaken again until the late 1940s with the construction of the annex to the Federal Reserve Bank of Chicago Detroit Branch Building. This was followed in 1959 by a new National Bank of Detroit Building, and in the early 1960s by the Michigan Consolidated Gas Company Building and the Detroit Bank and Trust Tower.

== Financial District ==
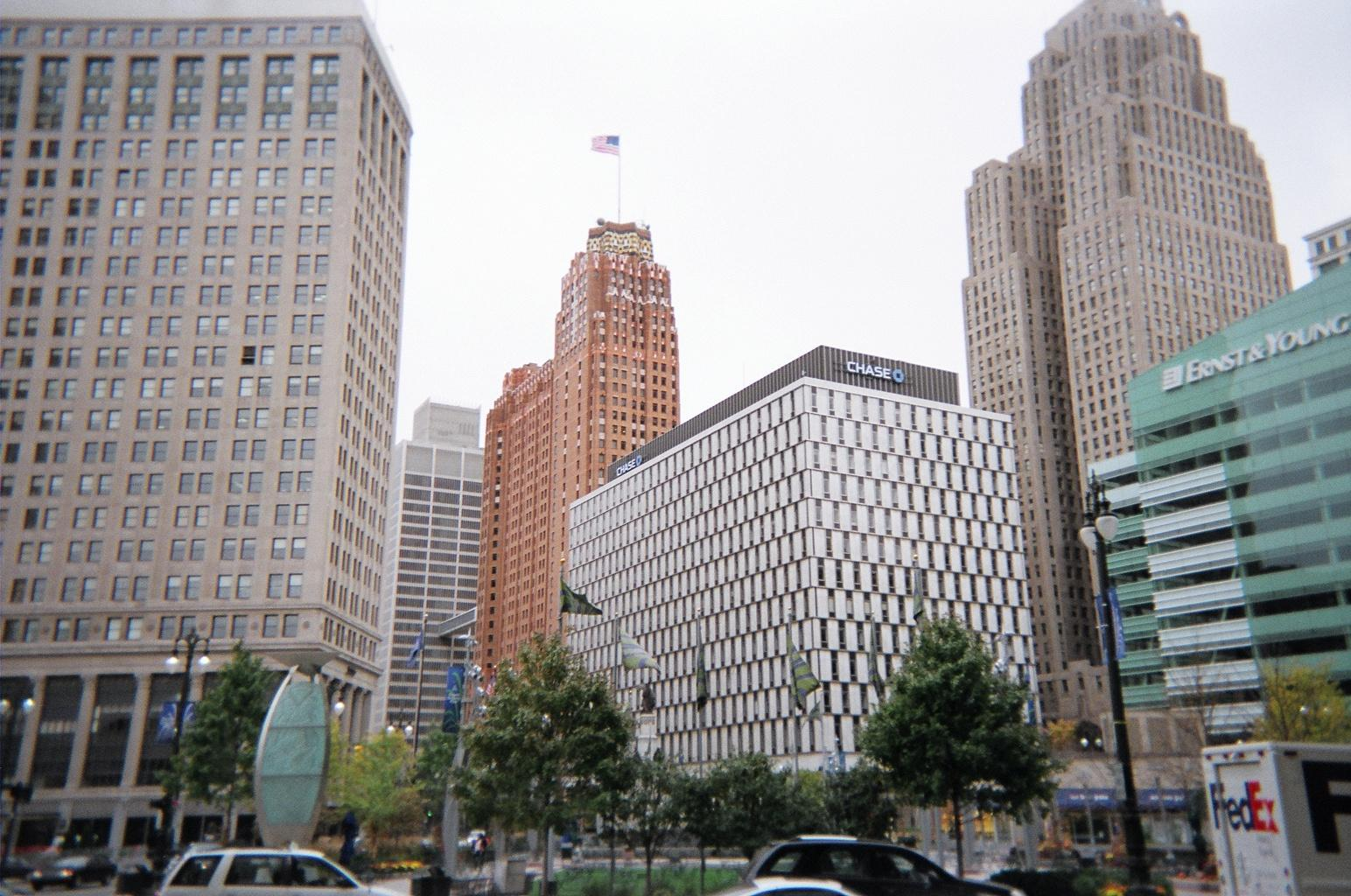
View from Campus Martius Park up Woodward Ave., left to right: The First National Building, One Woodward Avenue, the Guardian, The Qube, Greater Penobscot Building, and One Kennedy Square across from the District.

There are 36 buildings within the Financial District, 33 of which are contributing properties. The buildings within the district were designed by a suite of notable architects and architectural firms, including D. H. Burnham & Company; Donaldson and Meier; Albert Kahn Associates; McKim, Mead, and White; Smith, Hinchman, and Grylls (and Wirt C. Rowland); and Minoru Yamasaki. The Financial District is flanked by other skyscrapers in Downtown Detroit, including One Detroit Center and the Renaissance Center skyscrapers.

Four of the contributing properties in this district were previously individually listed on the National Register. These include the Union Trust (or Guardian) Building, an Art Deco–style building and a U.S. National Historic Landmark, the State Savings Bank Building, the Federal Reserve Bank of Chicago Detroit Branch Building, and the Vinton Building. Other significant properties in the district include the 1927 Greater Penobscot Building, tallest in the district at 47 stories, the 1959 International Style National Bank of Detroit Building, the 1920 First National Building, the 1925 Buhl Building, the 1909 Ford Building, the 1912 Chrysler House, and the 1925 Detroit Free Press Building.

Eighteen of these buildings initially housed banks or financial institutions; many of the remainder were used for office space.

The buildings below are listed in rough geographic order beginning from the southeast corner of the district (the intersection of Woodward and Jefferson) and proceeding northwest.

=== One Woodward Avenue (1962) ===
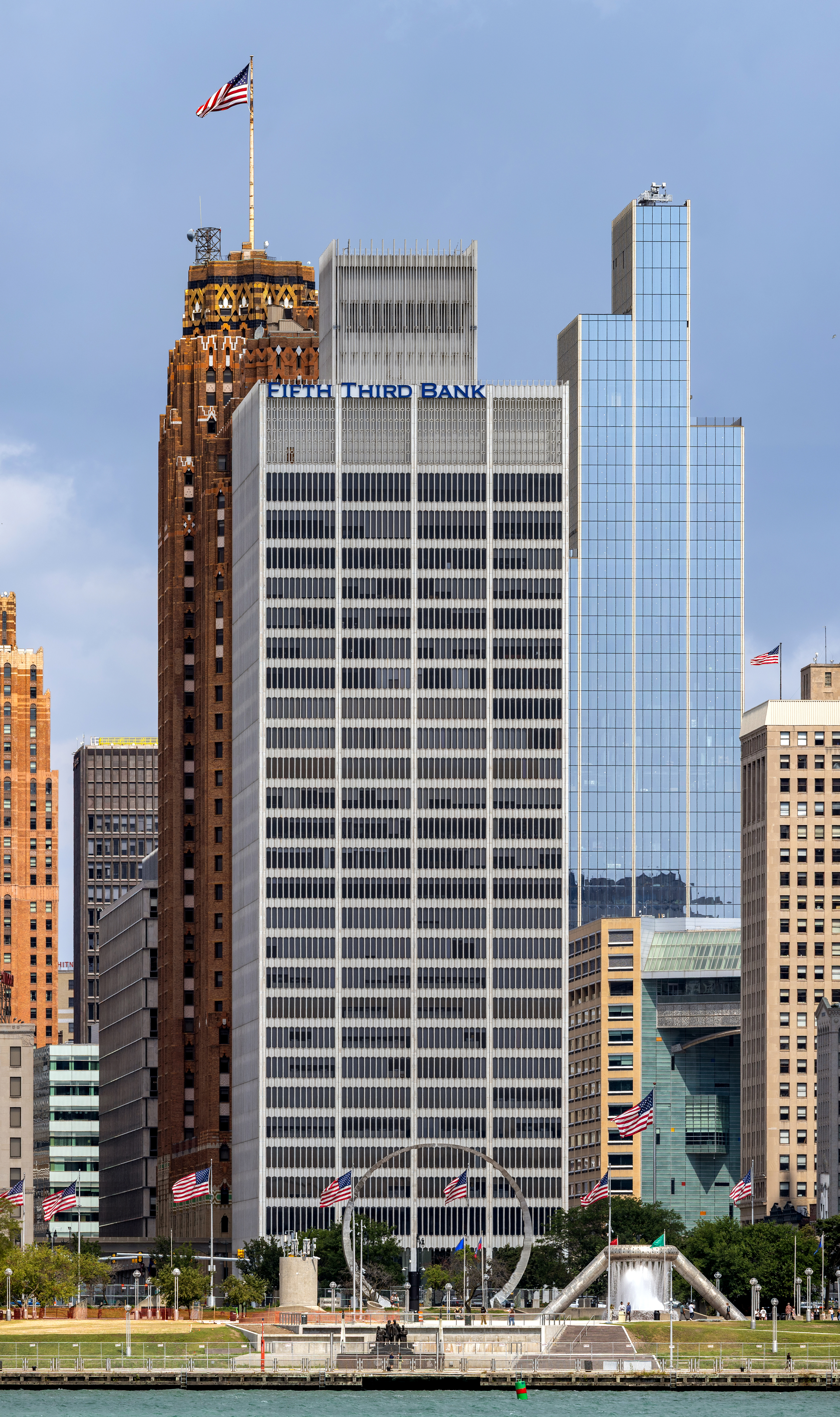

42°19′44″N 83°2′44″W

The One Woodward Avenue Building (Michigan Consolidated Gas Company Building) is a 32-story, flat-roofed skyscraper with a steel frame. It was built in 1960–62, and designed by Minoru Yamasaki and Smith, Hinchman, and Grylls; the building was apparently a model for Yamasaki's later work of the World Trade Center in New York. The building rests on a platform, approached via entrance staircases, with a reflecting pool and tall glass-enclosed lobby emphasizing the airy lightness. White concrete panels hold the hexagonal windows in place. The three-story glass panels were the tallest ever installed at the time.

The bronze ballerina in front of the building is by Giacomo Manzù.

=== Standard Savings & Loan Building (One Griswold) (1927) ===
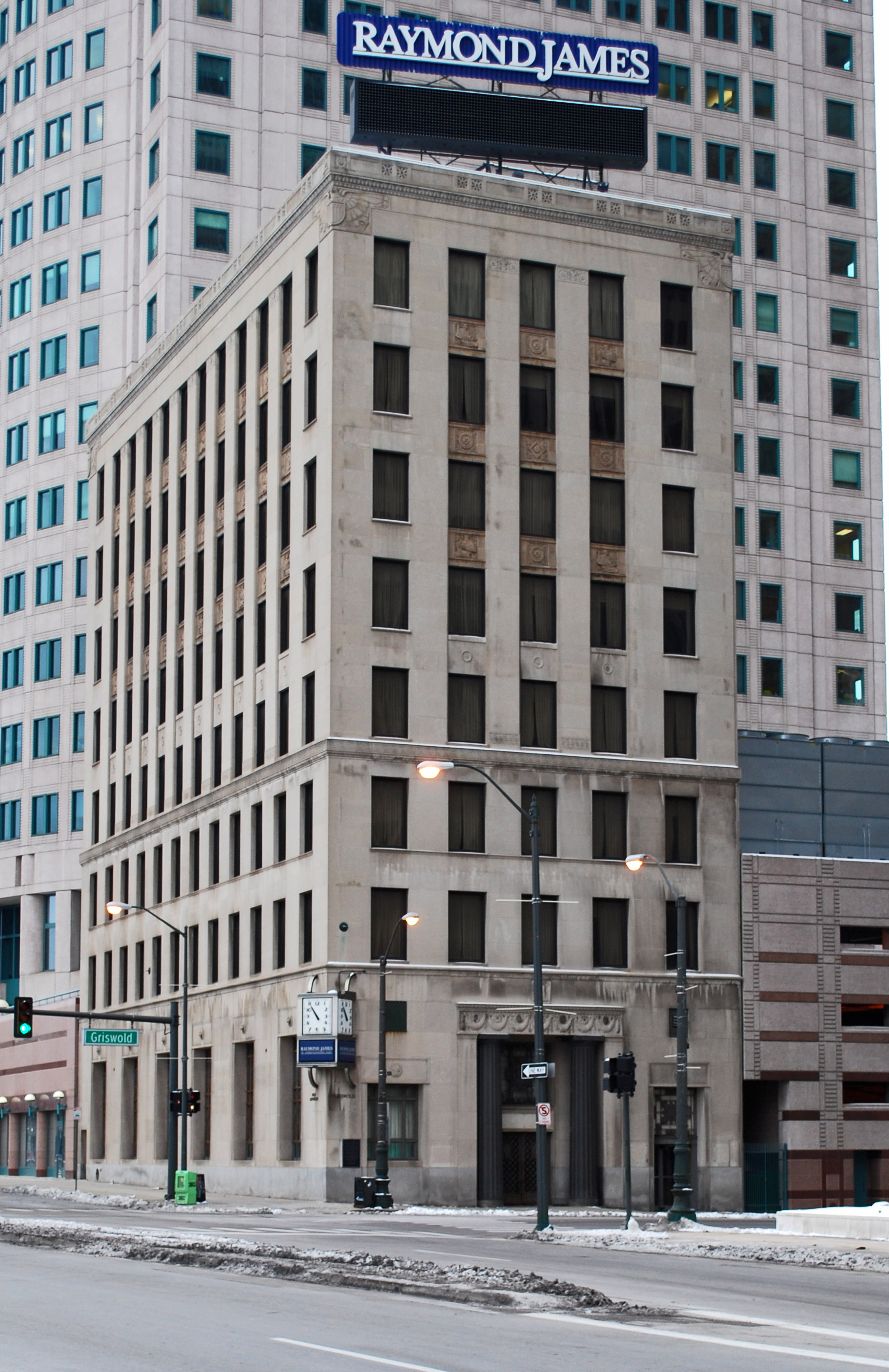

42°19′42.2″N 83°2′45.5″W

The Standard Savings & Loan Building is an 8 1/2-story, flat-roofed office building with a steel frame sheathed in limestone. It was constructed in 1927 designed by Luis Kamper and features work by sculptor Corrado Parducci. Standard Savings & Loan was established in 1893 with offices at the corner of Griswold and Lafayette. The bank moved to the corner of Griswold and Larned in 1913, and in 1927 purchased land at the corner of Griswold and Jefferson, the site of this building. The lot is the site of first building in Detroit, the original Ste. Anne's Catholic Church, constructed in 1701.

The building constructed for Standard Savings has twelve bays on the Jefferson facade and five along Griswold. The Griswold entrance of the building is flanked by black granite columns and features an original decorative metal gate. Signage from Raymond James brokerage, a later tenant, is still on the roof.

Standard Savings & Loan survived through the Great Depression and into the postwar years. In the 1950s it applied for a federal charter, and in 1985 changed from a savings and loan to banking operations, becoming Standard Federal Bank. The company was eventually acquired by ABN AMRO.

=== Detroit Federal Savings and Loan Association Building (501 Woodward) (1971) ===
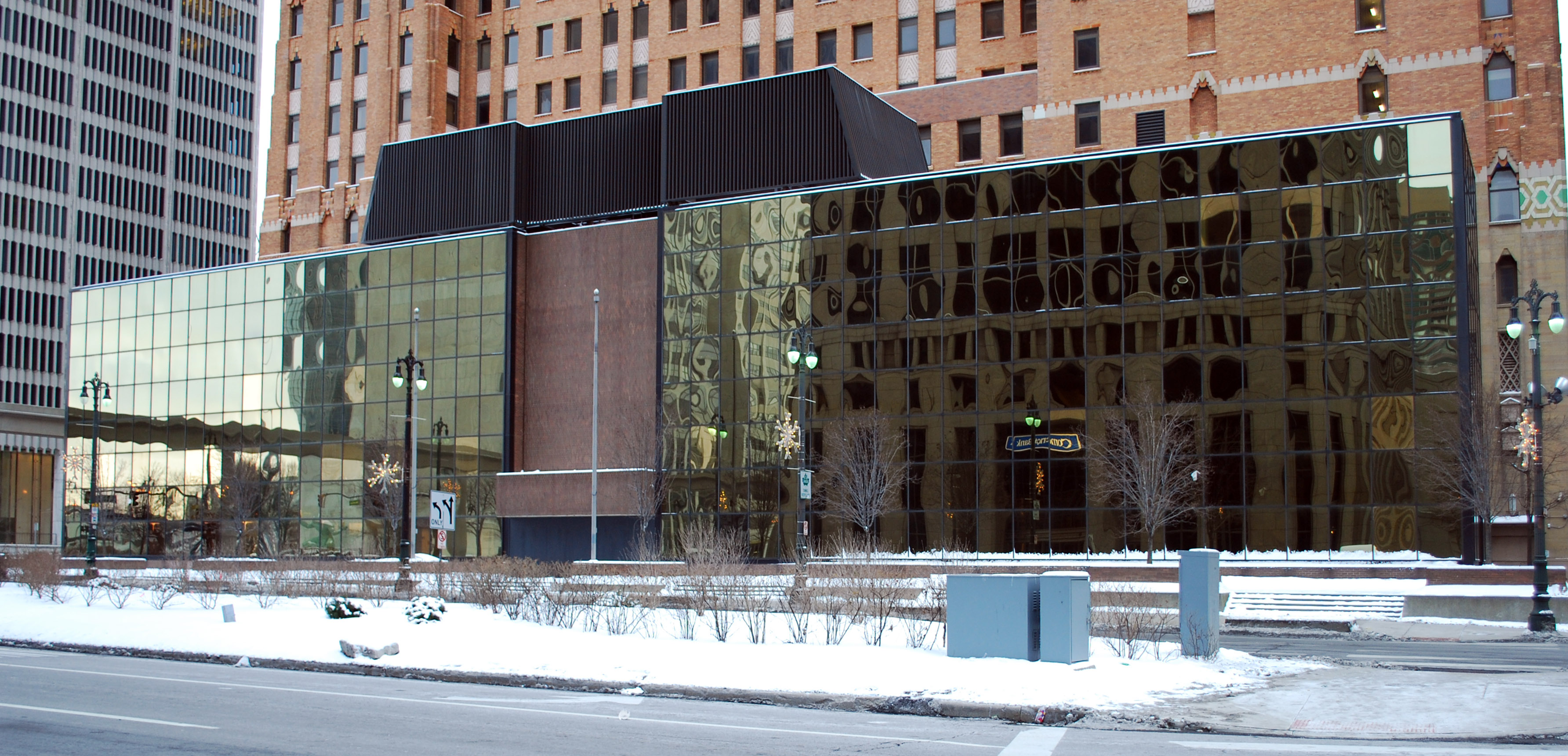

42°19′47″N 83°2′45″W

The Detroit Federal Savings and Loan Association Building is a four-story glass-and-steel bank building designed in 1971 by Ted Rogvoy Associates. The building is set back from Woodward the same distance as the Chase Tower Detroit (National Bank of Detroit Building) just to the north. Because of its age, this building is a non-contributing property.

=== Guardian Building (500 Griswold) (1929) ===
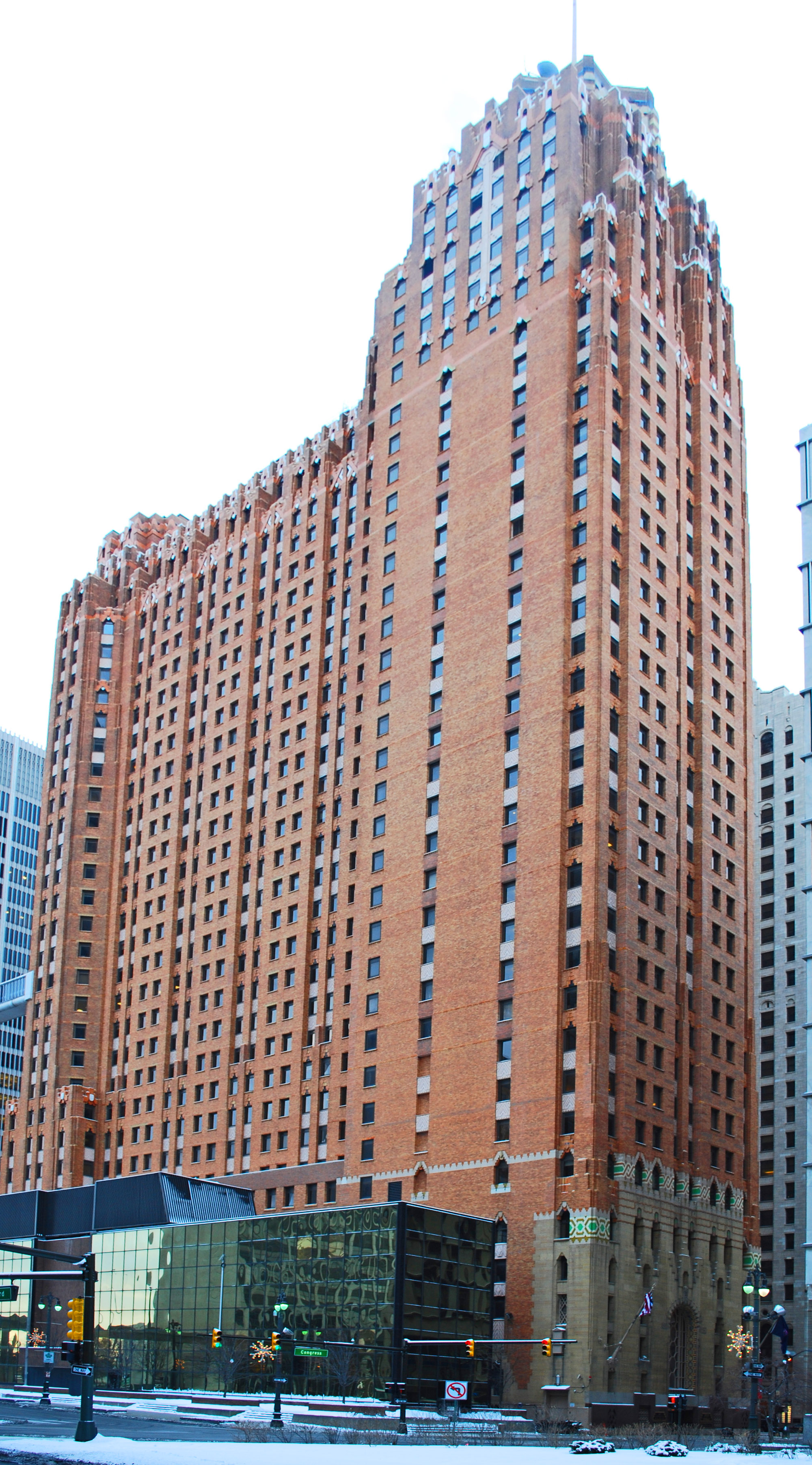

42°19′46″N 83°2′46″W

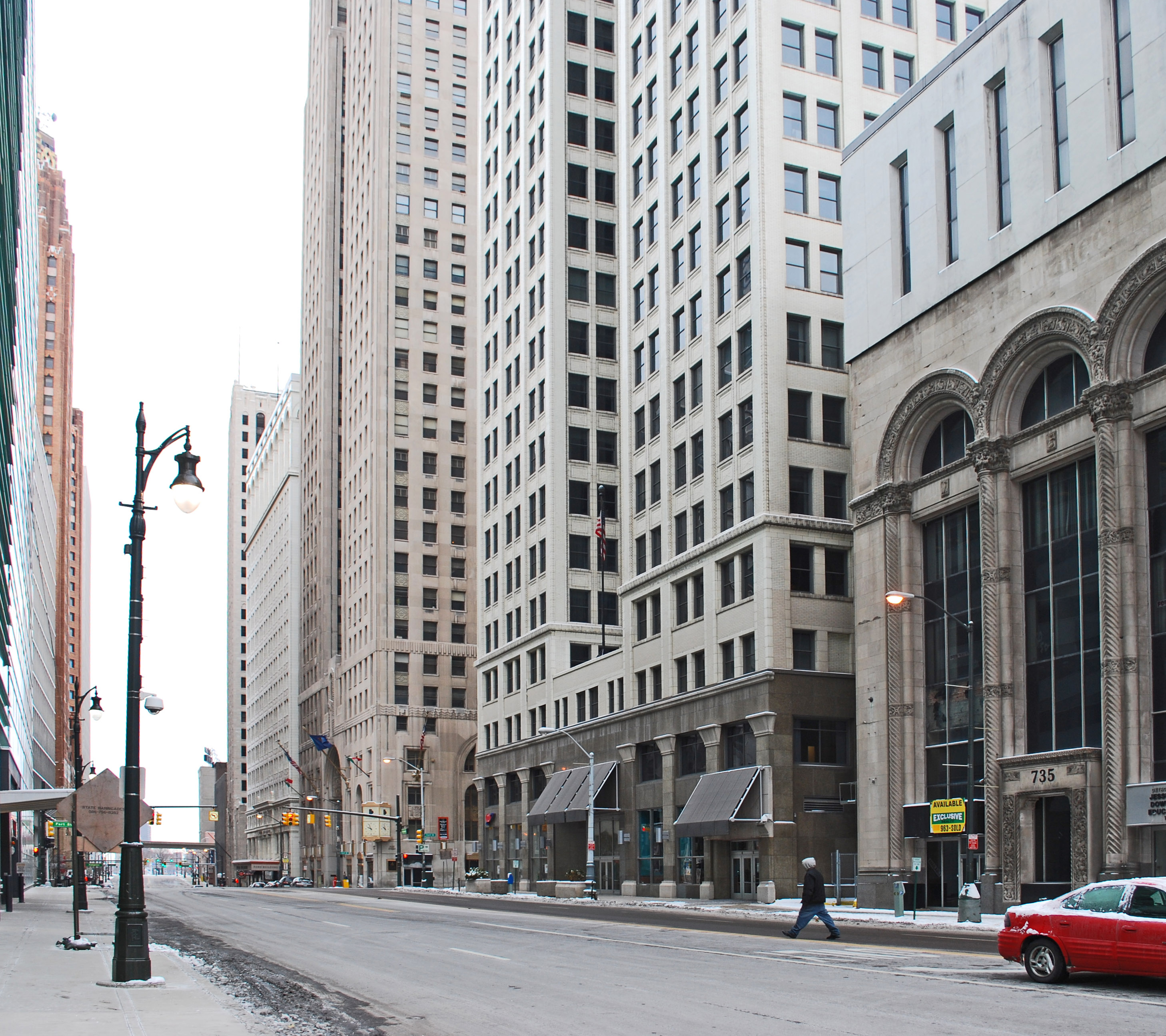
Detroit Financial District looking south along Griswold from Lafayette. The buildings, starting in the right foreground and working to the left, are the Security Trust Company Building, the Dime Building, the Greater Penobscot Building, the Ford Building, and the Buhl Building. The edges of the Guardian Building and the National Bank of Detroit Building can be seen on the left.

The Guardian Building is a forty-story office building, built in 1927–1929 by architect Wirt C. Rowland for the Union Trust Company. The Union Trust Company was founded in Detroit in 1890 by Senator James McMillan, and Dexter M. Ferry, along with investments from Russell A. Alger, Col. Frank J. Hecker, and Christian H. Buhl. Union Trust developed a reputation for catering to common laborers, and attracted numerous customers by offering mortgages and land contracts. By 1928, Union Trust had assets of $52 million, and merged with the similarly sized National Bank of Commerce, with the new company called the Guardian Detroit Union Group.

The new company was larger than the facilities of either bank, so a new building was called for. The bank hired the architectural firm of Smith Hinchman and Grylls and their young architect Wirt C. Rowland. Rowland designed an exotic building blending Art Deco, Mayan, and Native American elements. The base of the steel-framed building is sheathed in red granite, and second and third stories are covered with yellow stone. The remainder of the building is sheathed with a custom-made dark orange brick. Terra cotta and Pewabic tile provide accents to the exterior brick.

The entrance is sheltered under an arch covered with Pewabic tile; two figures by sculptor Corrado Parducci flank the door. On the interior, the lobby contains stained glass windows, and the vault is covered with brightly colored Rookwood tile, coordinated by Mary Chase Perry Stratton; the structure is modelled after Beauvais Cathedral. A mural map of Michigan dominates one end of the lobby.

As the building was under construction, Union Group continued to acquire other financial holdings, and by the time the Guardian Building opened in 1929, the company had assets worth over $400 million, representing 40% of Detroit's banking industry. However, the Great Depression hit the bank hard; the Union Trust Company reconsolidated into the Union Guardian Trust in 1930, and failed in 1933. The bank went into receivership under the name New Union Building Corporation, which retained the building.

The Guardian Building was used during World War II by the US Army, and later both DTE Energy and General Electric were tenants. In 1989, the Guardian was named a National Historic Landmark, and renovations in 1988 and 2003 restored much of the original Art Deco decoration in the building. In 2007, the Wayne County government purchased the building.

=== Vinton Building (600 Woodward) (1917) ===
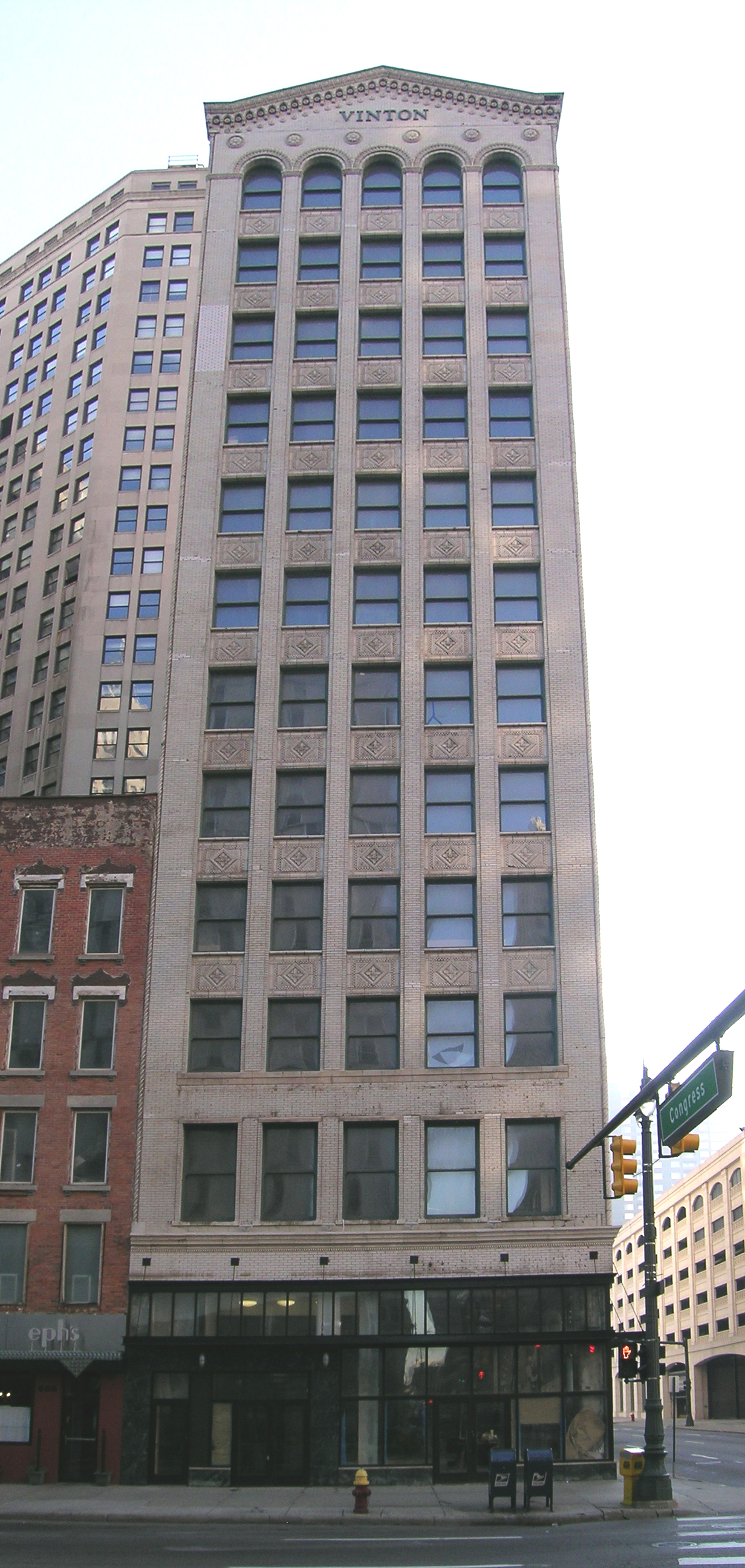

42°19′49.6″N 83°2′44″W

The Vinton Building is a twelve-story flat-roofed office building with steel frame clad in light gray brick with terra cotta details. The building was constructed in 1917, and designed by Albert Kahn for Robert K. Vinton of the Vinton Company, general contractors. The façades are in the Commercial Style, influenced by Arts and Crafts style. Twisted columns outline the edge of the façade' the name of the building is prominently displayed at the parapet.

The Vinton Company initially used the upper floors of the building, and a bank inhabited the ground floor. In 1925 the Guaranty Trust Company bought the building. Guaranty folded in 1933.

=== Detroit Tool Depot Building (608 Woodward) (1851) ===
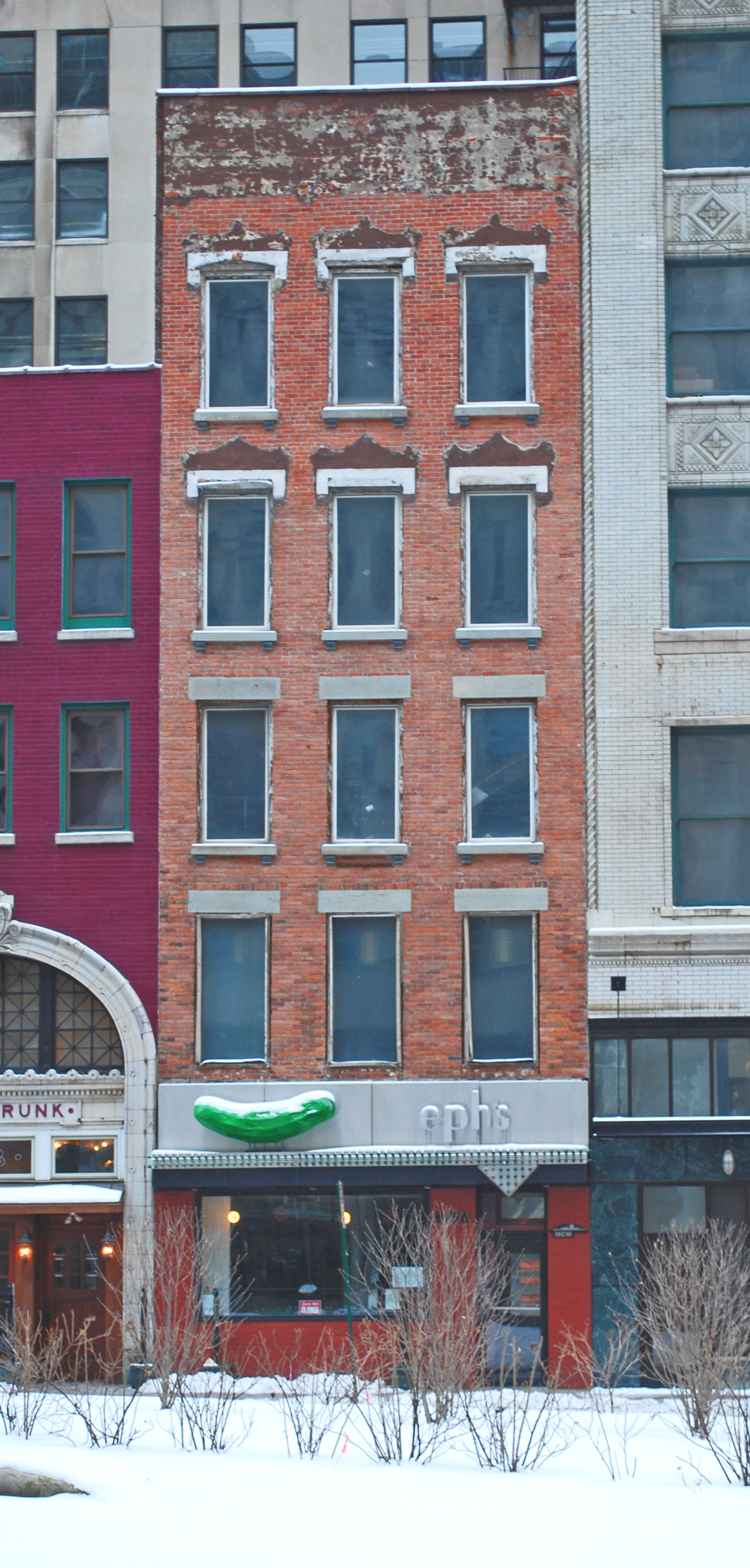

42°19′49.9″N 83°2′44.1″W

The Martin Limbach Hardware Building is a five-story, three-bay building. It was originally built in 1851 and renovated in 1877 for the Detroit Tool Depot. The facade is of brick, with stone lintels. Originally the building had three bays but they were demolished in 1917 for the Vinton Building. The first floor has been renovated for a deli.

=== Traub Brothers Jewelry Building (612 Woodward) (1879) ===
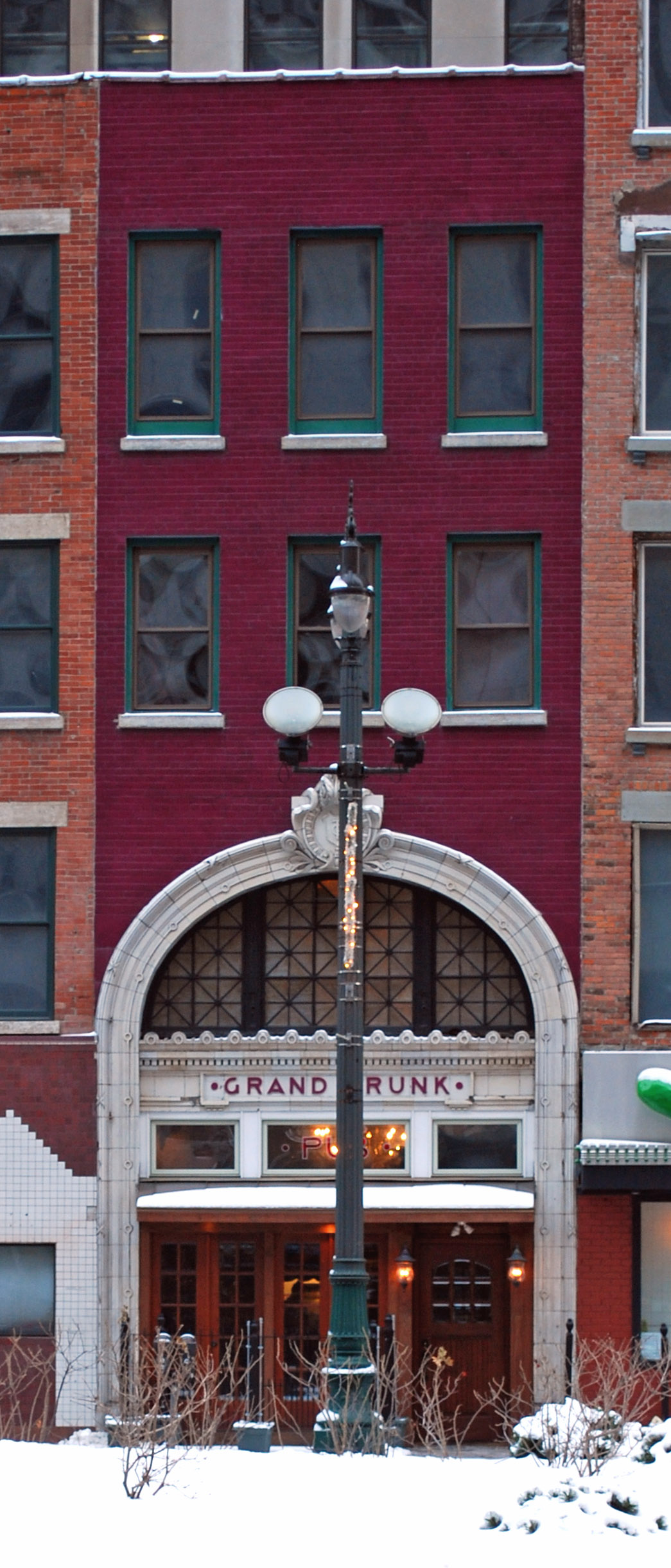

42°19′50.1″N 83°2′44.25″W

The Traub Brothers Jewelry Building is a four-story wood-frame brick building, built in 1879. Presumably the first floor was used as retail while the upper floors were used as residential space. The building was purchased by Grand Trunk Railroad early in the 20th century, and in 1911 it was renovated to serve as their ticketing office. Grand Trunk removed the second floor and installed a vaulted ceiling reminiscent of period railroad stations. The renovation added a rounded arch on the second floor, filled with paned windows and surrounded by terra cotta detailing with the company's logo. The finely detailed interior woodwork also includes company logos. Although the lower floors of the building were completely altered during this renovation, the upper two floors still retain the original window shapes.

The building currently houses Foran's Grand Trunk Pub, and the first floor has recently been restored.

=== 616 Woodward (1880) ===
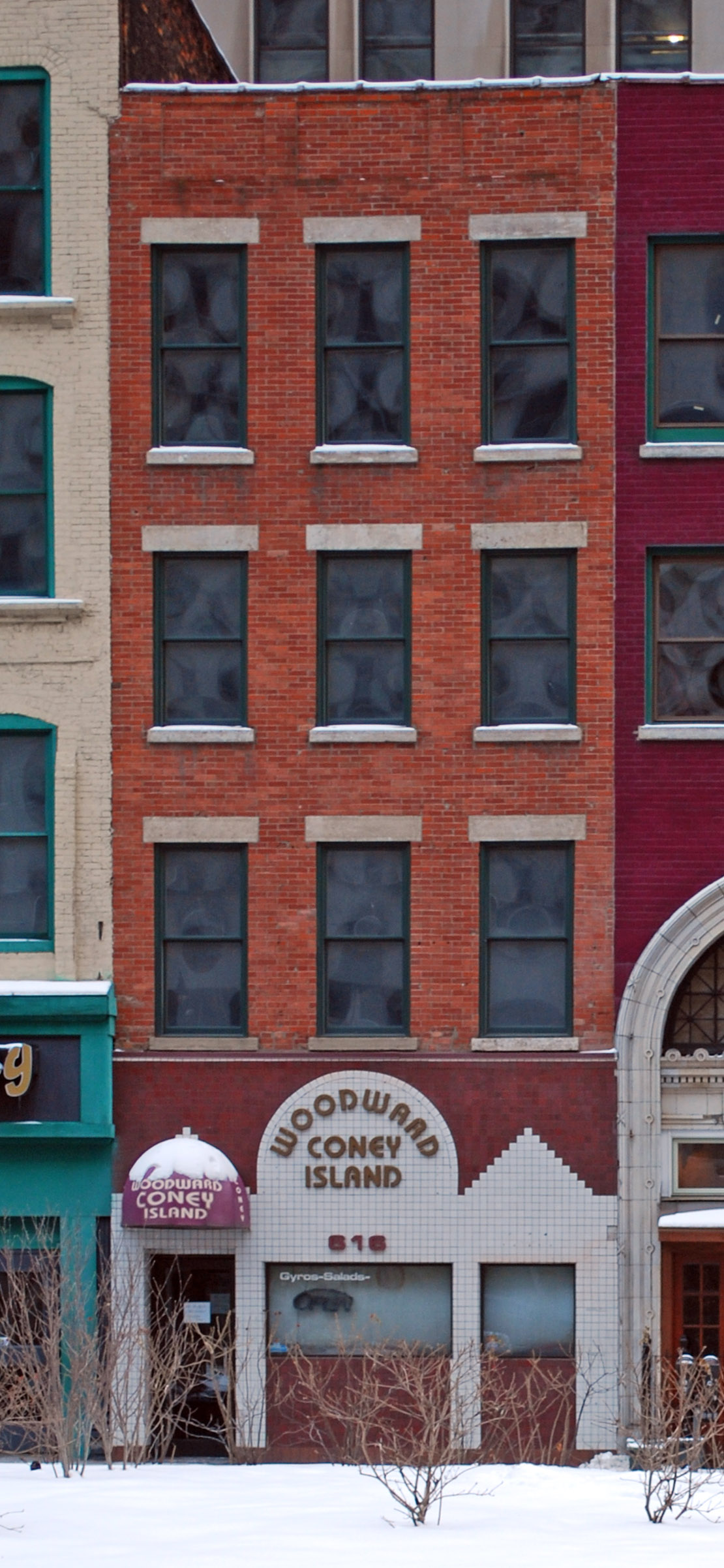

42°19′50.2″N 83°2′44.3″W

The building at 616 Woodward Avenue is a three-story wood-framed pitched-roof brick building, originally built by the W. G. Vinton Company in 1880. The first-floor storefront has been substantially renovated, but the upper stories still have original stone lintels and sills.

=== Mabley and Company Building (620 Woodward) (1876) ===
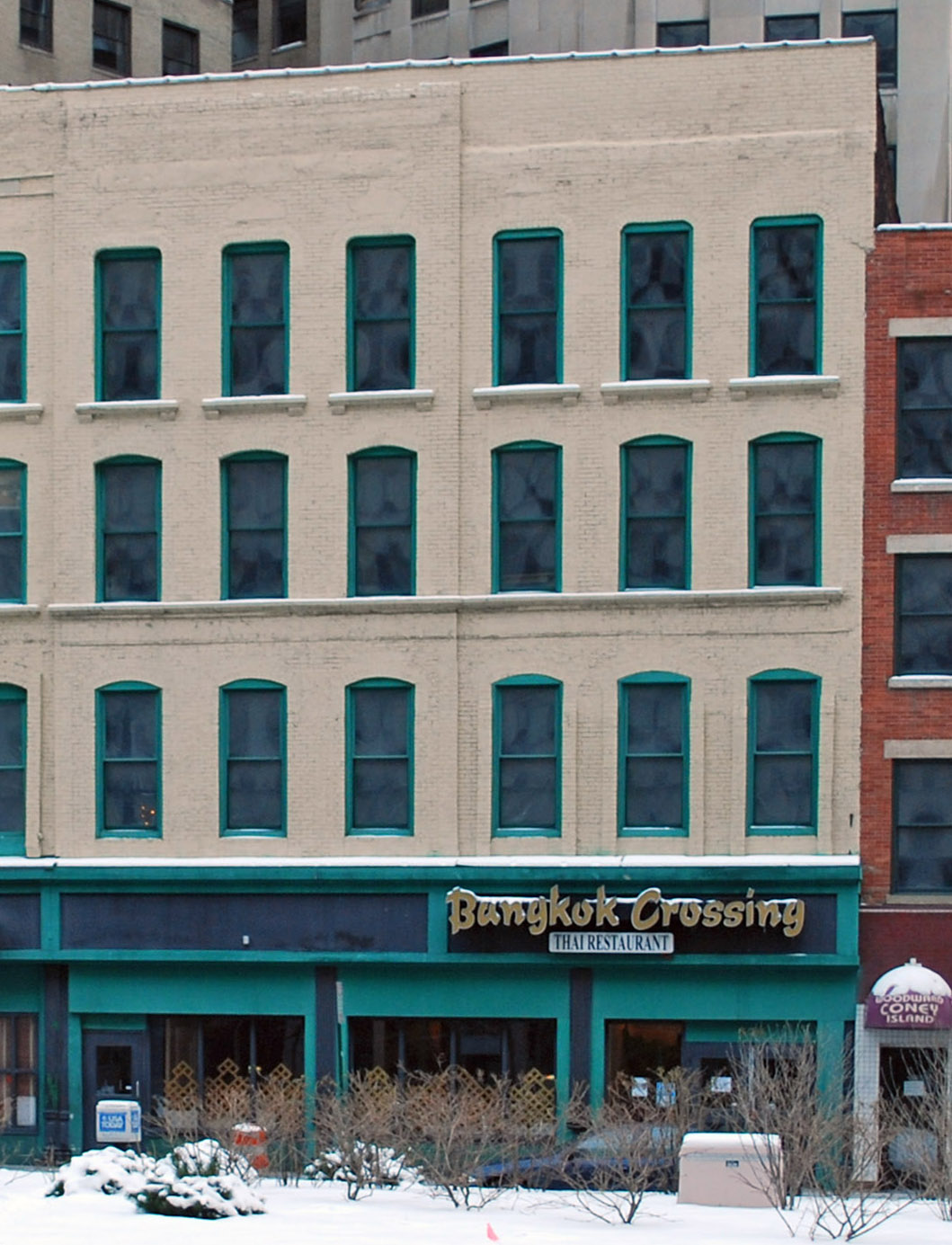

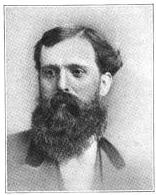
Christopher R. Mabley

42°19′50.5″N 83°2′44.4″W

The Mabley and Company Building at 620 Woodward consists of two four-story wood-frame buildings, now combined into one. The buildings were constructed in 1876-80 for Mabley & Company, a department store owned by mercantilist C. R. Mabley. Mabley had started business in this Woodward location in 1870, and by 1876 his company was one of the largest in Michigan. Mabley purchased several adjoining lots and there built a series of buildings along both sides of Woodward to house his department store. Mabley died in 1885 and the business began to languish, although Mabley stores remained in Detroit until 1929.

Much of the detailing on these buildings, including roof line ornamentation, and window trim, is now missing, possibly due to major alterations in 1918. The first-floor storefronts have been renovated.

=== Mabley and Company Building (630 Woodward) (1876) ===
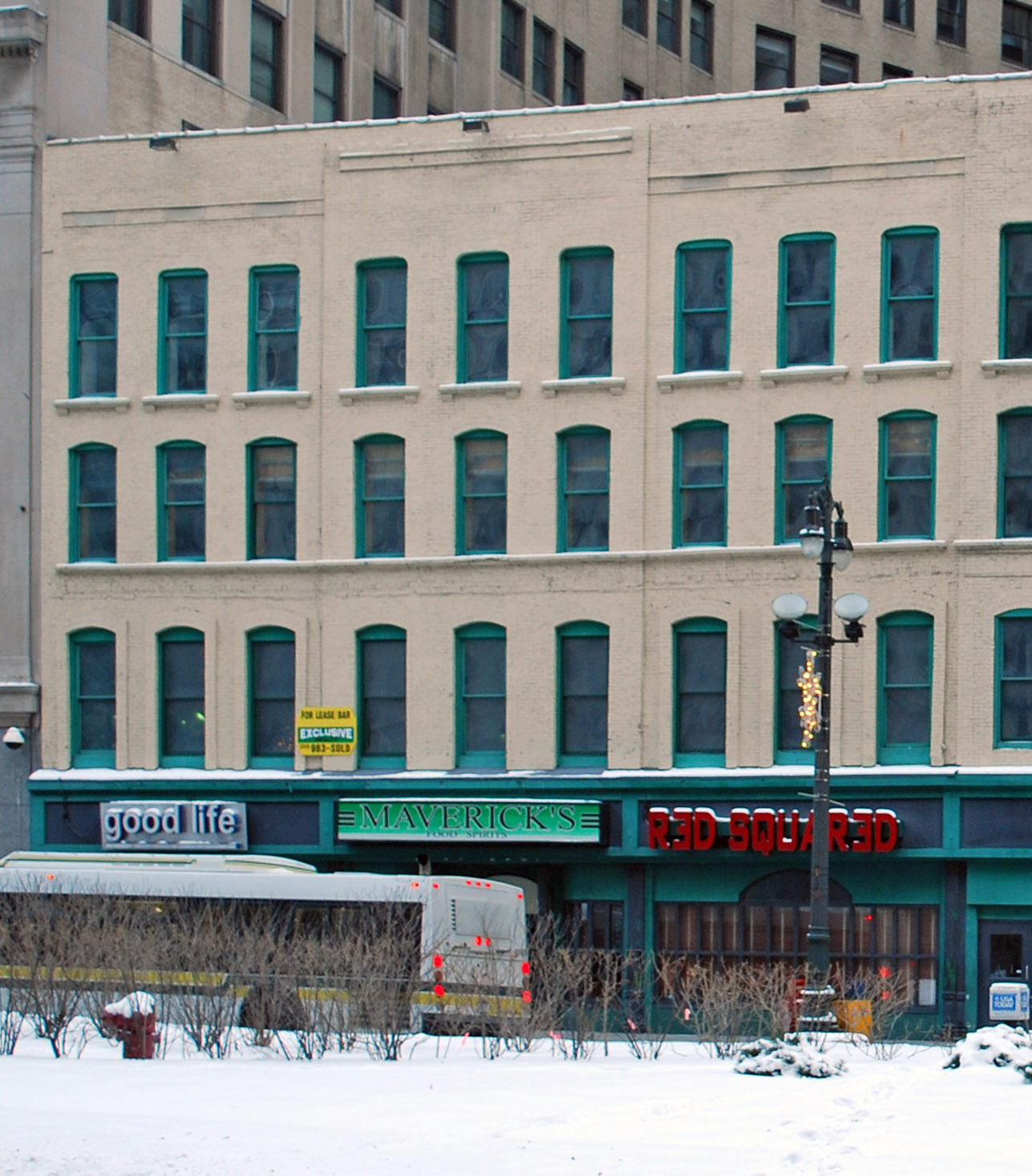

42°19′50.8″N 83°2′44.8″W

The Mabley and Company Building at 630 Woodward consists of three four-story wood-frame buildings, now combined into one. Like the buildings at 620 Woodward, these were originally part of the Mabley & Company department store. Contemporaneous histories label the five buildings at 620 and 630 Woodward as the "clothing, hat, cap, and furnishing stores of Mabley & Company."

Like the buildings at 620 Woodward, the first-floor storefronts have been renovated and external decoration has been removed.

=== First National Building (660 Woodward) (1922) ===
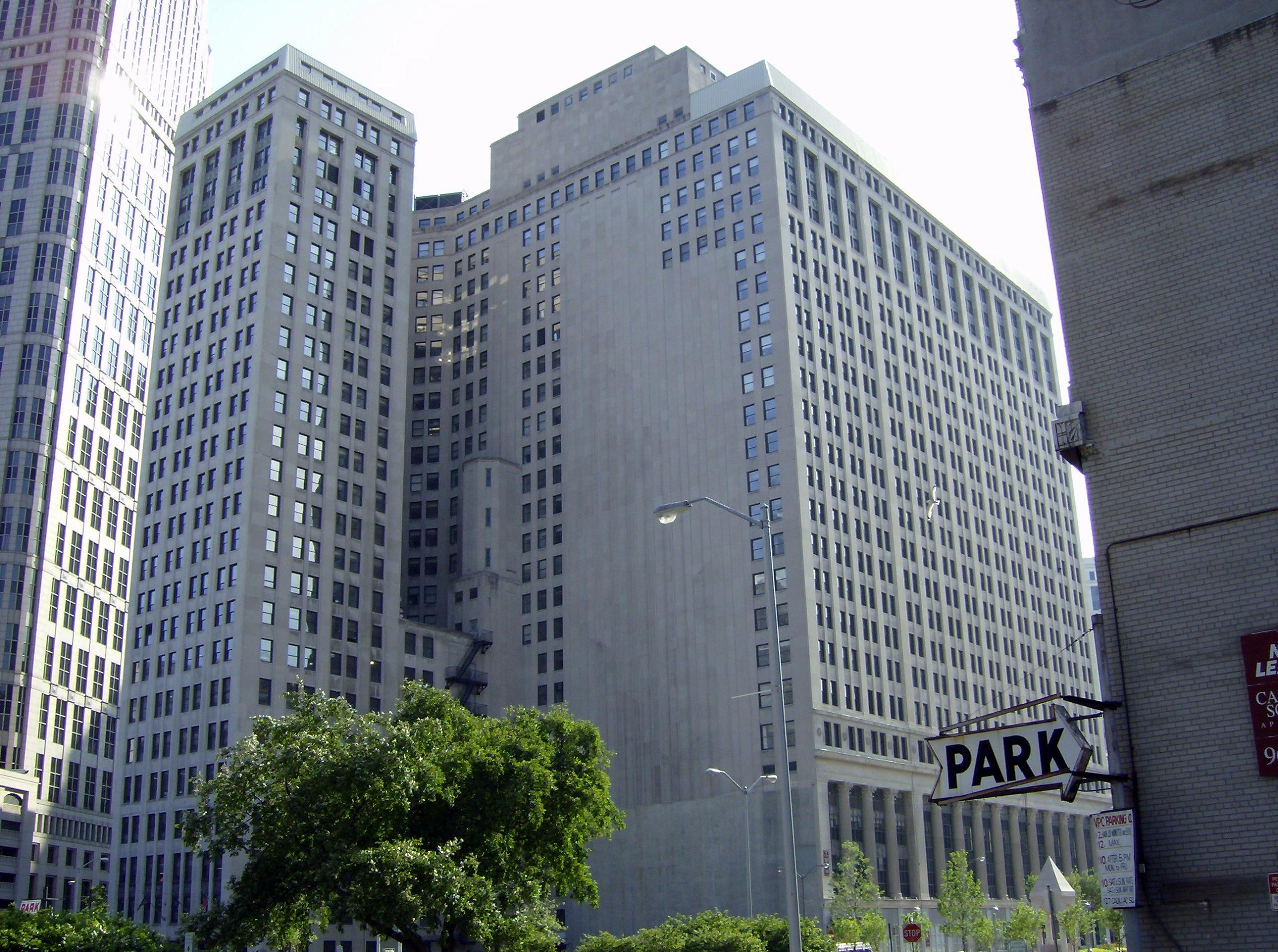

42°19′51.7″N 83°2′45.2″W

The First National Building is a 24-story steel-framed flat-roofed building faced with limestone. The building was designed by Albert Kahn and constructed in 1920–22. The First National Bank was established in 1863; a year later the Second National Bank was founded. The two institutions merged in 1914, calling themselves the "First and Old Detroit National Bank". The bank occupied a large part of the Ford Building until it moved into this building in 1922, when it shortened its name to "First National Bank".

The building is an irregular shape, designed to fit its lot. The facades facing Woodward and Cadillac Square are sheathed in grey granite at the street level and limestone above; these facades have massive five-story Corinthian pillars modeled after the columns of the Temple of Castor and Pollux in the Roman Forum. The first floor of the building houses retail space, while the upper floors were designed as commercial offices.

=== The Qube (611 Woodward) (1959) ===
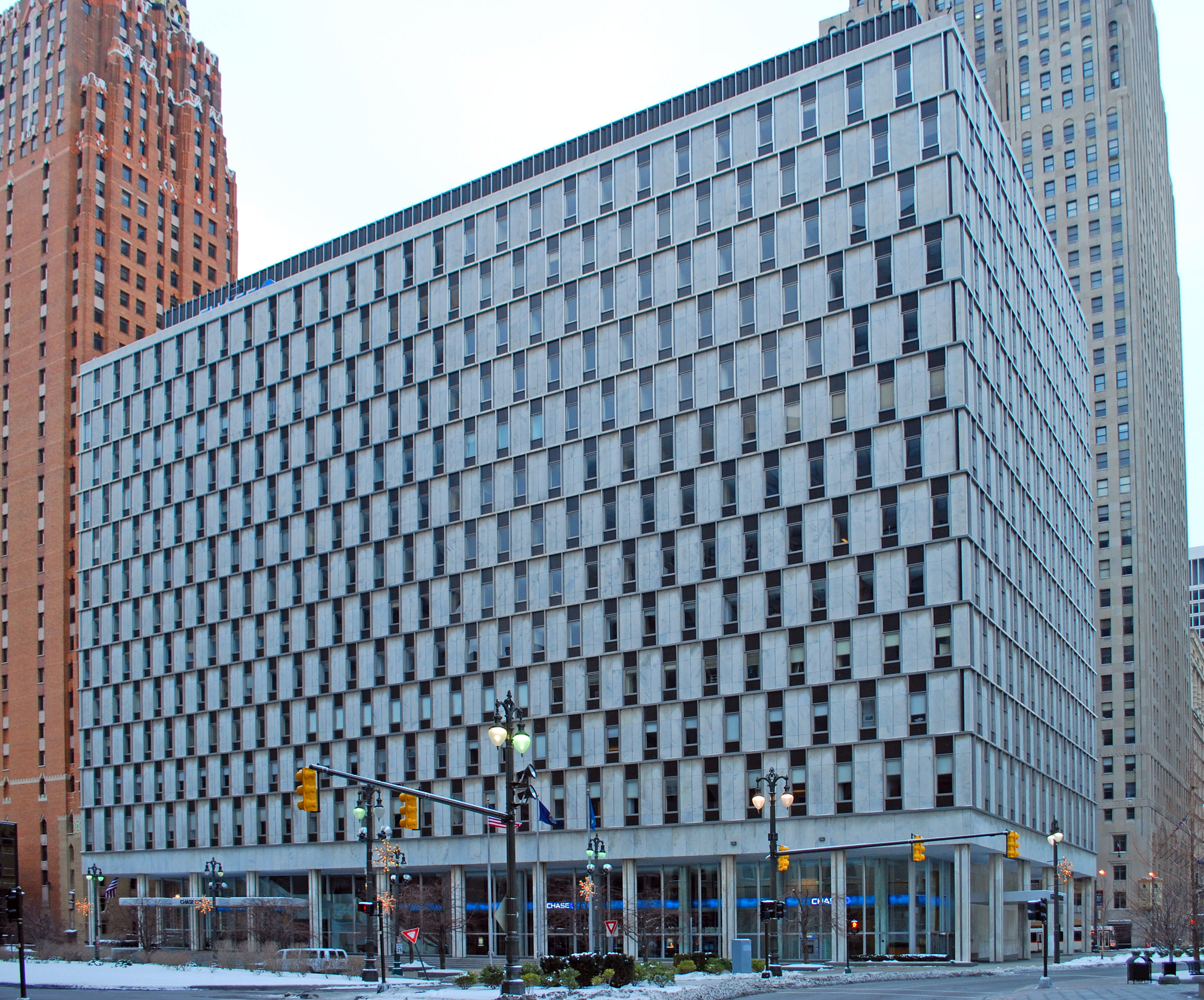

42°19′50″N 83°2′48″W

The Qube (originally the National Bank of Detroit Building) is a flat-roofed fourteen-story building built in 1959 and fully remodeled in 2011. Albert Kahn Associates designed the building for the National Bank of Detroit. The location itself is notable since Detroit's first skyscraper, the Hammond Building (1889), once stood on this site.

The National Bank of Detroit was founded in 1933 by General Motors to provide banking services in the midst of the Great Depression. Its first offices were in the First National Bank Building. GM divested itself by 1945, but the bank still had a reputation as a conservative bank primarily servicing industry. The bank began expanding its reach in the 1950s, merging with suburban banks, and in 1959 moved its headquarters across the street into this building.

The Qube has a wall pattern of white marble alternating with square windows outlined with brown aluminum. The upper stories of the building rest on a recessed base with royal blue spandrels. Local residents have sometimes nicknamed the building the "cheese grater" for its paneled exterior appearance.

In 1995, the National Bank of Detroit merged with First Chicago Corp to form First Chicago NBD. Three years later, the new bank merged with Banc One Corp to become Bank One. Bank One became part of JPMorgan Chase in 2004. The Building was known as Chase Tower from 2006 to 2011.

=== Detroit Foundation Hotel (Old Fire Department Headquarters) (250 W. Larned) (1929) ===
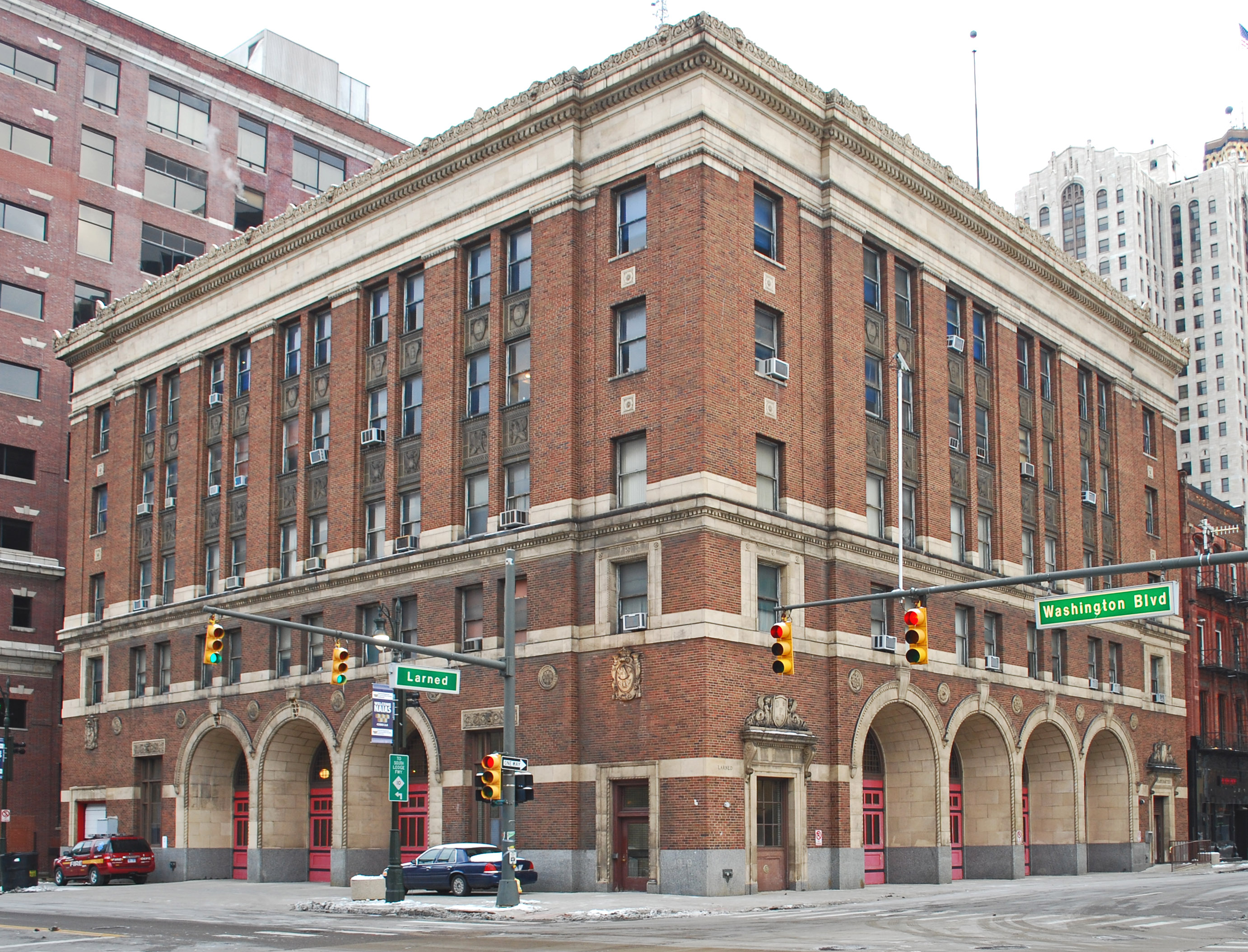

42°19′42″N 83°2′54″W

The Detroit Fire Department Headquarters is a five-story Neoclassical building with a steel frame designed by Hans Gehrke and built in 1929. The building is constructed of dark red brick trimmed with terra cotta, sitting on a grey granite bulkhead. The Larned facade is divided into six bays; the four central bays contain arched openings, trimmed with terra cotta, housing fire engines. The eastern bay contains the entrance to the building. A terra cotta beltcourse separates the first story from those above; these upper stories still contain the original double-hung windows. The Washington Boulevard facade of much the same as the one on Larned.

The building site has been used by the Fire Department since 1840. The department moved from the building in the 2010s, and the building was converted into a boutique hotel, opening in 2017.

=== 234 W. Larned (1882) ===
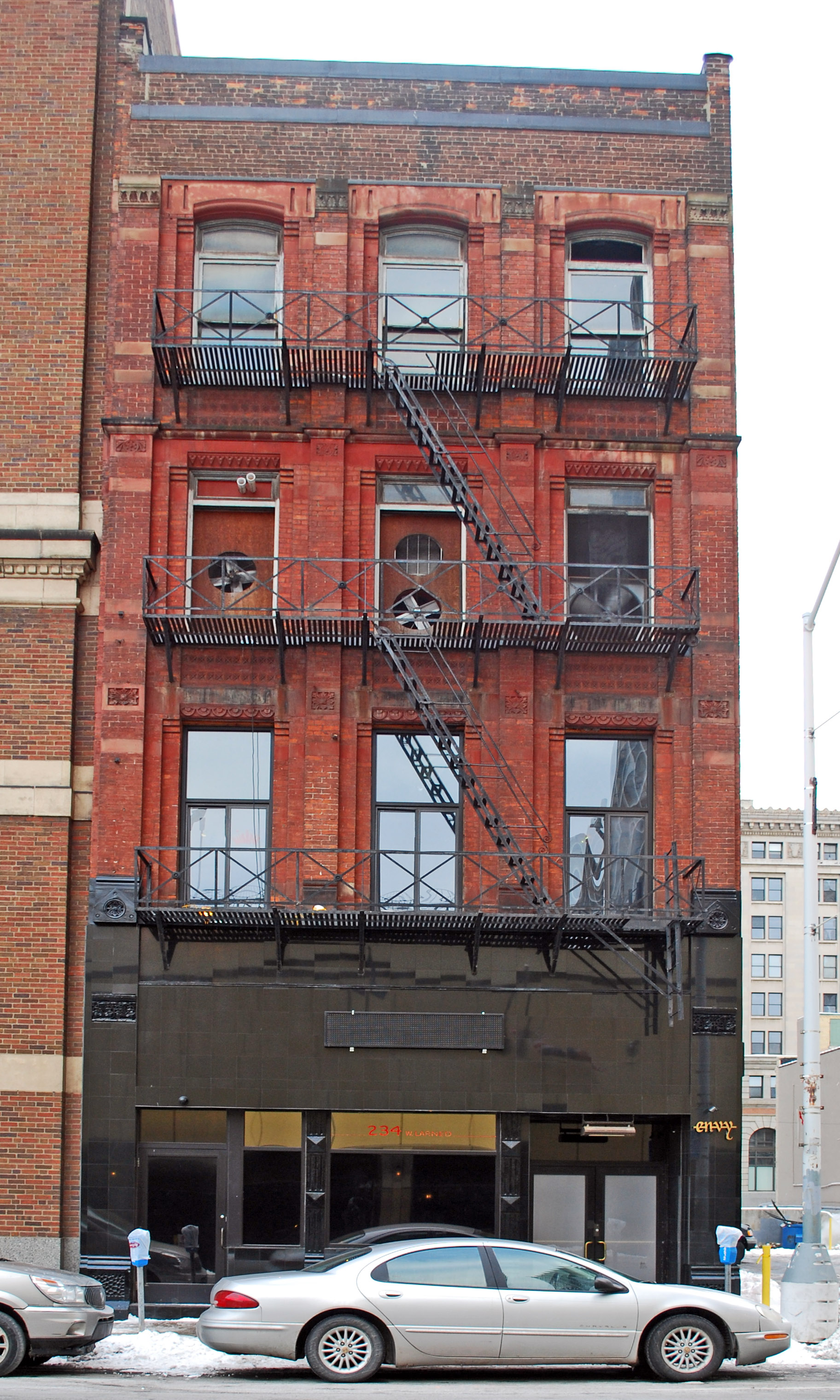

42°19′42″N 83°2′53.2″W

The building at 234 West Larned is a four-story commercial building faced with terra cotta and stone trim, constructed in 1882. The upper three floors are finished with reddish brick, and have three bays of windows with stone lintels separated by pier capitals. The first floor has been renovated with modern tile. From the 1930s through the 1980s, the ground floor building housed the Pontchartrain Wine Cellars where the sparkling wine Cold Duck is purported to have been created.

=== Buhl Building (535 Griswold) (1925) ===
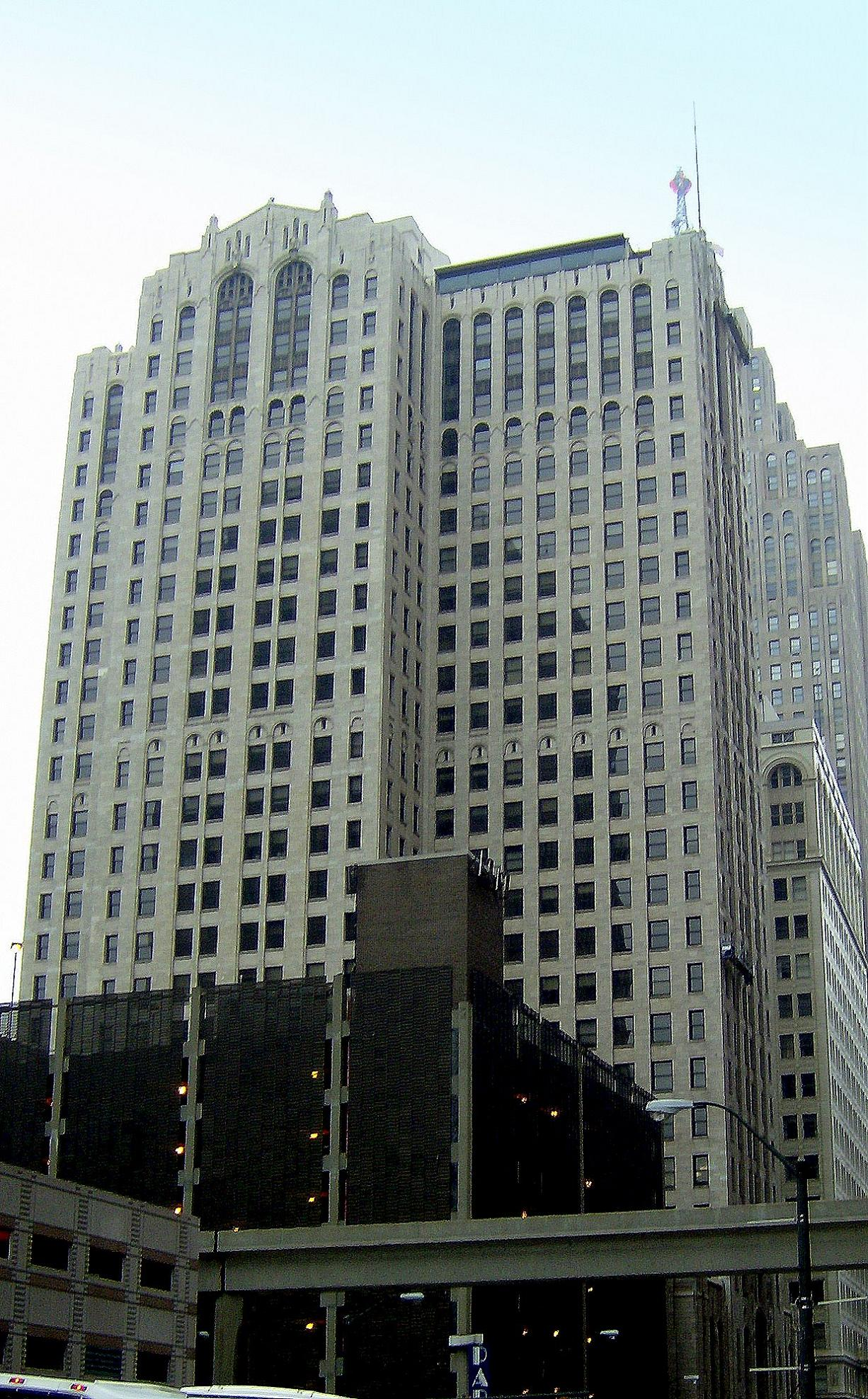

42°19′46″N 83°2′49″W

The Buhl Building is a steel-framed, flat-roofed 26-story office building designed in 1925 by Wirt C. Rowland of Smith, Hinchman, and Grylls for the firm of Frederick and Christian H. Buhl. The Buhls had originally made money in manufacturing, founding the Detroit Locomotive Works and the Buhl Iron Works (later Detroit Copper and Brass). From there they branched into retail opening a hardware store, and property development.

One of Christian's grandsons, Arthur H. Buhl, was president of the buhl Land Company at the time this building was constructed in the 1920s. At the time, demand for office space in Detroit was soaring, and Buhl decided to replace the company's small office building on Griswold with a much larger building. He hired Wirt Roland, who designed a 26-story building where the four lower floors of the building had a rectangular footprint, while the upper floors were in the shape of a cross. The cruciform shape allowed the building to take advantage of natural light and ventilation, as well as providing a larger number of desirable corner offices. The exterior is sheathed in cream-colored terra cotta. Romanesque and Gothic details on the exterior were created by sculptor Corrado Parducci.

=== Murphy Building (155 W. Congress) (1903) ===
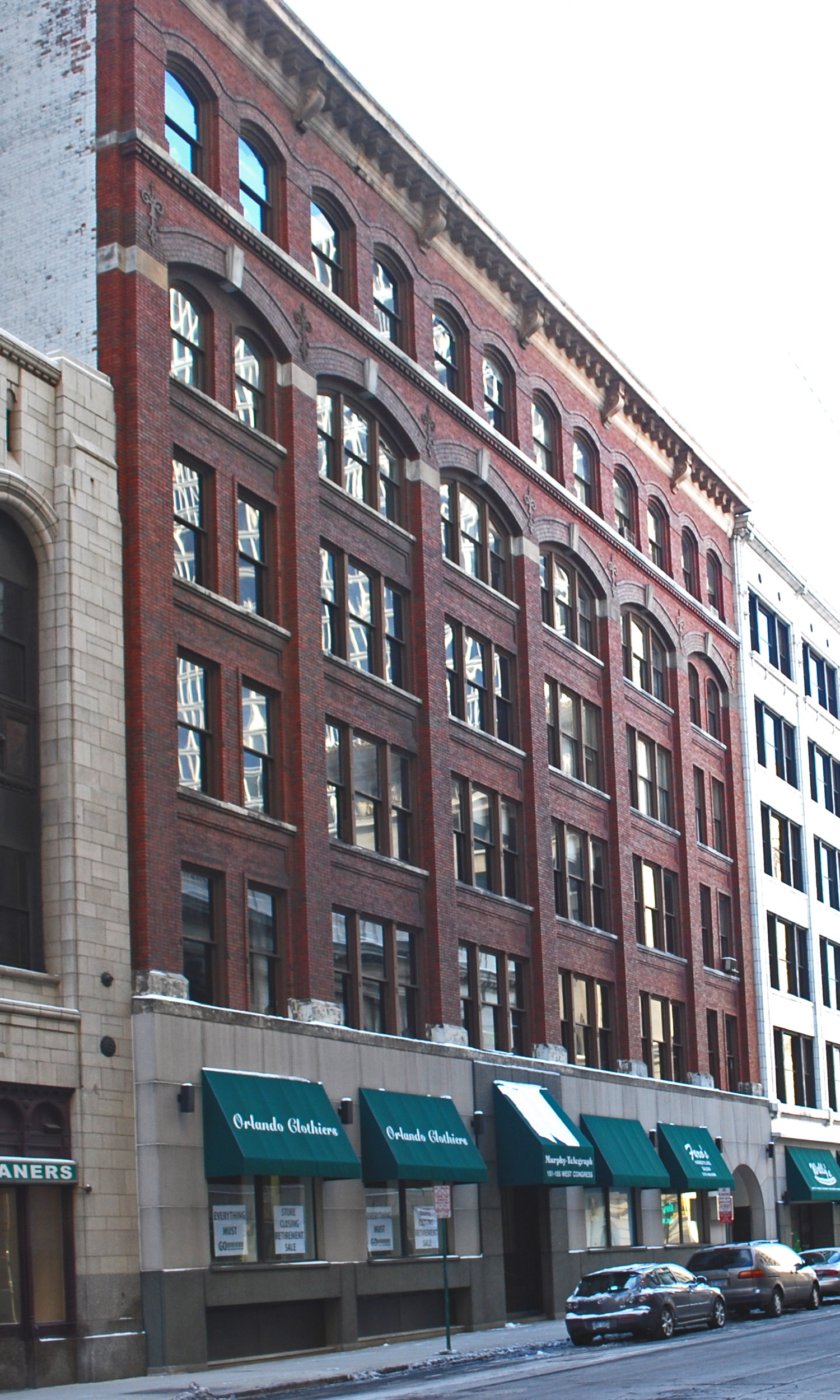

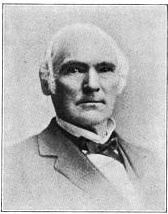
Simon J. Murphy

42°19′45.5″N 83°2′51″W

The Murphy Building was constructed in 1903 for businessman Simon J. Murphy, who intended the building to house small manufacturing enterprises; it was originally known as the "Murphy Power Building". Simon J. Murphy was a Maine lumberman who made his fortune in timber, oil, and mining. Murphy owned substantial property in downtown Detroit, and established the Murphy Power Company and built this structure shortly before his death in 1905. The original plan for the building was to rent space to manufacturers requiring power and/or steam heat. Murphy's companies also constructed a number of other buildings in the Financial district, including the original Penobscot building which was under construction at the time of Simon Murphy's death. His son William H. Murphy continued the construction of the Penobscot Building, and added two more buildings of the same name, as well as a second Murphy Power Building (now the Marquette Building) in 1906.

The Murphy Building is six stories tall, with a flat roof, and is constructed of brick and terra cotta. The front facade is divided into six bays by piers stretching from the second to fifth stories. Two entrances are in the front facade, one at center left and one in the righthand bay, which at one time was the entrance to a restaurant.

The original tenants of the building included shoe and cigar manufacturing firms. Later tenants were primarily printing and publishing concerns. The Murphy and the next-door Telegraph Building were both renovated, and now share a continuous floor plate and elevator core; the combined building is known as the "Murphy-Telegraph Building."

=== Telegraph Building (542 Shelby) (1913) ===
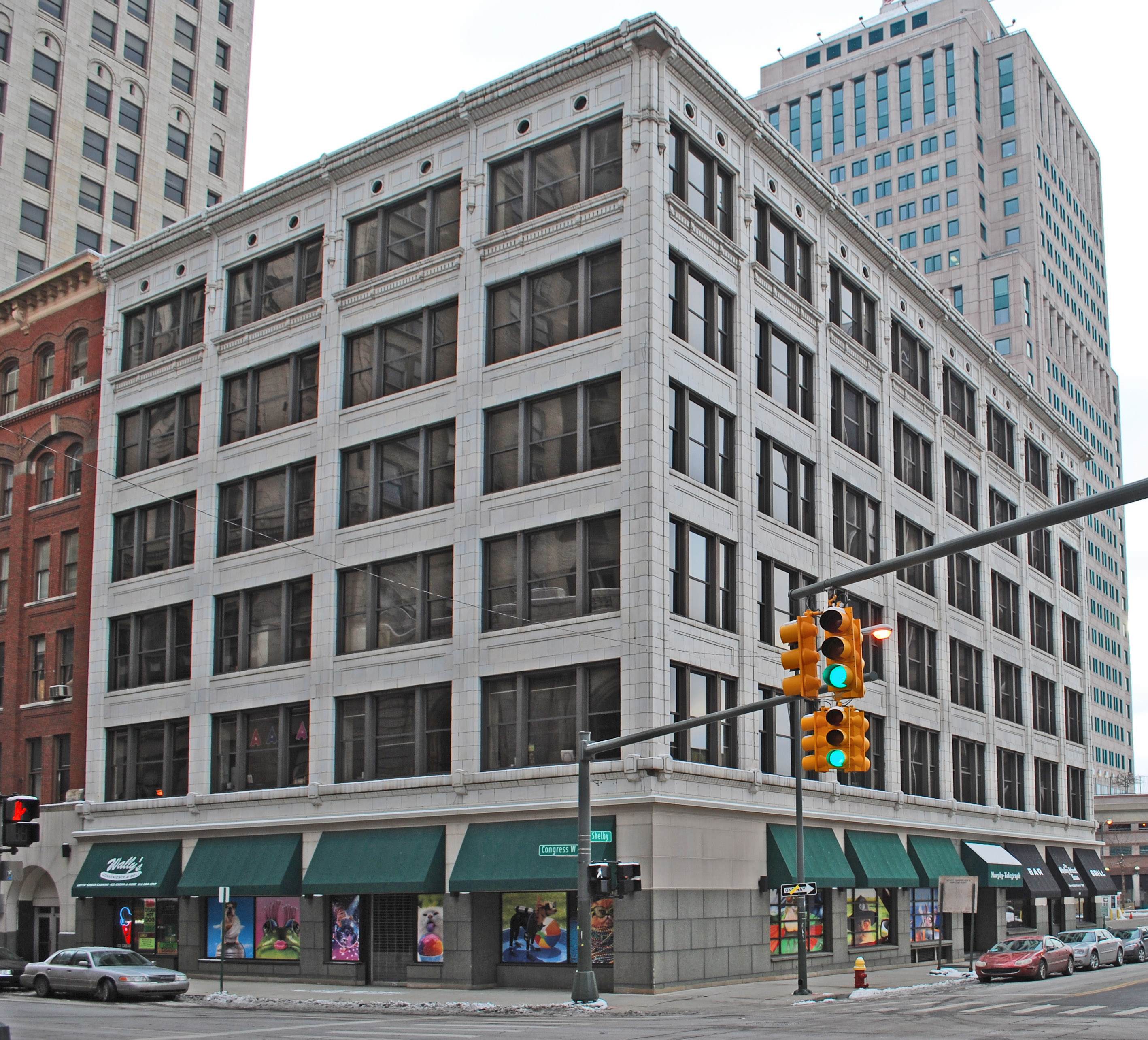

42°19′45″N 83°2′52″W

The Telegraph Building is a six-story, flat-roofed office building faced with white terra cotta, constructed in 1913. The street-level storefronts have been renovated with green cast panels and white marble. Above the storefronts, vertical piers frame the large windows that dominate the facade, arranged in four bays on the Congress facade and eight along Shelby. At the top, a frieze and simple cornice surmount the building.

The Telegraph Building originally housed the Detroit hub of Western Union. The Telegraph and the next-door Murphy Building have both been renovated, and now share a continuous floor plate and elevator core; the combined building is known as the "Murphy-Telegraph Building".

=== Ford Building (615 Griswold) (1908) ===
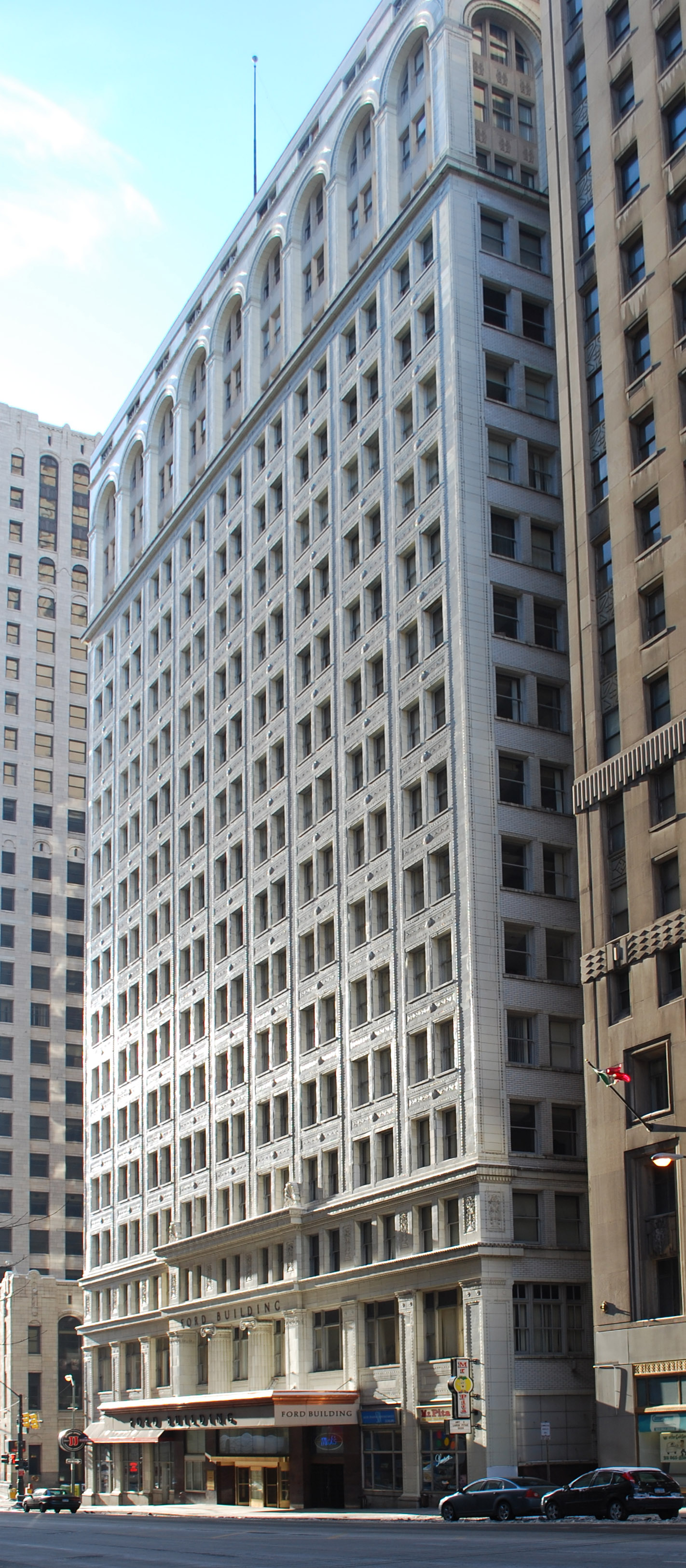

42°19′48″N 83°2′50″W

The Ford Building is a steel-framed, eighteen-story office building constructed in 1907–1908 by D. H. Burnham & Company for glass manufacturers Edward Ford and his son John B. Ford. The Fords had established the Edward Ford Plate Glass Company (later merging to become Libbey–Owens–Ford) near Toledo, Ohio in 1899, after disinvesting themselves of the Pittsburgh Plate Glass Company founded by Edward's father, John Baptiste Ford. The Fords constructed this building in Detroit as an investment property after unsuccessfully attempting to negotiate property purchases in Toledo.

The lower two floors of the Ford Building has piers an Ionic columns flanking a central entry. The exterior is covered with terra cotta; bands run above and below the third floor and another band of terra cotta divides the sixteenth and seventeenth floors. The windows of the top floor are arched.

=== Greater Penobscot Building (635 Griswold) (1928) ===
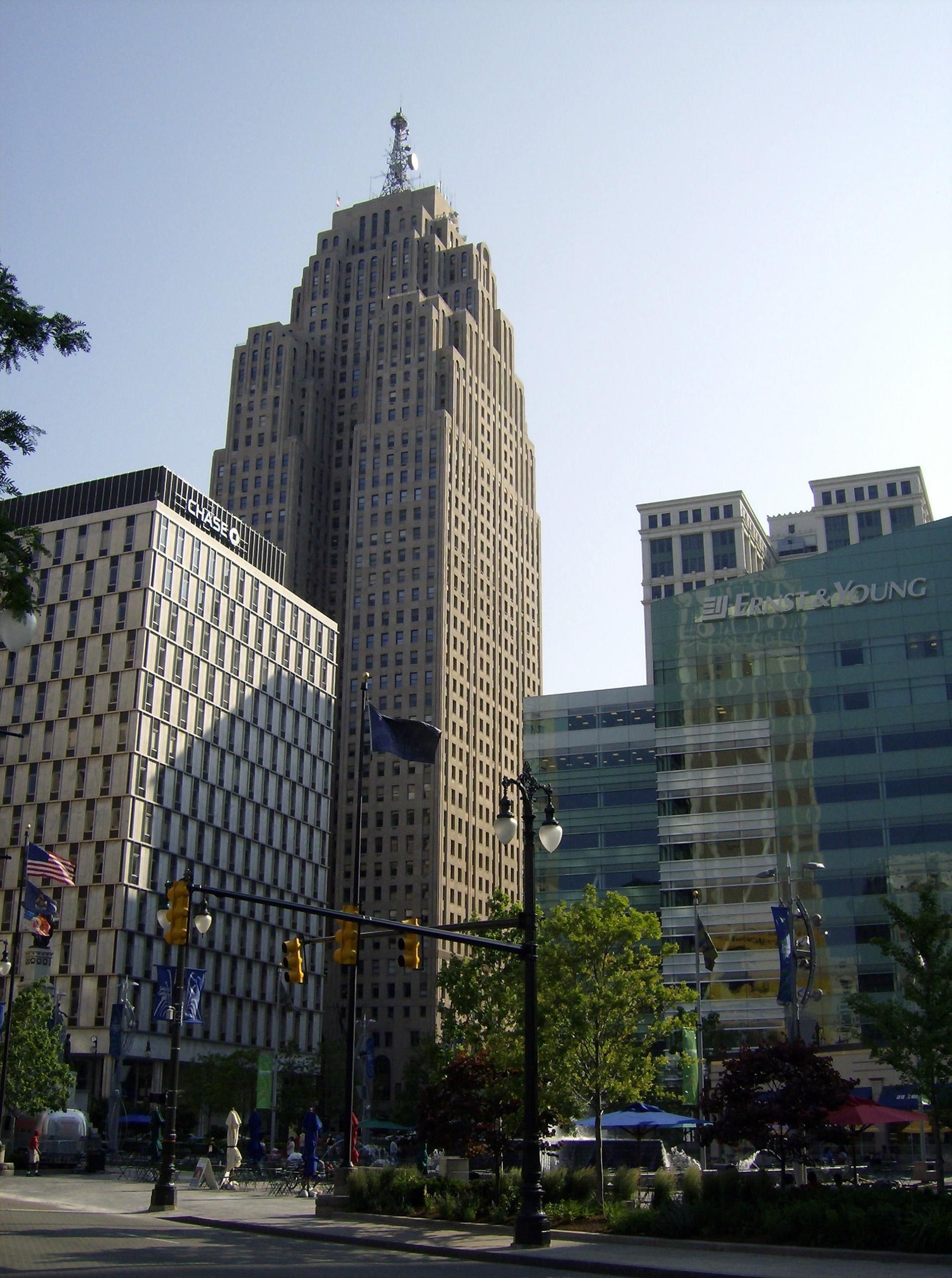

42°19′49″N 83°2′52″W

The Greater Penobscot Building is a 47-story skyscraper with a steel frame encased in granite and terra cotta. The building was constructed in 1927-29 by Wirt C. Rowland of Smith, Hinchman, and Grylls for William H. Murphy and the Simon J. Murphy Company at a cost of $8 million. Simon J. Murphy, William's father, was a Maine lumberman who had constructed the nearby Murphy Building and began the original Penobscot Building before his death in 1905. William followed in his father's footsteps, investing in diverse industries including early automobile manufacturers. William H. Murphy backed Henry Ford's Detroit Automobile Company as well as Ford's second venture, the Henry Ford Company (reorganized later as Cadillac). Murphy also built the New Penobscot Building as well at the Greater Penobscot Building.

The lower six floors of the building are square in plan, and the upper floors are H-shaped, with a series of setbacks starting at the 30th floor which define the silhouette of the top of the building. A 100-foot steel mast sits atop the building. Lighting at night accentuates the shape. The base of the building is clad in grey granite, and the walls above are limestone. Art Deco detailing is scattered throughout the building.

The Greater Penobscot is the last and largest of the three Penobscot Buildings, and, at 557 feet, was for a brief time the fourth-tallest building in the world. Even so, for fifty years, until the 1977 Renaissance Center was built, the Penobscot was the tallest building in Detroit. In the 1920s, the building housed the offices of the Guardian Detroit Group, along with their subsidiary banking interests. In the 1930s and 40s, Manufacturer's National Bank of Detroit occupied second-floor space. In the new millennium, the Penobscot stands as a state of the art class-A office building and serves as a hub for the city's wireless Internet zone and fiber-optic communication network.

=== New Penobscot Building (140–150 W. Congress) (1916) ===
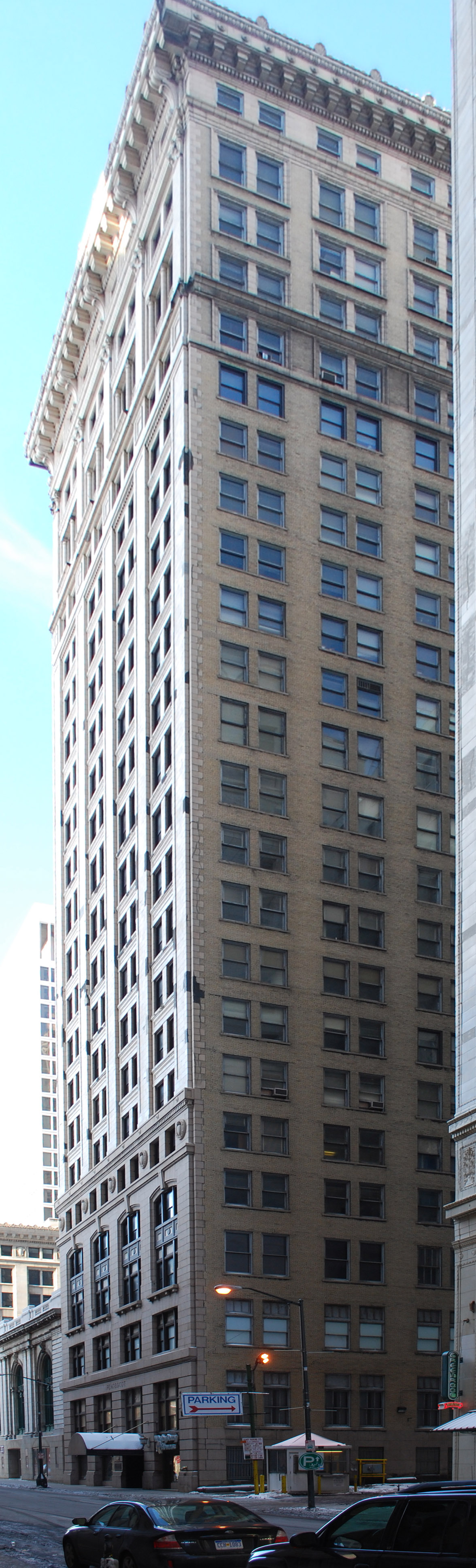

42°19′47″N 83°2′52″W

The New Penobscot Building, a 24-story, flat-roofed building, designed in 1916 by Donaldson and Meier as a second phase of the next-door Penobscot Building. The New Penobscot fronts on West Congress and extends rearward to meet the original Penobscot Building at the alley. The New Penobscot features a Renaissance-inspired theme, with the lower five stories faced with grey granite, and the upper section faced with lighter terra cotta and ashlar. The lower section of the facade contains broad triple windows; the upper part has pairs of double-hung windows. The top four stories are separated from the lower floors by a band of terra cotta with blind reliefs. The entrance is flanked by retail shop windows, and more retail shops are located in the first-floor interior.

=== Penobscot Building (131 W. Fort) (1906) ===
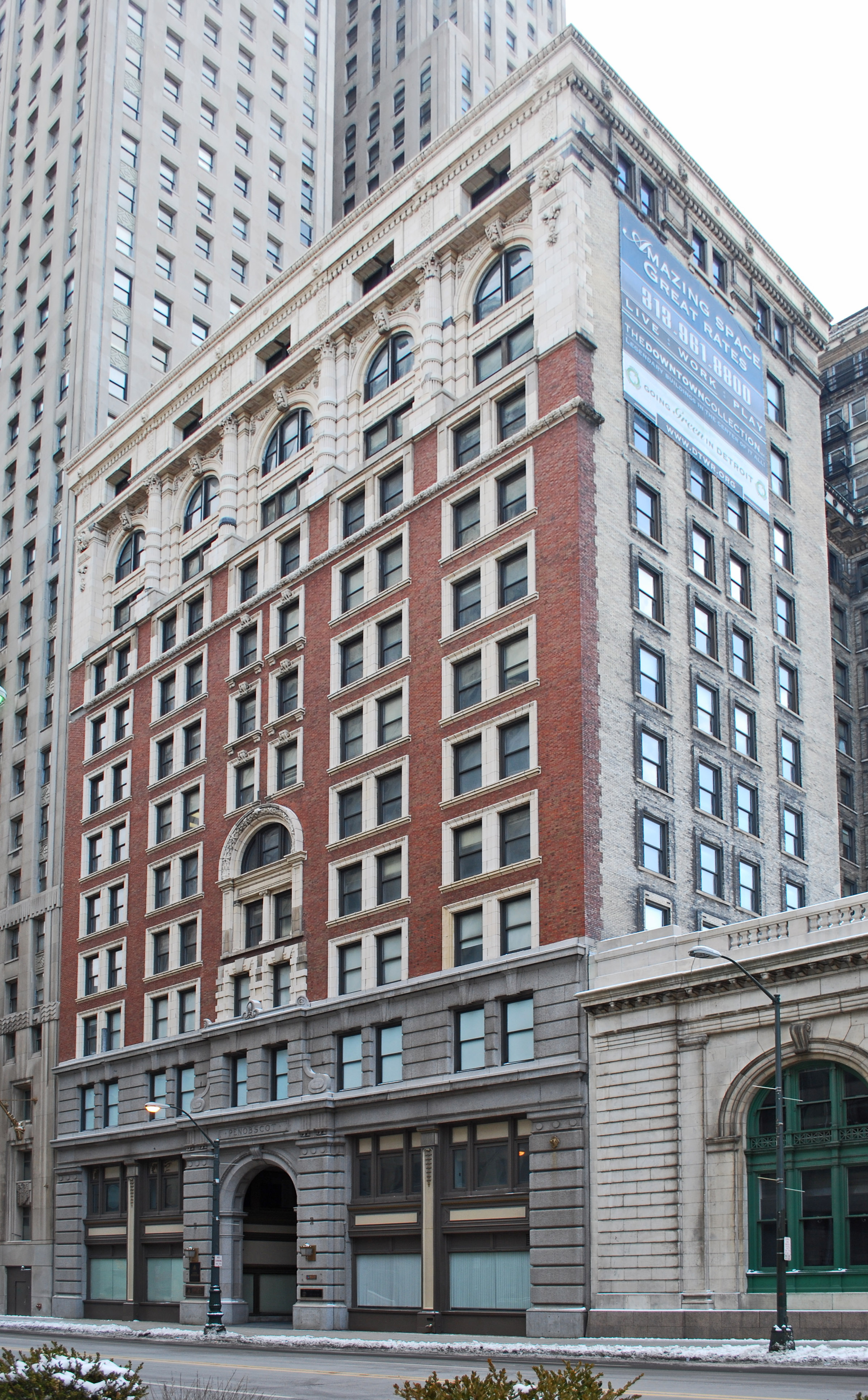

42°19′48.5″N 83°2′53.2″W

The Penobscot Building on Fort Street is a thirteen-story office tower of brick, terra cotta, and limestone with a flat roof, in 1905–1906 and designed by Donaldson and Meier. This building was the first of three interconnected Penobscot Buildings constructed for William H. Murphy of the Simon J. Murphy Company. The lower three stories of the building are faced in limestone, the middle seven in brick, and the upper three in terra cotta. The facade is divided into five bays, each with a pair of double-hung windows. Corinthian column piers front the eleventh and twelfth stories, and the original building cornice is still in place. The original tenants of the first floor were the Detroit Savings Bank and the Detroit Trust Company.

=== State Savings Bank Building (151 W. Fort) (1900) ===
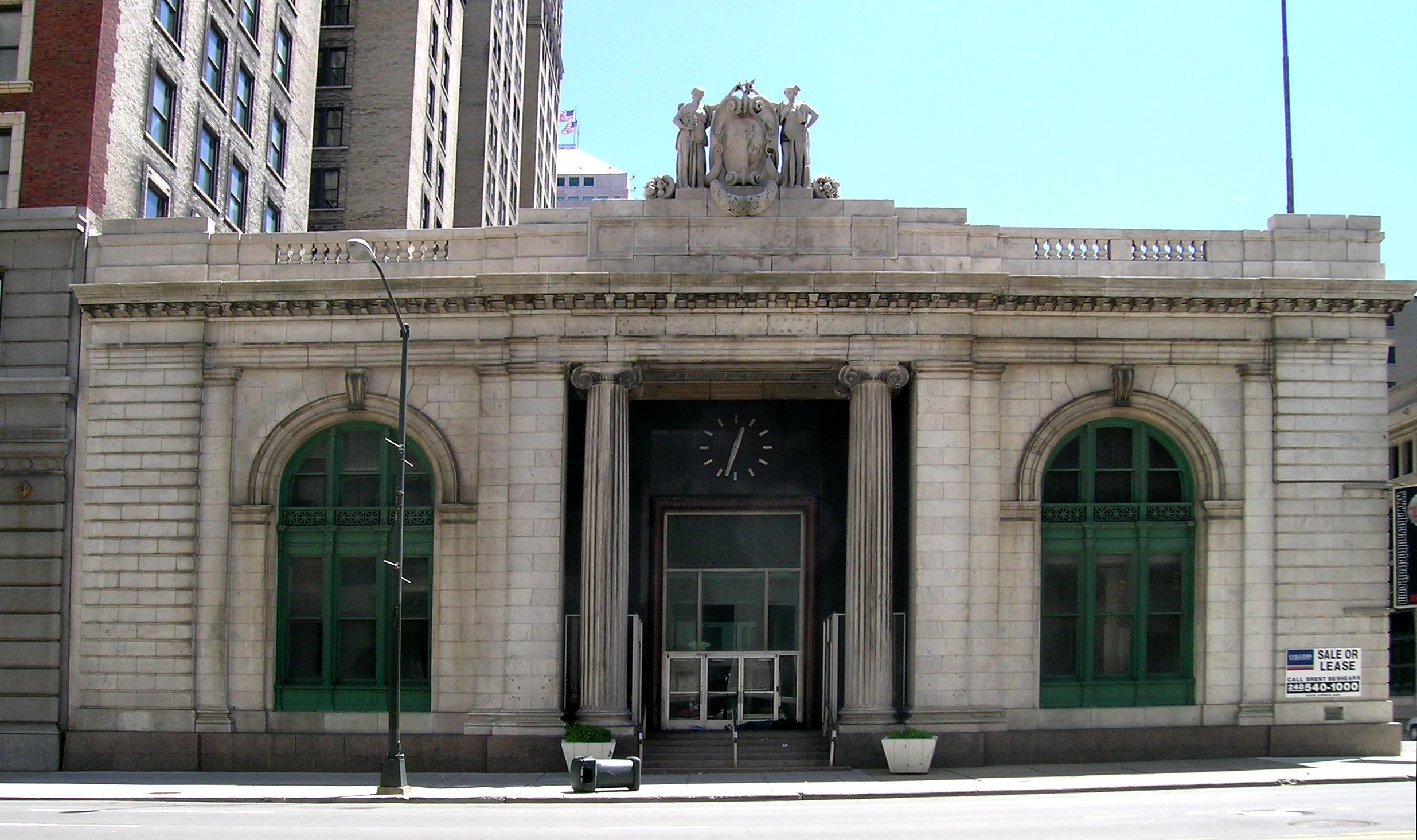

42°19′48″N 83°2′54″W

The State Savings Bank is a 2 1/2-story steel-framed, hipped-roof bank building faced with marble. The structure was built in two portions: the front half of the building was constructed in 1900 and designed by McKim, Mead, and White, and the rear addition was constructed in 1914 by Donaldson and Meier. The State Savings Bank was established in 1883, and in 1907 merged with People's Savings Bank to become the People's State Savings Bank. The merged banks used this structure as their headquarters, but by 1914 had outgrown the space, necessitating the construction of the rear addition.

The front facade is divided into three bays, with a center entrance sheltered by an Ionic portico. An aluminum clock-face is set into the building wall above the entrance. A continuous modillion cornice runs along the top of the building, with a balustrade concealing the low hipped roof. Bronze window units are set in large arched window openings. The interior includes finely crafted Roman arched colonnades with bronze grill work as well as gold-leaf detail on the ceiling in the main room.

The State Savings Bank failed in 1933, and the building was subsequently used by Manufacturer's National Bank of Detroit, and other commercial interests.

=== Bankers Trust Company Building (205 W. Congress) (1925) ===
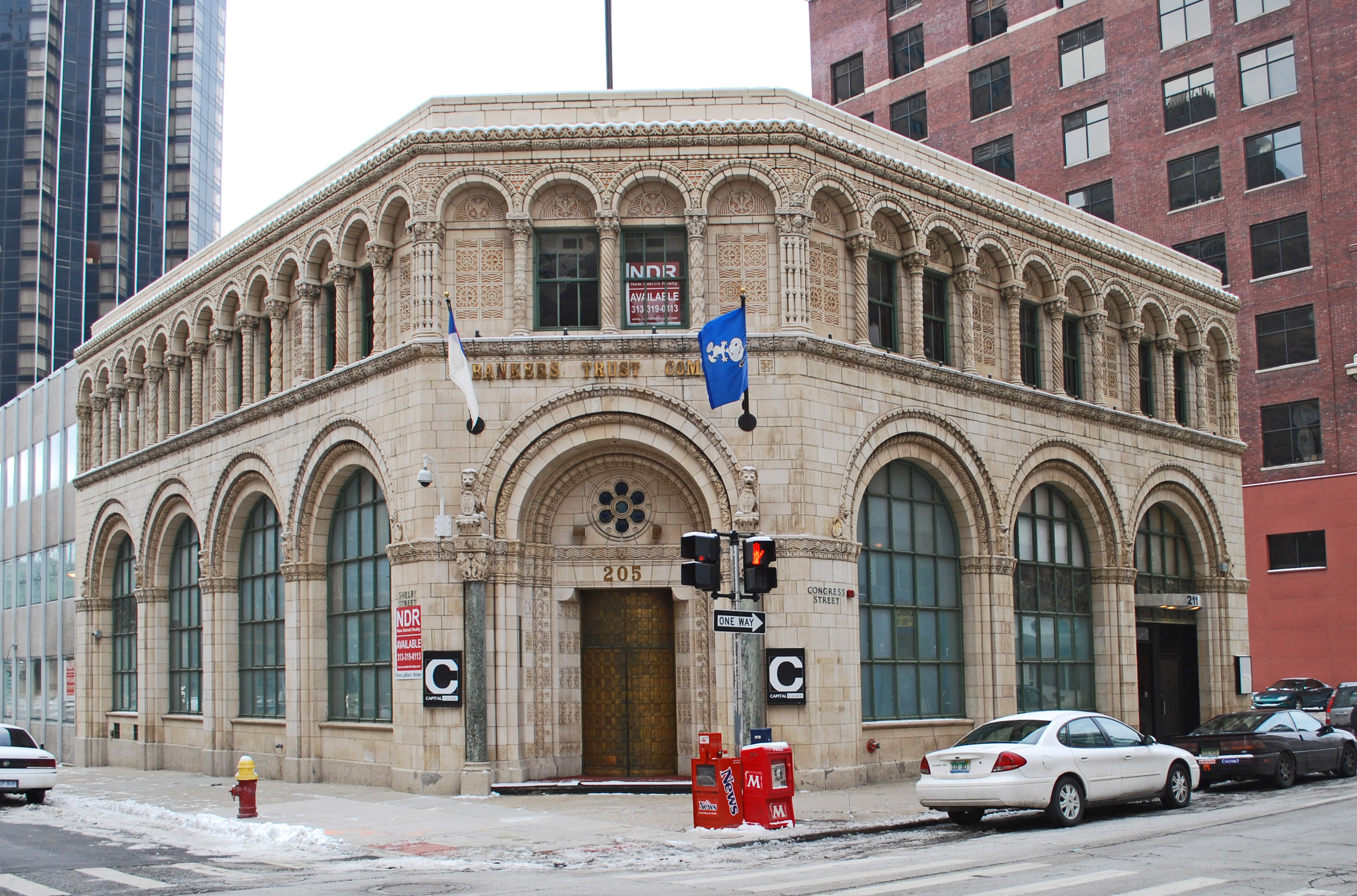

42°19′44″N 83°2′53″W

The Bankers Trust Company Building is a two-story steel-frame building designed in 1925 by Wirt C. Rowland, chief architect for Smith, Hinchman, and Grylls. Bankers Trust Company was founded in 1917, with offices down the street on Congress before constructing this building.

=== Merrill Lynch Building (555 Shelby) (1960) ===
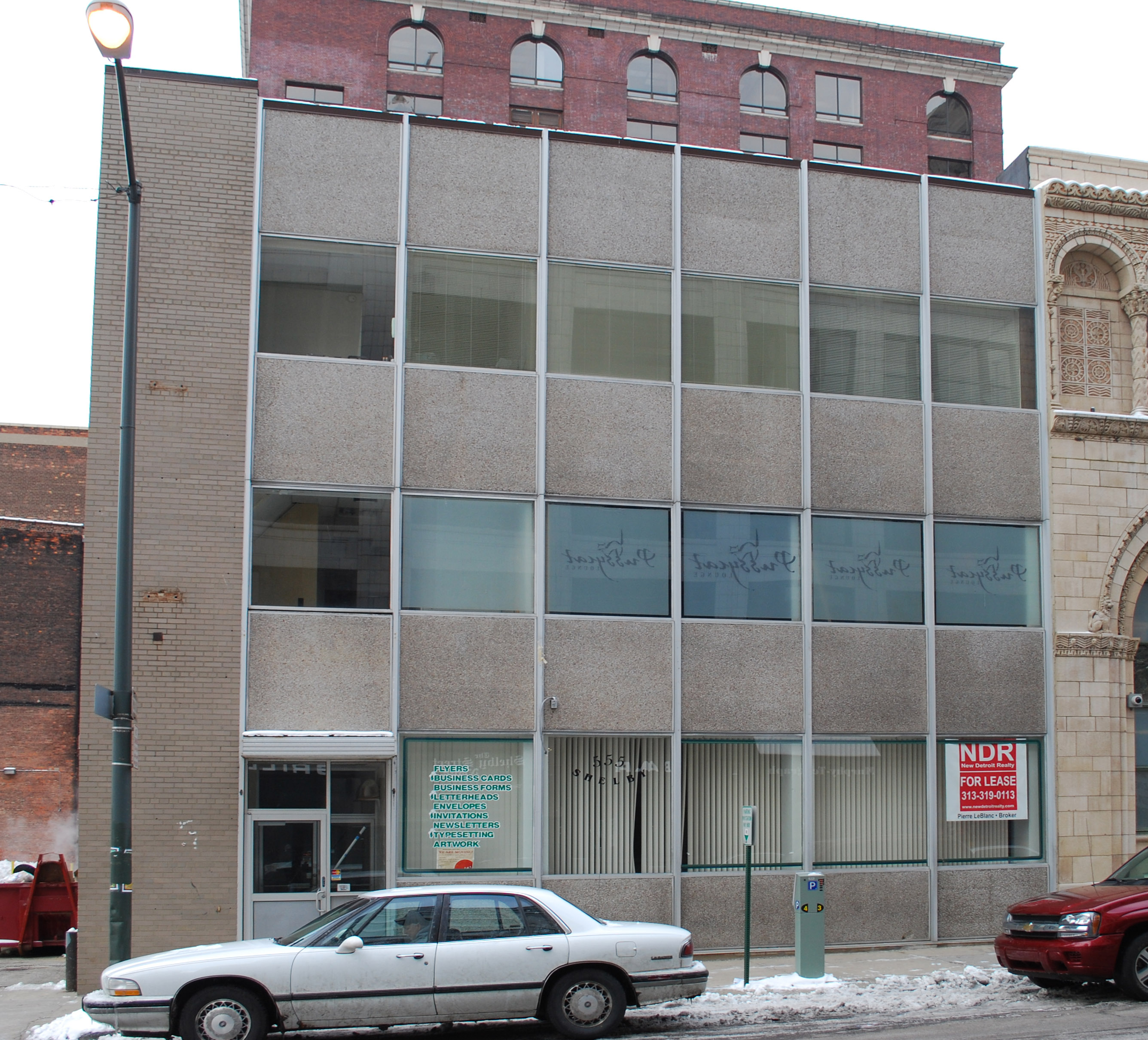

42°19′43.7″N 83°2′52.7″W

The Merrill Lynch Building is a three-story commercial building with steel frame and plate glass windows. The building was constructed in 1960 in the International Style, as an annex to the nearby Banker's Trust Company Building, which at the time housed a Merrill Lynch brokerage.

=== Marquette Building (243 W. Congress) (1906) ===
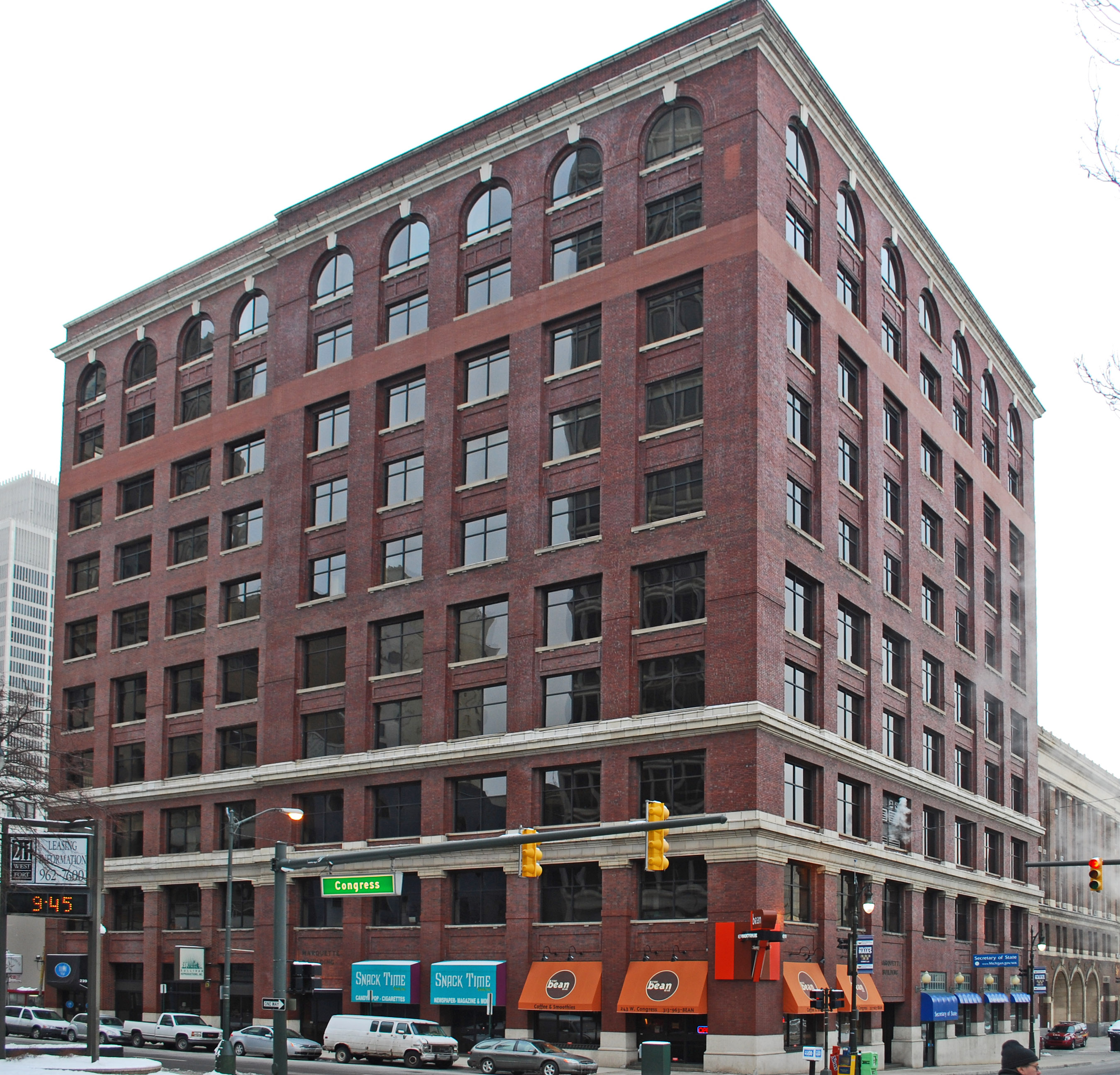

42°19′43.5″N 83°2′55″W

The Marquette Building was originally constructed in 1906 for businessman Simon J. Murphy; substantial renovations were performed in 1916. The building is a ten-story steel-framed office building with a flat roof and faced with red brick, fronting on Congress Street and Washington Boulevard. Cast stone is placed at the base of the building, and bands of terra cotta separate the second and third, and the third and fourth floors. "Marquette Building" is applied in metal letters above the main doors.

=== US Mortgage Bond Building (607 Shelby) (1925) ===
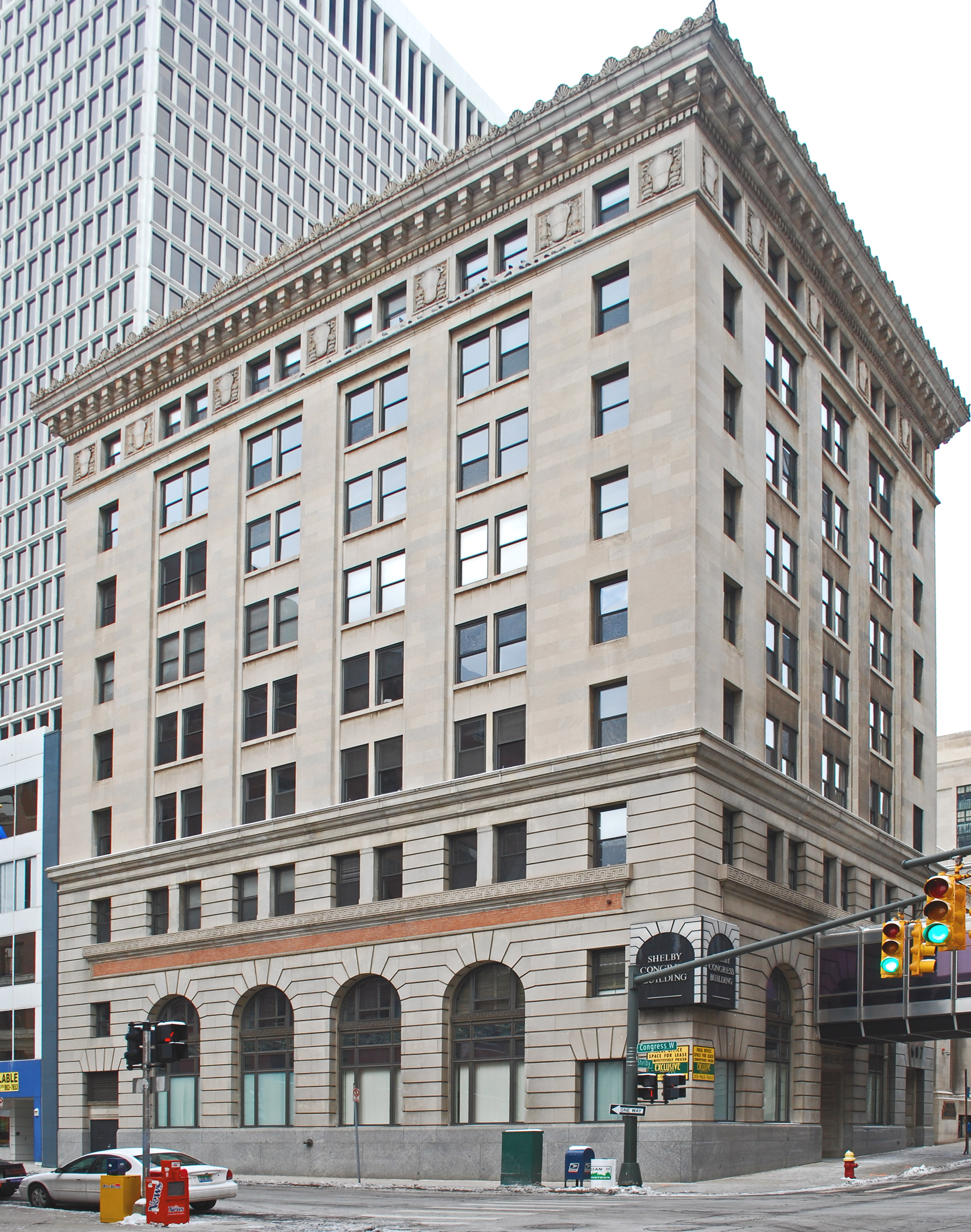

42°19′45.5″N 83°2′54″W

The US Mortgage Bond Building is a nine-story office building faced with gray limestone and brick. The building was constructed in 1924-25 for the United States Mortgage Bond Company, organized ten years earlier in 1915. The design mixes Italian palazzo, Neoclassical, and Renaissance Revival influences. The lower three stories of the building are finished in broad courses of limestone; the upper floors, finished in smoother limestone, are separated from the lower by a cornice. There are five window bays on the Shelby facade and six on the Congress facade. At some point in the middle 20th century, a pedestrian bridge was built connecting the building to the State Savings Bank across the street.

=== Detroit Fire and Marine Insurance Company Building (625 Shelby) (1912) ===
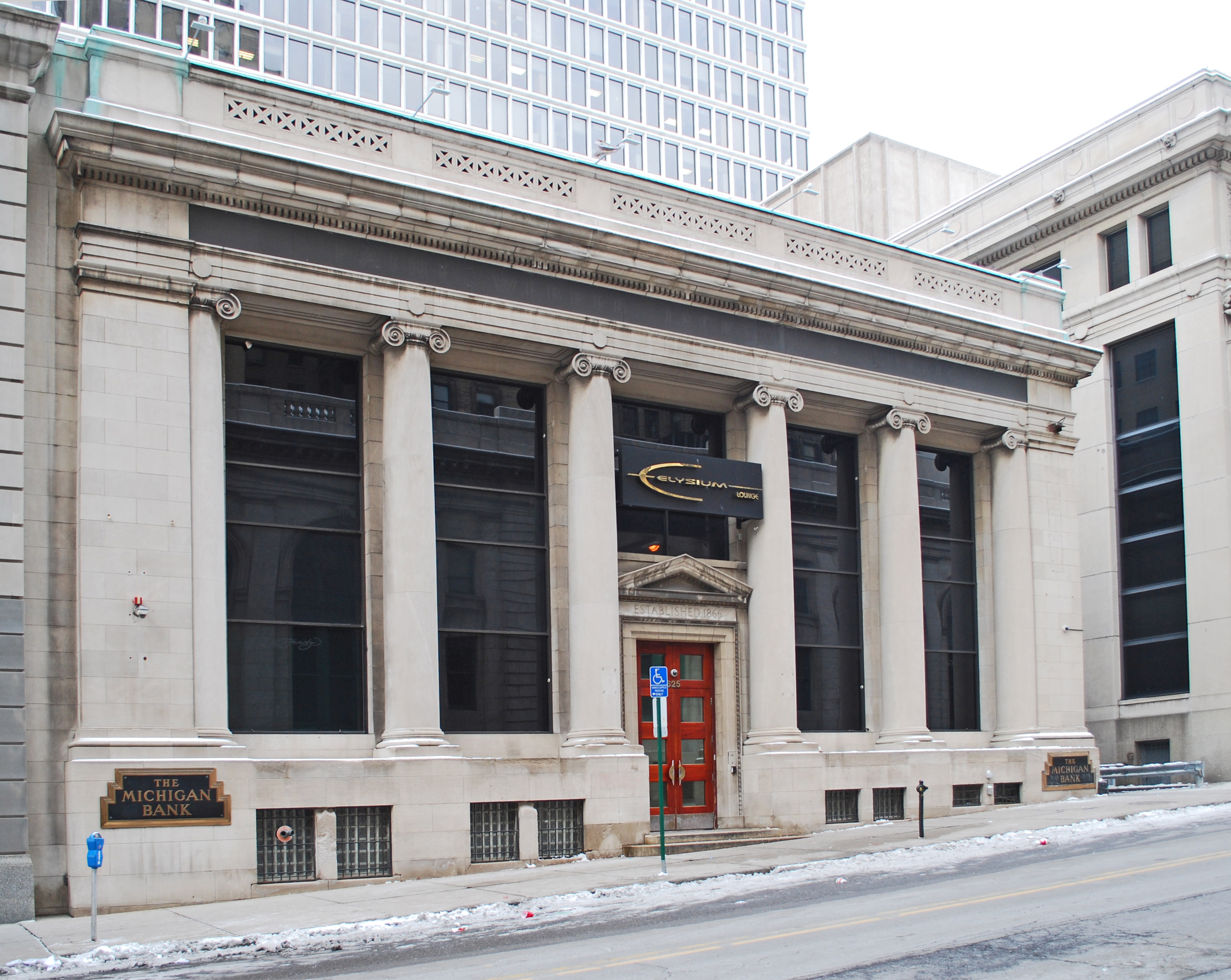

42°19′46″N 83°2′54.5″W

The Detroit Fire and Marine Insurance Company Building is a two-story limestone and brick bank building constructed in 1912. The Detroit Fire and Marine Insurance Company was established in 1866.

The facade of this building has four Ionic columns, plus a half-column at each end. The main entrance is between the two central columns, and the window areas between the columns are now filled with dark glass. An entablature, cornice, and balustrade span the top of the building.

=== 220 W. Congress (1920) ===
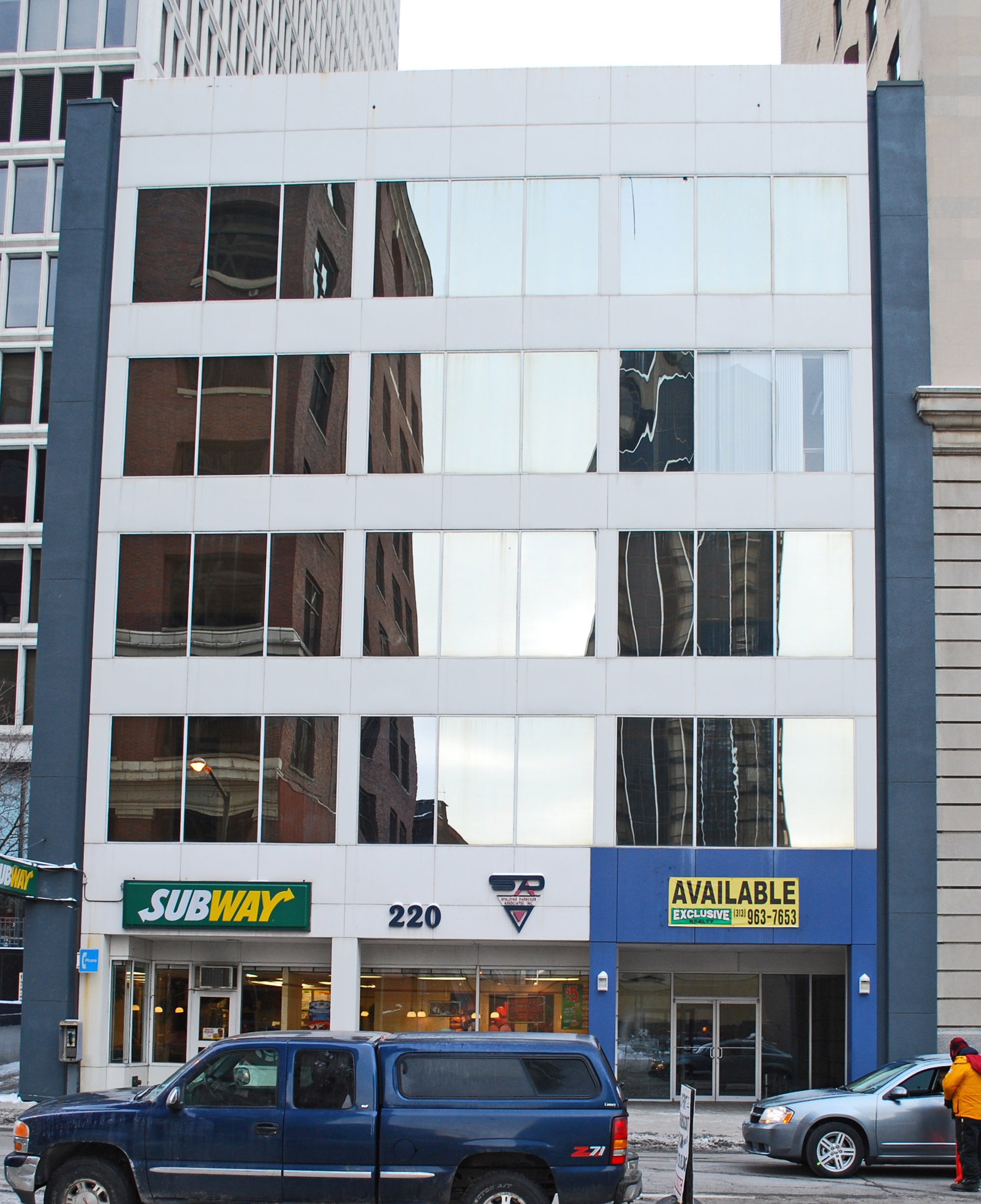

42°19′45″N 83°2′55″W

The building at 220 W Congress is a steel, five-story office building built in 1920. It was completely renovated in 1970, adding a front facade of blue- and cream-colored steel with dark glass. In 2017–2020, the building went through a major renovation that included gutting the building and providing a lot of core and shell build outs. Venture X Detroit - Financial District, a private office, flex space, coworking business, leases three of the five floors with its Class A build out.

=== Detroit Trust Company Building (201 W. Fort) (1915) ===
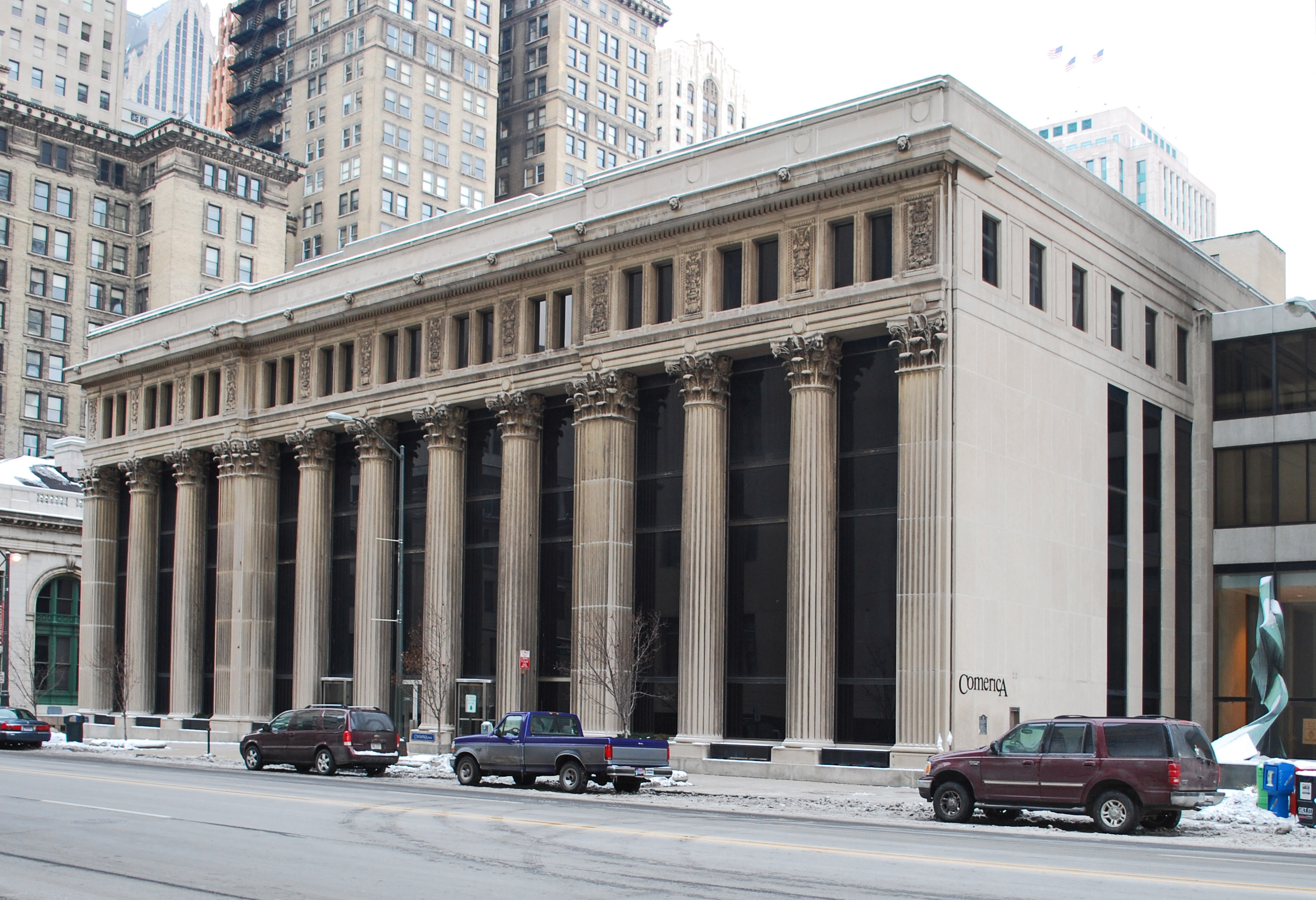

42°19′47″N 83°2′56″W

The Detroit Trust Company Building is a 2 1/2-story steel-framed bank building originally constructed in 1915 by Albert Kahn. The Detroit Trust Company was founded in 1900; it occupied space in the nearby Penobscot Building before moving into this building. In 1925, Kahn designed a substantial addition, tripling the frontage on Fort Street.

The building is Neoclassical in design, with eight Corinthian pillars and four similar pilasters arranged across the facade. Kahn's design for this building was influenced by McKim, Mead, and White's nearby State Savings Bank. A series of windows interspersed by plaques with foliated details are set in the attic story. The building was modernized in 1964, and the front section between the columns was rebuilt.

The Detroit Trust Company merged with Detroit Bank in the 1950s to form the Detroit Bank and Trust Company, and built the next-door tower at 211 W. Fort. The company changed its name to Comerica Bank in 1982; this building is still an office of Comerica.

=== Detroit Bank and Trust Tower (211 W. Fort) (1963) ===
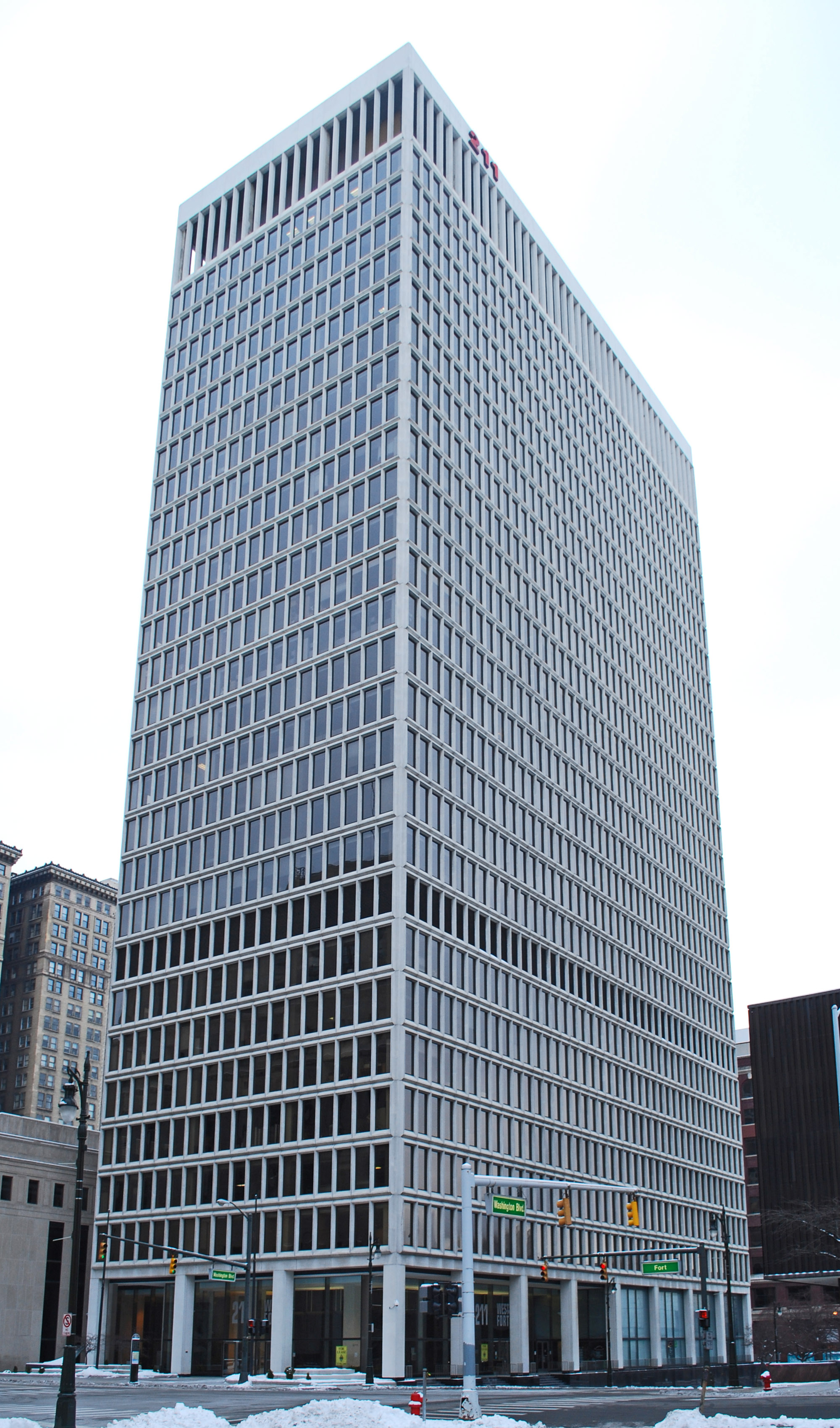

42°19′46″N 83°2′57″W

The Detroit Bank and Trust Tower is a steel-frame 28-story tower designed in 1963 by Harley, Ellington, Cowan, and Stirton for Detroit Bank and Trust (now Comerica Bank). The pre-cast concrete forms filled with glass give the building a grid-like appearance. This building does not contribute to the district, but only because it is less than 50 years old.

=== Chrysler House (719 Griswold) (1912) ===
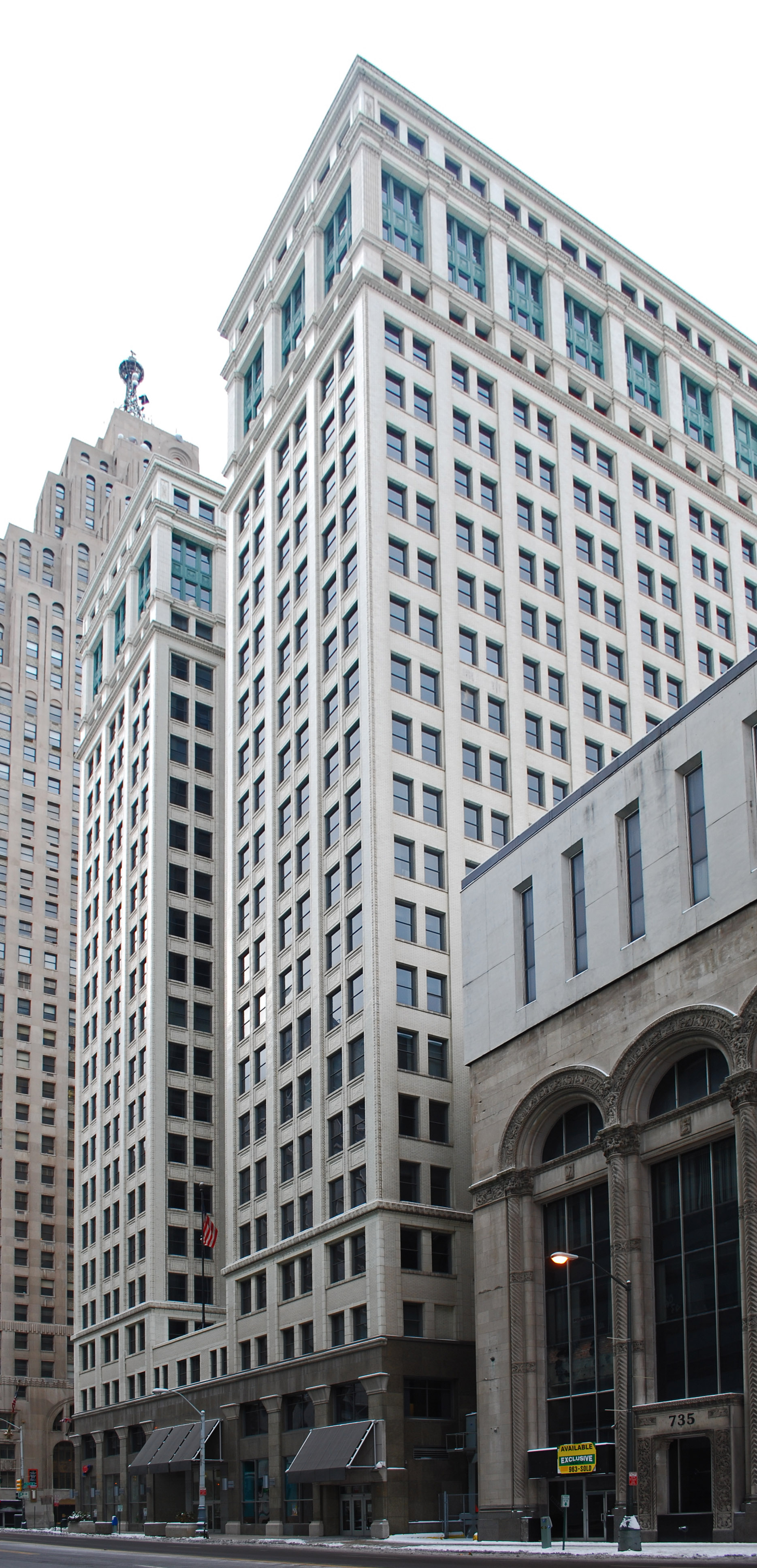
Dime Savings Bank Building Detroit MI

42°19′51″N 83°2′53″W

The landmark Neoclassical skyscraper that has become the Chrysler House was built in 1912 by D. H. Burnham & Company. The building is a 23-story flat-roofed skyscraper with a U-shaped footprint, with the open end toward Griswold Street. The Dime Savings Bank, as it was originally known, was organized in 1884 by a group of Detroit businessmen including J. L. Hudson and James E. Scripps; their offices were originally on Griswold north of Lafayette. They later moved to the Hammond Building, where they stayed until this structure was built.

The most notable feature of the facade is the light well along the front facade; unlike Burhham's nearby Ford Buildings where the well is invisible from the front, the light well of the Dime Building faces Griswold. The lower two floors of the building are clad in brown granite that was applied during a 1950s renovation; the upper floors are clad in the original terra cotta. The upper three stories are differeintialed from the main body of the building by a different window treatment. The building that has become Chrysler House was fully renovated in 2002, including an impressive treatment of the skylight opening up to the light well.

The Dime Savings Bank originally occupied a three-story banking room in the center of the building and used the upper floors for office space.

=== Federal Reserve Bank of Chicago Detroit Branch Building (160 W. Fort) (1923) ===
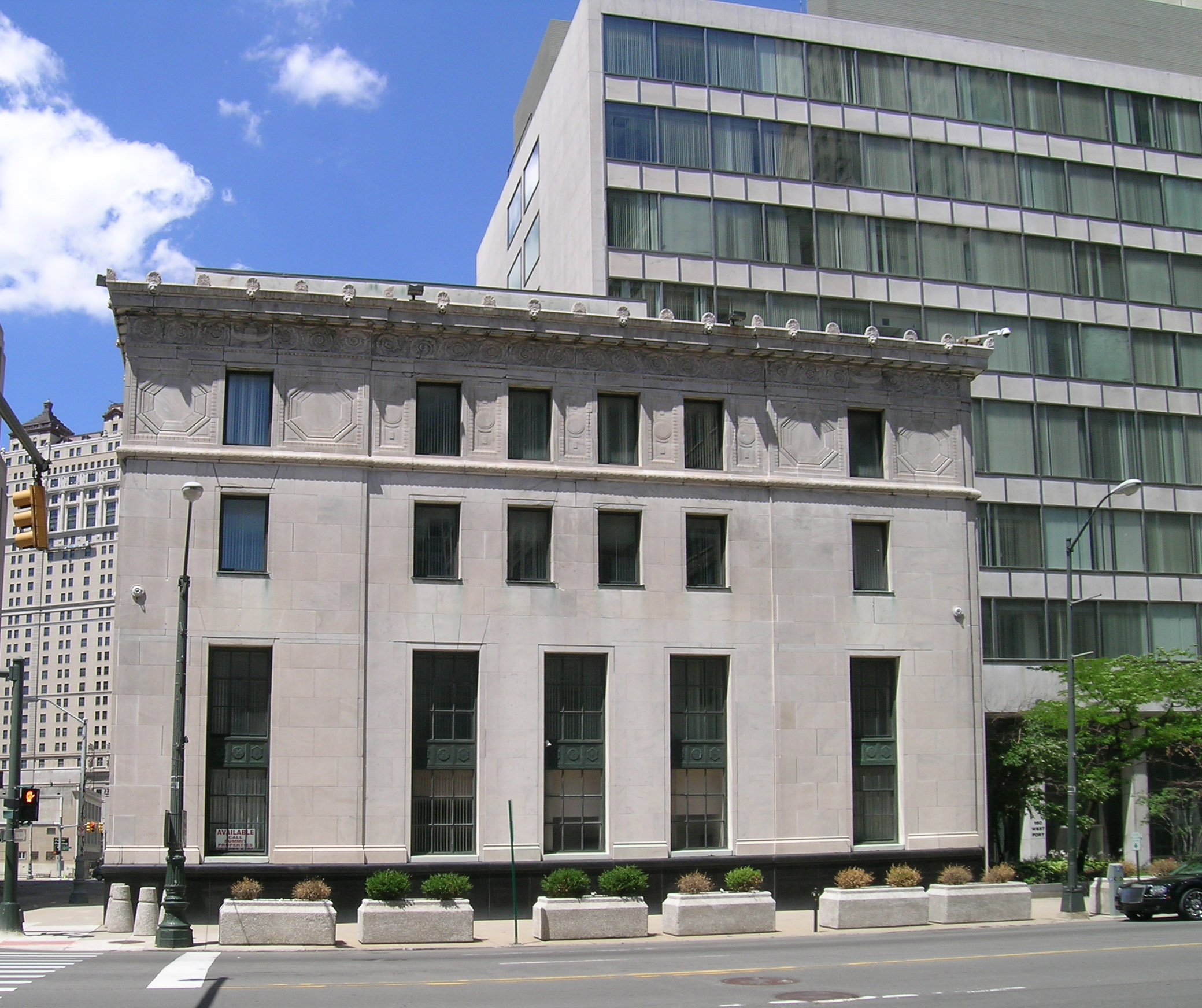

42°19′50″N 83°2′55″W

The Federal Reserve Bank of Chicago Detroit Branch consists of two parts: a 3 1/2-story Neoclassical marble bank building built in 1923 and an eight-story International style annex built in 1949–1951. The original building was designed by Graham, Anderson, Probst, & White; the addition (and later renovation) was done by Minoru Yamasaki. Yamasaki's bold addition was on the leading edge of Modern architecture.

The floor plates of the two buildings are aligned, as the interior of the original building was gutted with the annex was built.

=== Security Trust Company Building (735 Griswold) (1925) ===
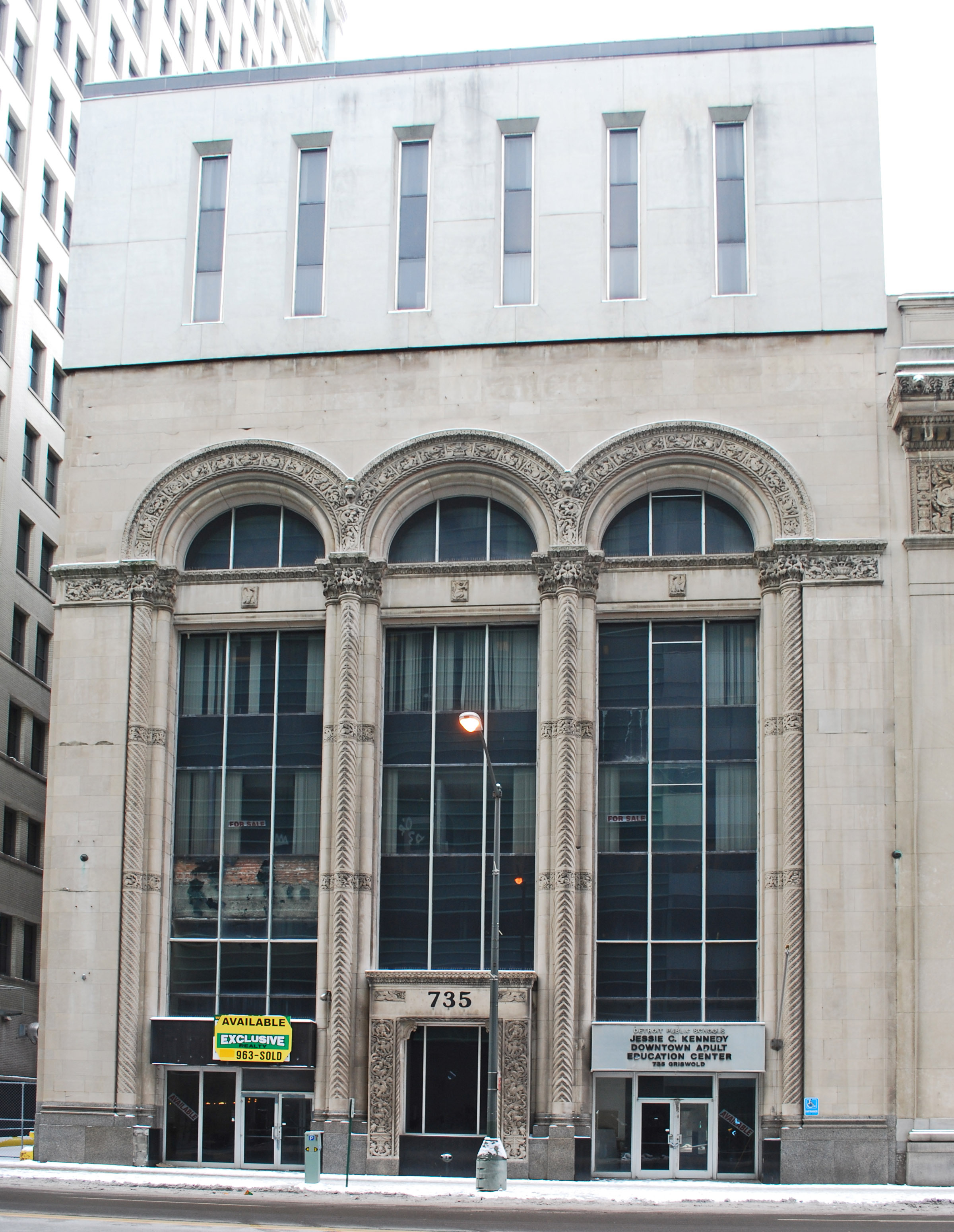

42°19′52″N 83°2′53.5″W

The Security Trust Company is a seven-story bank building with a steel frame faced with limestone. The building was designed by Albert Kahn and erected in 1925. Security Trust was established in 1906, and two years later moved to the corner of Griswold and Fort Streets, just south of where this building was constructed.

The front facade has columns flanking three four-story tall arches. The columns are finished with elaborately carved human and animal motifs. In 1964, the original gable atop the building was removed and a two-story flat-roofed addition was placed atop the building. The addition is clad with cast concrete panels.

=== First State Bank Building (751 Griswold) (1925) ===
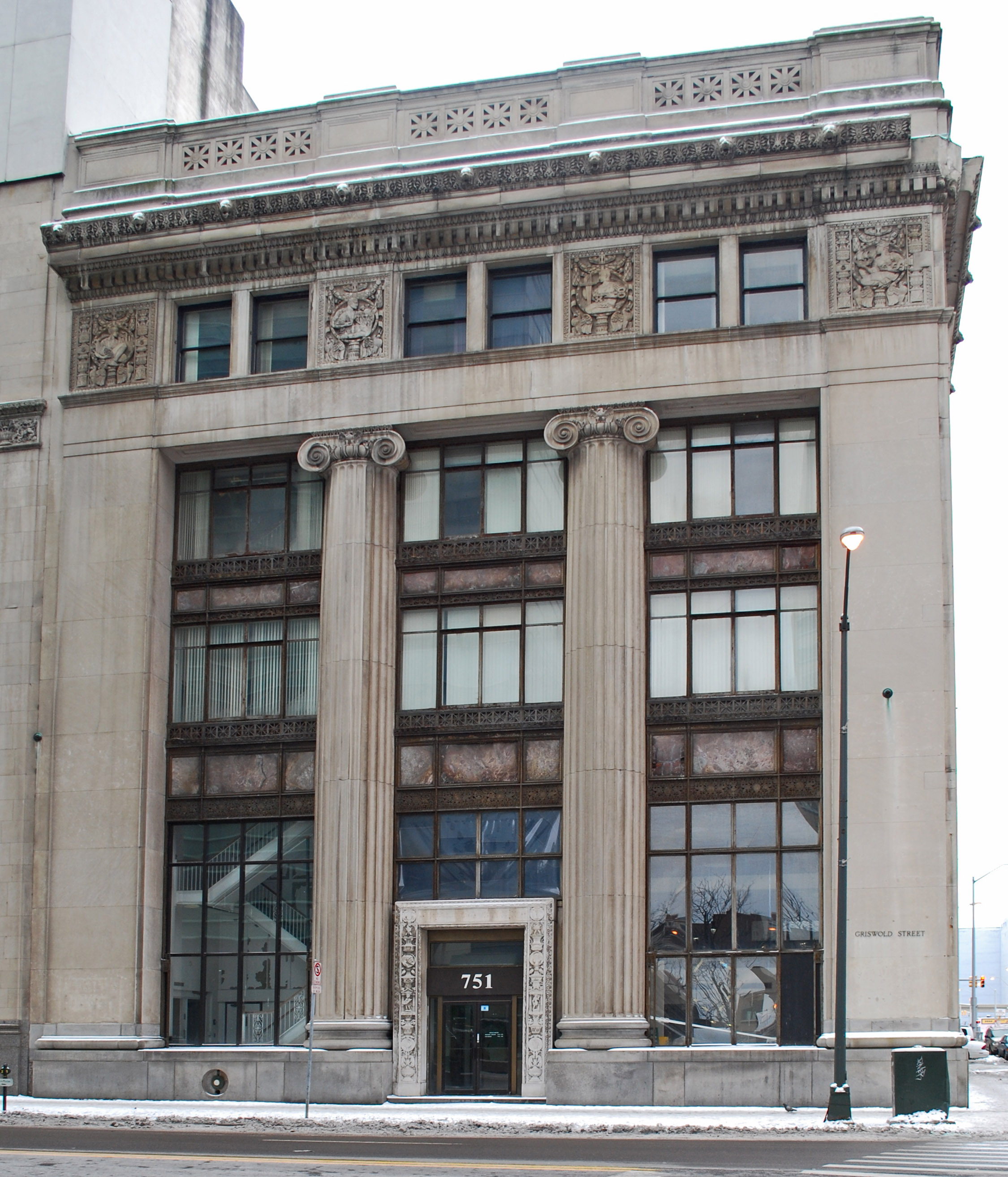

42°19′52.5″N 83°2′54″W

The First State Bank Building is a four-story, flat-roofed bank building with a steel frame faced with limestone. The building was designed by Albert Kahn and erected in 1924–25. First State Bank began life in 1871 as the "German American Bank" with offices on Larned; the bank moved at least twice more before building this structure.

The main entrance of the building is surrounded with carved marble depicting urns, animals, and foliage. The building is located at the corner of Griswold and Lafayette Streets, and has decorative facades facing both streets. Each facade has three-story Ionic columns supporting the attic story, on the upper story, double-hung windows are grouped in pairs, separated by elaborate plaques. A parapet runs across the roofline.

=== Theodore Levin United States Courthouse (231 W. Lafayette) (1934) ===
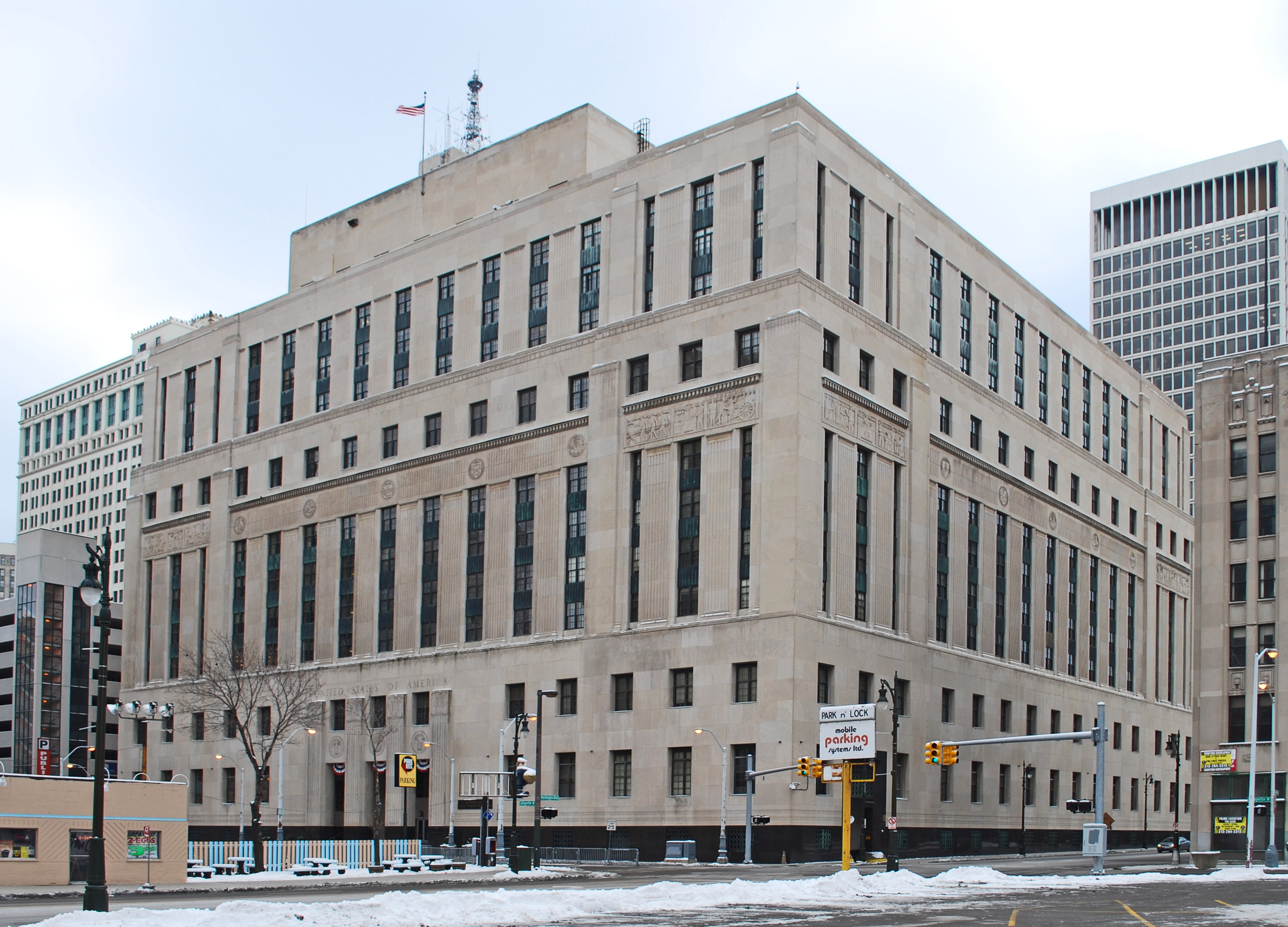
Theodore Levin United States Courthouse Detroit MI

42°19′49″N 83°2′58.5″W

The Theodore Levin United States Courthouse is a ten-story federal courthouse, steel-framed and clad in limestone. The building was constructed in 1932–34, and designed by Branson V. Gambler and Robert O. Derrick. It stands on an entire city block. The building stands on a black granite base, and relief carvings of eagles and other symbols are above the entrance. The upper three stories are set back slightly from the remainder of the building. The interior of the building features fine detailing and plaster stencilwork.

=== Detroit Free Press Building (321 W. Lafayette) (1925) ===
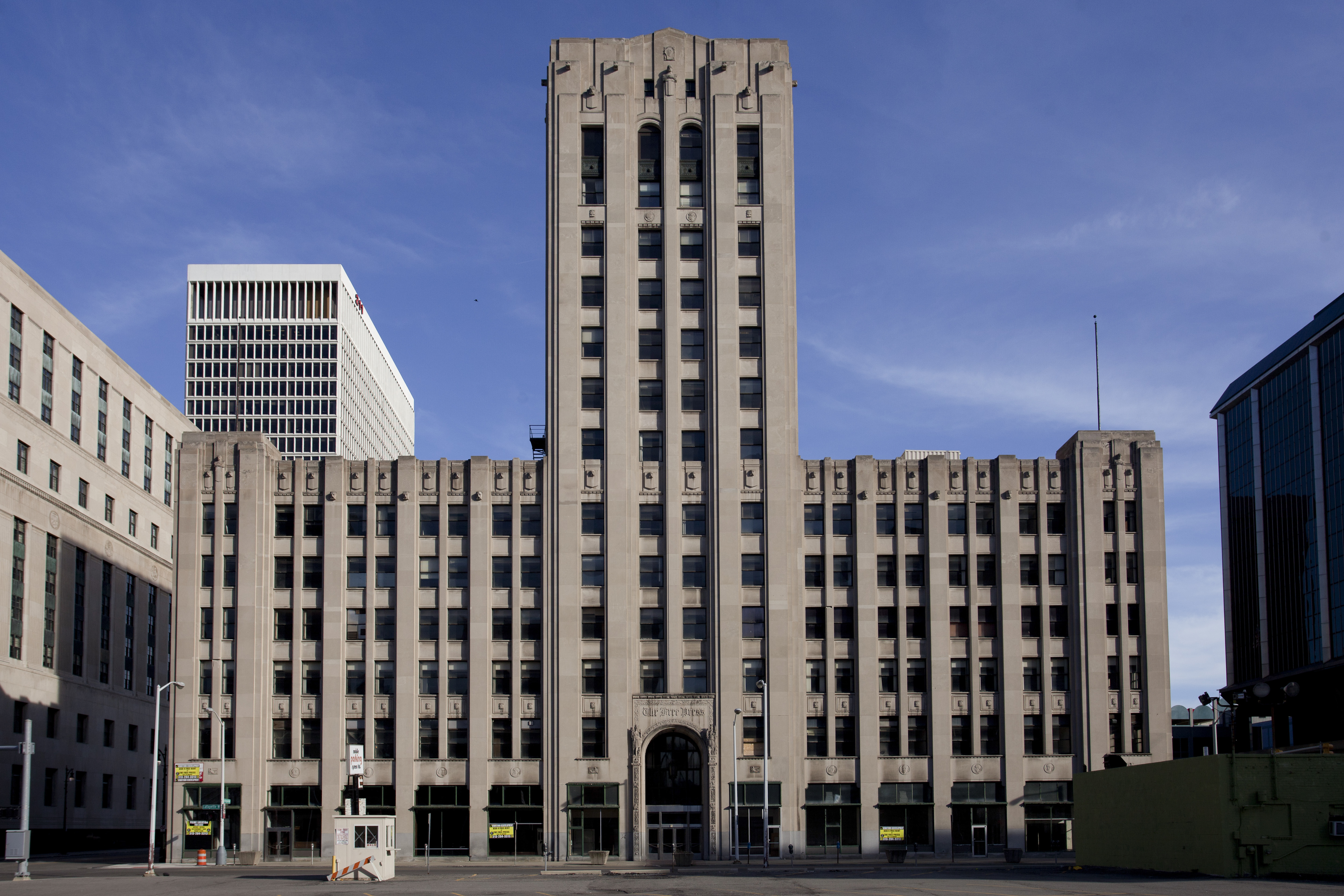
Detroit Free Press Building 2011 05 08

42°19′48″N 83°3′3″W

The Detroit Free Press Building is a fourteen-story flat-roofed building with a steel frame faced with limestone. The building was designed by Albert Kahn and erected in 1925. The building is designed using the then-popular technique of a central mass with six-story wings to each side. On the exterior, medallions inset into the building depict historical newsmen. A restaurant and other retail spaces are located on the Lafayette Boulevard facade.

== See also ==
- Griswold Street
- List of buildings located along Woodward Avenue, Detroit
