= Charles Stewart Mott Foundation Building =

High rise building in Flint, Michigan

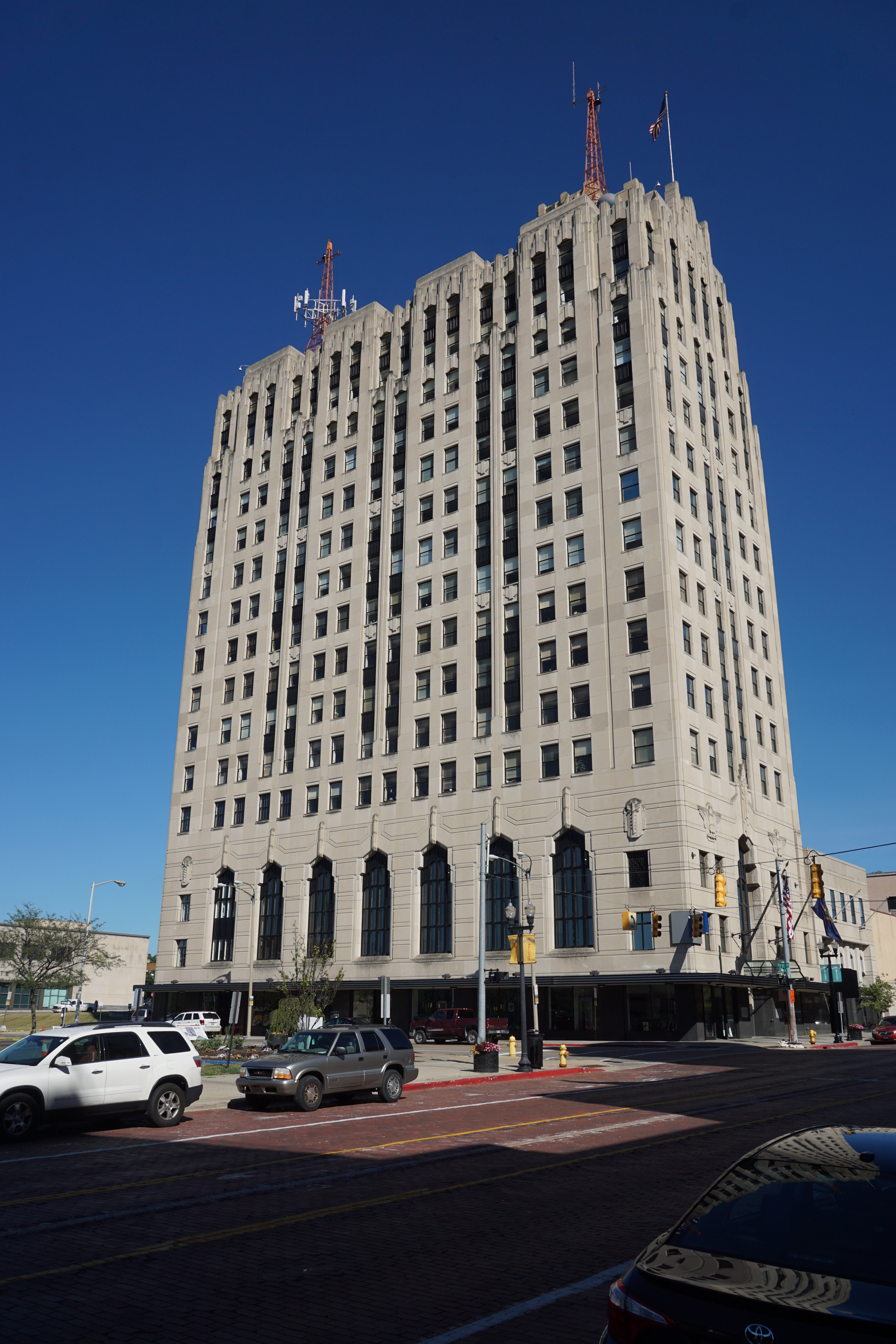
- Charles Stewart Mott Foundation Building viewed from Saginaw Street

- Location within Michigan
- Former names: Union Industrial Bank Building

General information
- Type: Office building
- Architectural style: Art Deco
- Location: Flint, Michigan, United States
- Coordinates: 43°0′57.5″N 83°41′24.8″W
- Construction started: 1929
- Completed: 1930
- Inaugurated: December 15, 1930
- Owner: Charles Stewart Mott Foundation

Technical details
- Floor count: 16

Design and construction
- Architect: Wirt C. Rowland of Smith, Hinchman & Grylls

The Charles Stewart Mott Foundation Building (formerly the Union Industrial Bank Building) is a 16-story office high-rise building in downtown Flint, Michigan. It is the tallest building in the city. Designed by Wirt C. Rowland in 1928 and opened in 1930, it was built as the Union Industrial Bank Building to serve as the headquarters for Union Industrial Bank. Rowland was considered innovative for his use of two materials in the building's construction: Nirosta (a type of stainless steel) for decorative purposes in the public spaces and aluminum for its storefronts and window frames.

In 1944, Charles Stewart Mott bought the building, which has since served as the Charles Stewart Mott Foundation's headquarters and been renamed the Charles Stewart Mott Foundation Building. More recently, the building has appeared in the films Semi-Pro and All's Faire in Love. It is considered one of the most iconic structures in downtown Flint.

== Background ==
Industrial Savings Bank of Flint, Michigan, was founded in 1909. Throughout its history, it had prominent connections with the city's financial and business leaders: Charles Stewart Mott served as its president while Walter Chrysler was a director who was actively involved with its management. Industrial Savings Bank had become the largest bank in the city by 1928, and had outgrown its current headquarters, which had been built in 1923. Furthermore, it had an impending merger with Union Trust and Savings Bank, scheduled for May 1, 1929.

== Design and construction ==
The Union Industrial Bank Building was designed in 1928 by Wirt C. Rowland, working for the Smith, Hinchman & Grylls firm, to serve as an office building as well as the headquarters for Union Industrial Bank. Designed in the Art Deco style, the building measures 16 stories tall. It is located at the corner of Saginaw Street and First Street in downtown Flint, and its street address is 503 South Saginaw Street.

As the Guardian Building and the Penobscot Building, two Detroit buildings that he had largely designed, were nearing completion, Rowland was able to apply his innovative ideas from those projects to the Union Industrial Bank Building in Flint. The most innovative part of the Union Industrial Bank Building's design was Rowland's use of Nirosta (a type of stainless steel) for decorative purposes in the building's public spaces, most notably its banking hall and lobbies. Nirosta, which was a product of Krupp Steel Works of Germany, was easier to work and less expensive than Monel metal, which Rowland had employed similarly on the Guardian Building.

On the exterior of the building, Rowland used black enamel-finished aluminum for all exterior metal, which included grilles, spandrels, storefronts, and window frames. The use of aluminum for storefronts and window frames was considered innovative at the time. The black color was chosen to contrast with the appearance of the relatively light-colored limestone cladding that formed the exterior of the building. Taking cues from his designs for both the Guardian Building and the Penobscot Building, Rowland alternated light bands with dark spandrels around the building's windows to separate them visually into groups, while similarly alternating between recessed and projecting bays on the building's 15th and 16th floors.

The second floor of the building consists entirely of a large banking lobby, measuring 66 feet (20 m) by 38 feet (12 m), that is somewhat similar in appearance to its larger counterpart in the Guardian Building. The banking lobby also featured a novel noise-reducing acoustical product from the Johns-Manville Company that is made of canvas and felt.

The Union Industrial Bank Building also prominently features geometric shapes used as decorative motifs, including a hexagon pattern for the ceilings of the first-floor lobby and the basement safe deposit vault lobby as well as angled arches throughout the building. These geometric decorations, which appear both in the interior and on the exterior of the building, help give it a modern appearance.

While Rowland had essentially completed the design for the building before the end of 1928, the pending merger of Industrial Savings Bank with Union Trust and Savings caused a delay in work on the project until May 1929, when the merger occurred. The drawings for the building were then completed in August 1929. By October, plans for an additional 17th story and a two-story club on the 16th and 17th floors with dining rooms, lounges, porches, and a library were completed. However, the Wall Street Crash of 1929 and an embezzlement scandal at Union Industrial Bank ultimately convinced the bank's directors to scrap the club proposal and revert to the 16-story design for the building.

During the fall of 1929, demolition of the existing building on the property at 503 South Saginaw Street began. After a little over a year of construction, the Union Industrial Bank Building was opened on December 15, 1930. It would be the last skyscraper that Rowland designed.

== Later history ==
In 1944, Charles Stewart Mott bought the Union Industrial Bank Building for $25,000. It has served as the Charles Stewart Mott Foundation's headquarters since then. On January 1, 1945, the building was renamed the Charles Stewart Mott Foundation Building. Exterior maintenance of the building has been provided by Detroit-based Grunwell–Cashero Company since the 1960s, and it has been done on an annual basis since 1990.

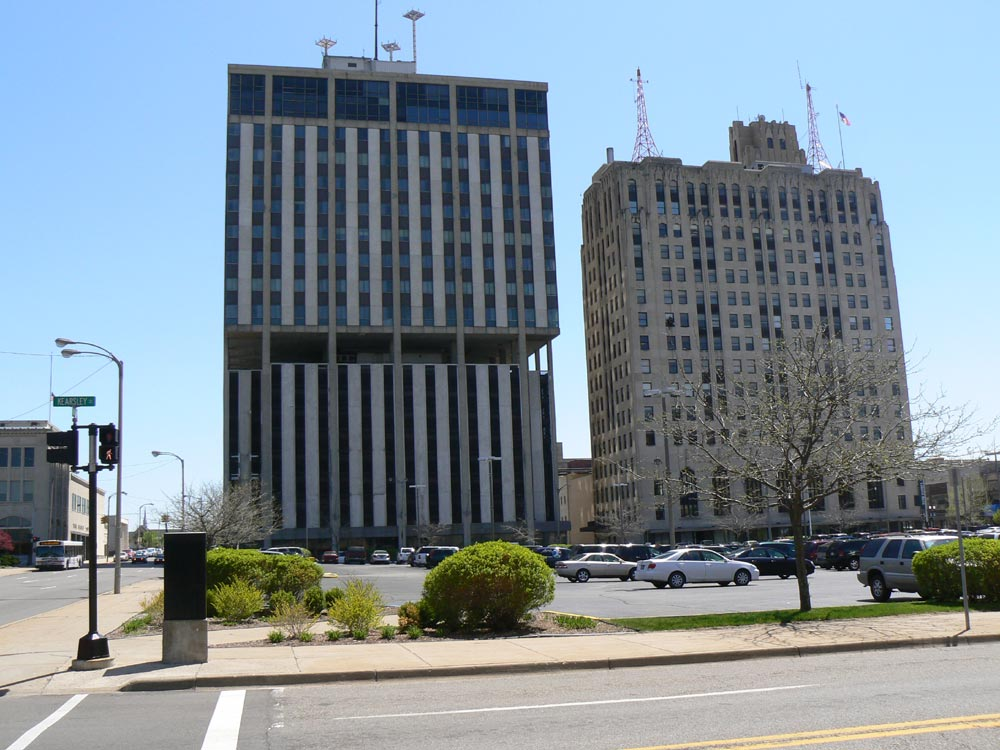
The Mott Foundation Building (right) next to Genesee Towers, circa 2007

The Mott Foundation Building would be the last office high-rise building constructed in downtown Flint until 1968, when Genesee Towers was completed. The two buildings, which were located immediately next to each other, were both close to 250 feet (76 m) in height. When Genesee Towers was slated for demolition in 2013, its proximity to both the Mott Foundation Building and the Flint Journal Building led to the decision to use implosion as the method for bringing it down. After the 2013 implosion of Genesee Towers, which was the tallest building in both the city and Genesee County, the Mott Foundation Building inherited the title of the tallest building in Flint.

In addition to serving as the headquarters of the Charles Stewart Mott Foundation, the building is home to numerous tenants, including those in the legal and financial sectors as well as those that provide other professional services. Other tenants include the Flint and Genesee Chamber of Commerce and a Christian Science Reading Room. The Flint and Genesee Chamber of Commerce occupies Bank of America's former downtown Flint location, which it closed on May 31, 2013. The Mott Foundation Building was also home to the Crim Fitness Foundation until it moved to a new location on Saginaw Street in 2007.

In 2007, a fire on the 14th floor of the Mott Foundation Building caused by a malfunctioning power strip led to the evacuation of the entire building. There were no injuries.

The Mott Foundation Building is home to artwork installed by the Flint Public Art Project. The organization collaborated with Windsor, Ontario-based artist Sohail Azad on a New Year's Eve 2012 light show that included a three-dimensional virtual ball drop.

The building has also been used for press conferences by Flint mayors and Michigan governors, including one by governor Rick Snyder during the Flint water crisis. In April 2009, approximately 30 public-sector and private-sector leaders met at the building for a closed-door session to discuss how to best address the crisis in the automobile industry and its impacts on the area.

== In popular culture and image ==
The Mott Foundation Building made its film debut in the 2008 sports comedy Semi-Pro. A scene from the film was shot in Brush Alley behind the building. Scenes from the 2009 romantic comedy All's Faire in Love were likewise shot at the Mott Foundation Building, which also filmed at Flint's Atwood Stadium and Mott Community College as well as the Michigan Renaissance Festival.

The Mott Foundation Building is considered one of the most iconic structures in downtown Flint, along with the Citizens Bank Building weatherball and the arches over brick-paved Saginaw Street. It is also home to the highest-flying American flag in the city.

== Sources ==
- Holleman, Thomas J.; Gallagher, James P. (1978). Smith, Hinchman & Grylls: 125 Years of Architecture and Engineering, 1853-1978. Wayne State University Press. ISBN 0-5980-7613-1.
- Smith, Michael G. (2017). Designing Detroit: Wirt Rowland and the Rise of Modern American Architecture. Wayne State University Press. ISBN 978-0-8143-3979-4.
