= Detroit Savings Bank Southwest Branch =

- U.S. National Register of Historic Places
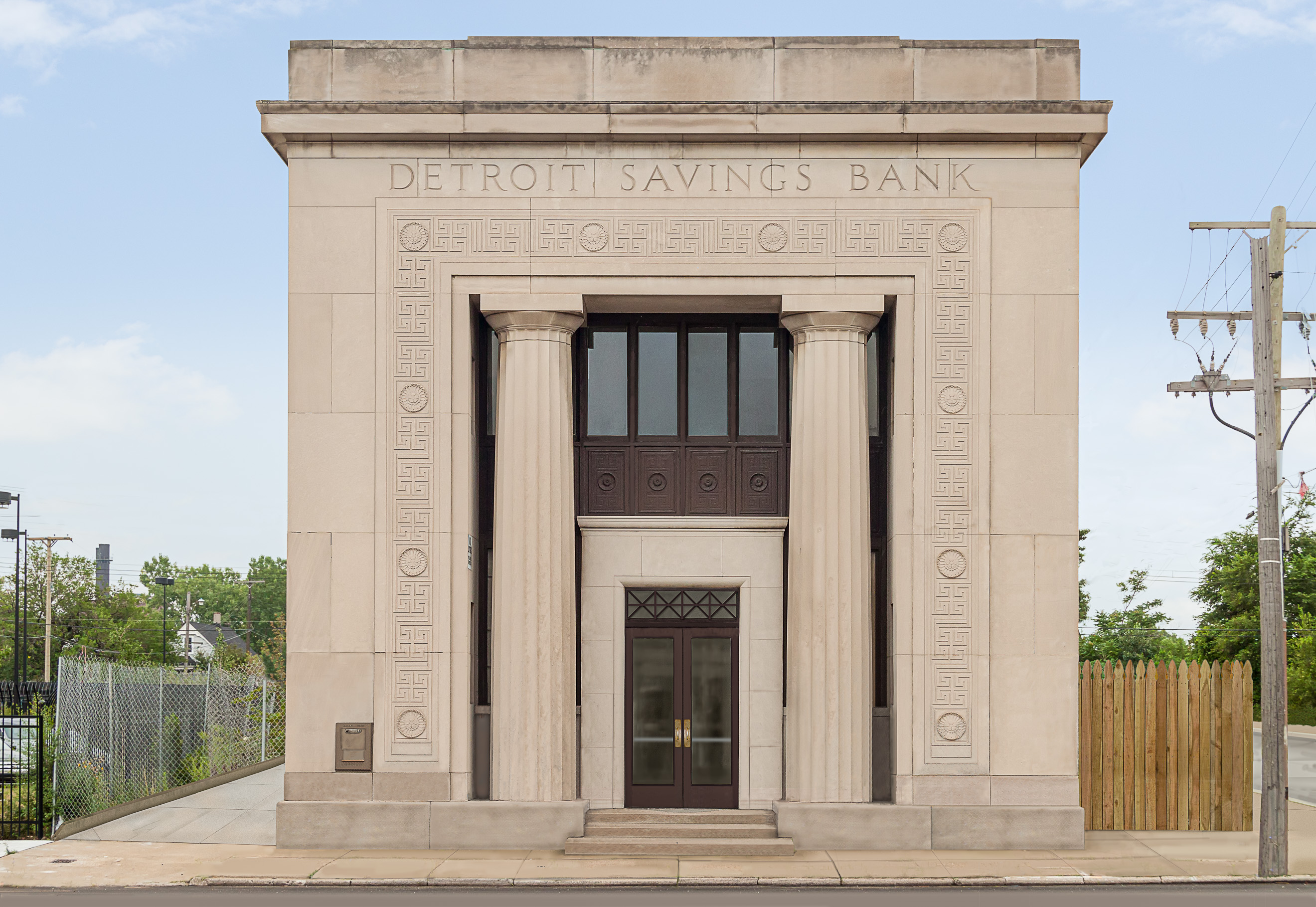
- Interactive map
- Location: 5705 West Fort St. Detroit, Michigan
- Coordinates: 42°18′32″N 83°5′52″W
- Built: 1919; 107 years ago
- Architect: Wirt C. Rowland, Albert Kahn
- Architectural style: Art Deco, Classical Revival
- MPS: Branch Banks in Detroit, Michigan, 1889-1970 MPS
- NRHP reference No.: 100006411
- Added to NRHP: April 16, 2021

The Detroit Savings Bank Southwest Branch is a former branch bank building located at 5705 West Fort Street in Detroit, Michigan. The building is significant as one of the works of Wirt C. Rowland, then working at the firm established by Albert Kahn. It was listed on the National Register of Historic Places in 2021.

== History ==
The Detroit Savings Bank was established in 1849 as the Detroit Savings Fund Institute. The institution grew over the years, and by the 20th century was among the largest banks in Detroit. After the Delray neighborhood was annexed to Detroit and the area began attracting more population, Detroit Savings Bank looked to establish a branch in the neighborhood. In 1913, they purchased a plot of land for a location, but WWI intervened before construction could start. The company eventually hired Albert Kahn's firm to design a building. Construction on the building began in 1919, and it opened in 1920.

Detroit Savings Bank weathered the Great Depression and continued to use the bank building. However, by the 1950s, the Delray neighborhood was losing employment and the population was declining. The branch bank was closed in the 1980s. As of 2014, the building was owned by the nonprofit Community Health and Social Services (CHASS) Center.

== Description ==
The Detroit Savings Bank Southwest Branch building is a two-story concrete and brick Art Deco building with Classical Revival details. It is located on a corner lot, with the facades facing the streets clad in limestone. The other two facades are clad with yellow brick. The building is 35 feet wide and 50 feet deep, with a height of 35 feet 9 inches. The front facade contains a front entrance flanked by two Doric columns and topped with casement windows. The entrance and columns are surrounded by an inverted U of limestone. This U is decorated with an incised Greek meander and rosettes.
