= Bankers Trust Company Building, Detroit =

- Bankers Trust Company Building
- U.S. Historic district – Contributing property
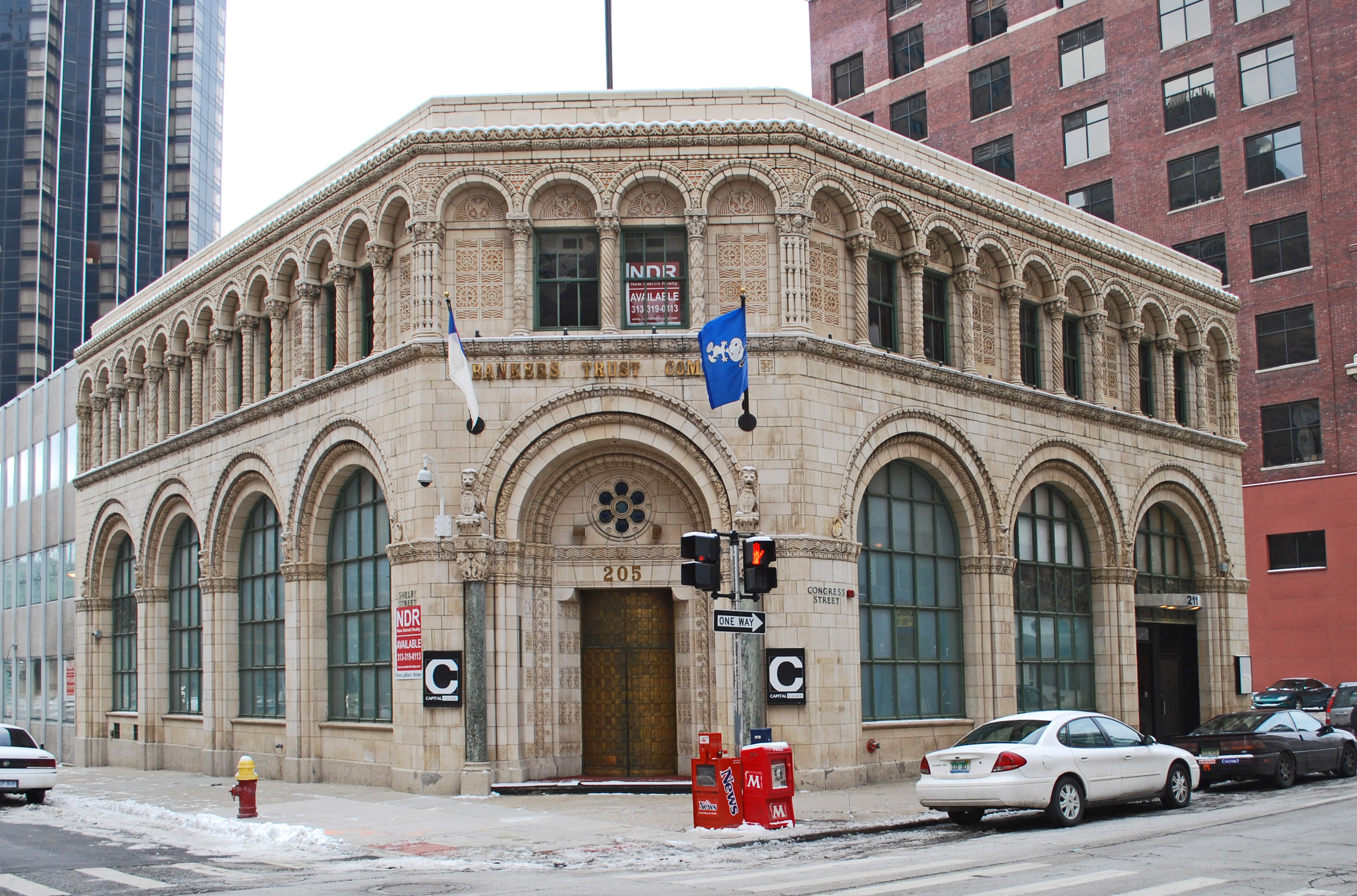
- Location: 205 West Congress Street; Detroit, Michigan
- Coordinates: 42°19′44″N 83°2′53″W
- Built: 1925
- Architect: Wirt C. Rowland of Smith, Hinchman & Grylls
- Architectural style: Romanesque Revival
- Part of: Detroit Financial District (ID09001067)
- Designated CP: December 14, 2009

The Bankers Trust Company Building is an office building located at 205 West Congress Street in Downtown Detroit, Michigan, within the Financial District. Designed by Wirt C. Rowland of Smith, Hinchman & Grylls and completed in 1925 the ornately modeled building is an exquisite example of Italian Romanesque Revival architecture.

== History ==
The Bankers Trust Company was founded in 1917 and its offices were originally located in the State Savings Bank Building, at the northeast corner of West Congress and Shelby Streets. The bank later hired the architectural firm of Smith, Hinchman & Grylls to design a new headquarters building down the street; the structure, designed by Wirt C. Rowland, was completed in 1925. The Bankers Trust Company occupied the building from 1925 to 1948, when a brokerage firm moved in. The structure later housed a fast food restaurant, a diner, and several nightclubs, before being sold in 2015 to an unidentified buyer for $3 million.

== Description ==
The two-story building is faced with terra cotta and includes elaborate exterior Italian Romanesque–style decorations, with massive arched windows designed to admit light to the banking room. The large first-floor arches are echoed on the second floor. Green marble columns topped with lions flank the corner entrance, which once had a revolving door (now removed). The interior has been remodeled multiple times as the structure served different uses; the three-story addition on Shelby Street, designed in the International Style, was completed in 1960.
