= William Kapp =

American architect (1891–1969)

William Edward Kapp (August 20, 1891 in Toledo – 1969) was an American architect. He earned his architectural degree at the University of Pennsylvania. For the majority of his career, he worked for the firm Smith, Hinchman & Grylls.

== Projects ==
Kapp is known as the lead architect on a number of buildings including the following:

- The Players, a clubhouse in Detroit, Michigan (1925)
- Meadow Brook Hall (1926–1929)
- Knole Cottage (1926), a six-room miniature playhouse on the Meadow Brook estate.
- Sunset Terrace, a retirement home for Matilda and Alfred Wilson on Meadow Brook, which in 1953 became the Oakland University president's home.
- Wilson Theatre (now the Music Hall Center for the Performing Arts) in Detroit, Michigan (1928)
- The Horace H. Rackham School of Graduate Studies Building, University of Michigan, Ann Arbor, Michigan (1938)
- Temple Israel in Detroit, Michigan (1949)
- Flint Journal Building in Flint, Michigan (Addition only) (1952–1954)
- Detroit Historical Museum (1951)
- Dossin Great Lakes Museum (1960) on Belle Isle.

He has been credited with interior design work on the Buhl Building, Detroit Institute of Art and Guardian Building, which are important works in downtown Detroit.
