= Buhl Building =

Building in Detroit

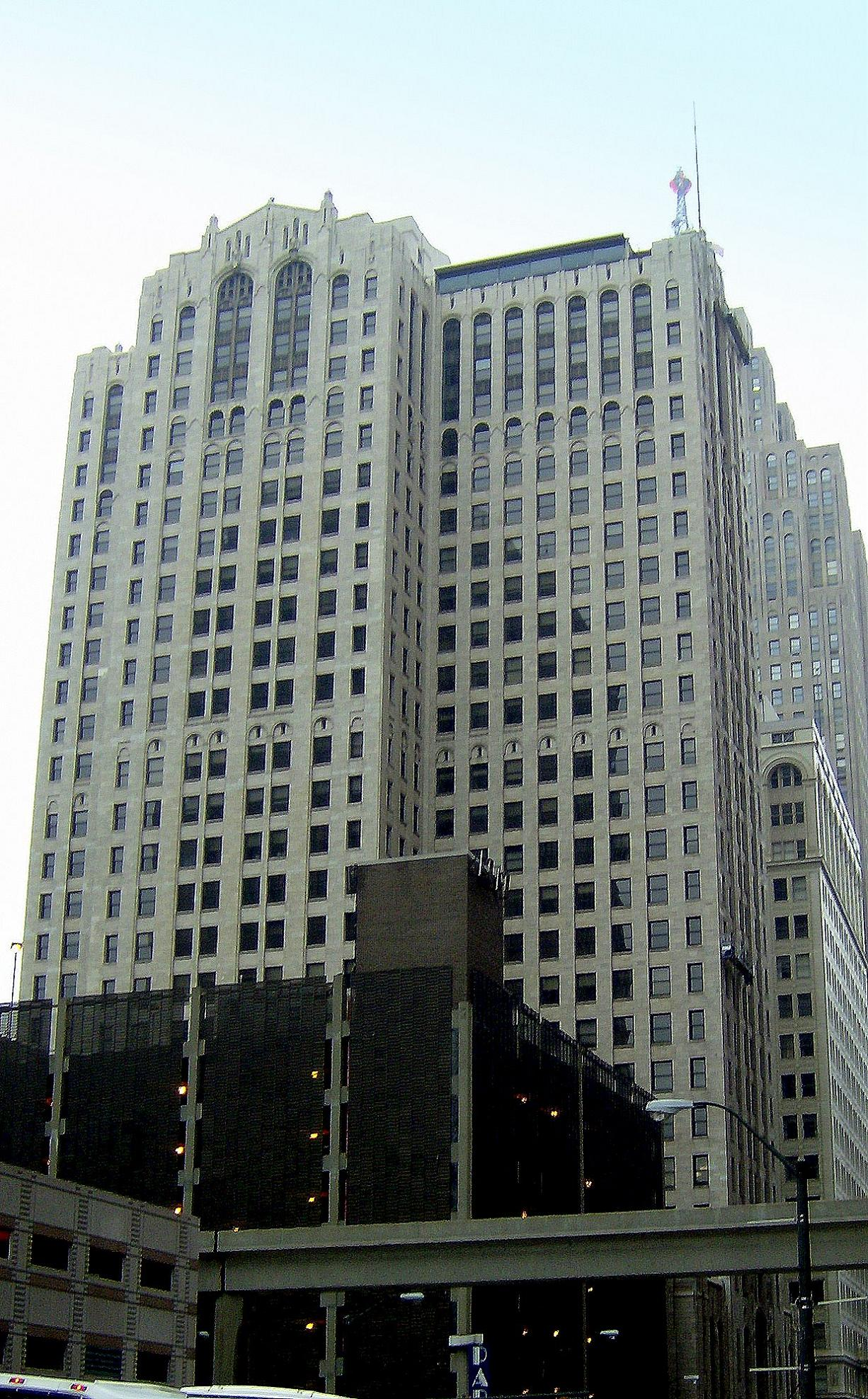

General information
- Type: Commercial offices
- Location: 535 Griswold Street; Detroit, Michigan
- Coordinates: 42.3294°N 83.0469°W
- Completed: 1925
- Owner: Bedrock Detroit

Height
- Roof: 111.6 m (366 ft)
- Top floor: 107.0 m (351.0 ft)

Technical details
- Floor count: 29
- Floor area: 482,454 sq ft (44,821.4 m^{2})
- Lifts/elevators: 13

Design and construction
- Architects: Wirt C. Rowland; SmithGroup
- Buhl Building
- U.S. Historic district – Contributing property
- Architectural style: Neo-Gothic / Romanesque
- Part of: Detroit Financial District (ID09001067)
- Designated CP: December 14, 2009

The Buhl Building is a 29-story office building in the Financial District of downtown Detroit, Michigan. Constructed in 1925, it was designed by Wirt C. Rowland in a Neo-Gothic style with Romanesque accents.

== History ==
The building stands atop what used to be the Savoyard Creek near its confluence with the Detroit River. In 1836, the creek was covered and turned into a sewer. The Savoyard Club occupied the 27th floor of the Buhl Building from 1928 until its membership dwindled and the club closed in 1994.

On June 11, 1982, a man upset over a delayed insurance payment entered a law firm on the 8th floor and opened fire with a shotgun, killing a law clerk, and starting a fire using a Molotov cocktail. People in the building smashed windows for fresh air and to enable rescue, but were forced to wait as Detroit Fire Department ladders were unable to reach above the 6th floor. An off-duty Detroit Police sergeant responded to the scene and took the man into custody; he was ultimately sentenced to life in prison.

== Architecture ==
William Edward Kapp, architect for the firm of Smith, Hinchman & Grylls, has been credited with interior design work on the Buhl Building. The architectural sculpture on the building was designed by Corrado Parducci.

The Citizens Bank Building in downtown Saginaw, Michigan, was modeled after the Buhl Building.

== Tenants ==
The Suburban Mobility Authority for Regional Transportation has its headquarters in the building. Fink + Associates Law's Detroit office is located in Suite 1000. The Consulate of Italy in Detroit was located in Suite 1840 until 2021.

Hubbell, Roth & Clark, a civil engineering firm, is also based in the building.

At one time Real Times Media, the owner of several black newspapers in the US, had its headquarters in the building.

Michigan Nonprofit Association, a statewide membership organization that serves the nonprofit sector, has its Metro Detroit office in the Buhl Building.

== Gallery ==
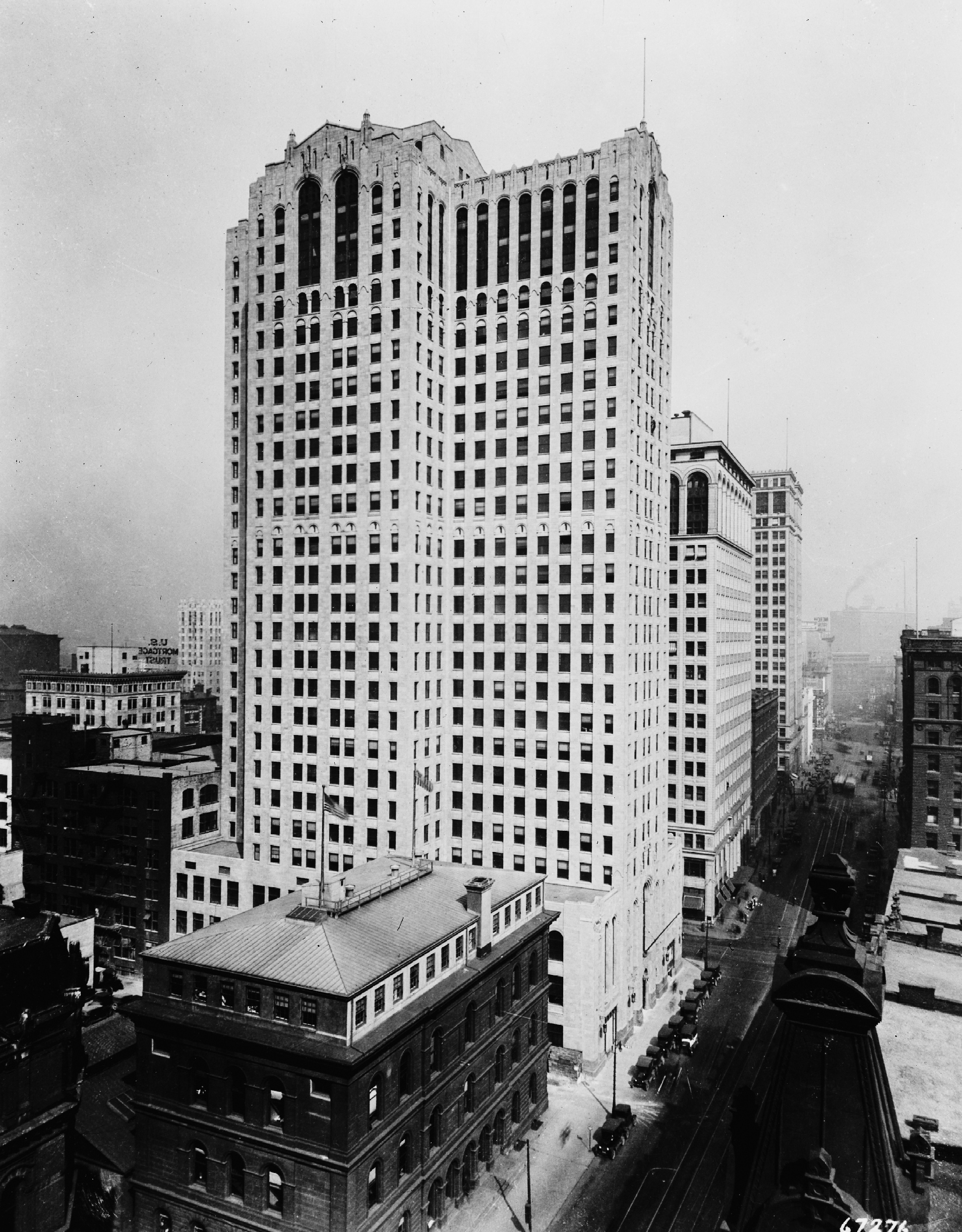
Buhl Building, circa 1920

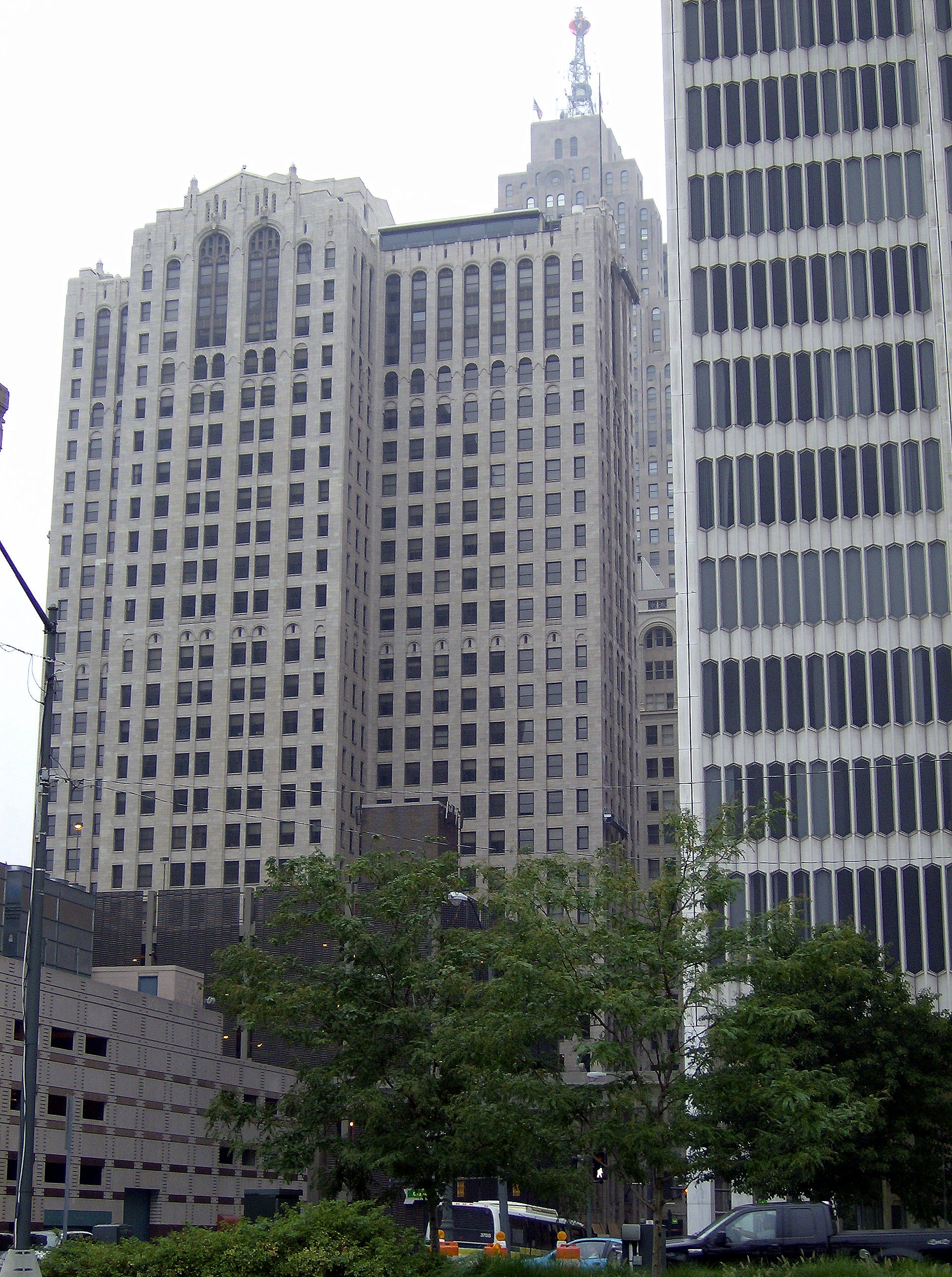
Buhl Building in the shadow of the Penobscot Building

== See also ==
- List of tallest buildings in Detroit
