= Public/Private Ventures =

- P/PV logo
- Abbreviation: P/PV
- Formation: 1978
- Dissolved: 2012
- Purpose: Improving lives in low-income communities
- Headquarters: Philadelphia, Pennsylvania
- Website: http://ppv.issuelab.org/

Public/Private Ventures (P/PV) was a nonprofit, nonpartisan, social research and policy organization; it disbanded on July 31, 2012. Its mission was to improve the effectiveness of policies, programs and community initiatives, especially as they affect vulnerable communities. The organization developed new models and performed evaluations of existing initiatives; it also assisted programs seeking to replicate and expand.

== History ==
In 1978, P/PV was created by the Ford Foundation and the US Department of Labor to bring together the government, business and nonprofit sectors to address the needs of disadvantaged young people. The organization's initial work focused on evaluating and creating strategies to connect these youth to education and jobs. Its work now focuses on a wide range of social issues, including community health, youth development, faith-based initiatives, sectoral employment, mentoring, after-school programs, youth violence and prisoner reentry.

Early findings from P/PV's summer youth employment and education programs influenced the 1986 Congress to mandate that federally supported summer jobs programs have a remediation component. In 1995, P/PV's widely publicized study, Making a Difference: An Impact Study of Big Brothers Big Sisters, showed that BBBS' community-based mentoring program had positive impacts on a range of important outcomes for youth, including curtailing drug use, improving school attendance and reducing schoolyard fighting. With the support of the US Department of Labor, US Department of Justice, Annie E. Casey Foundation and Ford Foundation, P/PV engaged in the process of implementing and evaluating Ready4Work—a three-year demonstration project designed to more comprehensively address the needs of former prisoners. Both community- and faith-based organizations provided participants with employment services, case management and mentoring. More recently, P/PV published the findings from its Sectoral Employment Impact Study, which showed that participants in sector-focused training programs earned significantly more, were more likely to work, and were significantly more likely to have jobs that offered benefits than control group members. The White House Council of Economic Advisers cited P/PV's work on this issue, noting that "sector-focused training programs...are one promising approach to fostering collaboration between training providers and employers."

== Organization ==
Headquartered in Philadelphia, P/PV also had offices located in New York City and Oakland, with staff numbering around 50. Its last president, Nadya K. Shmavonian, began her tenure in January 2010. Earlier presidents include Frederick A. Davie, Gary Walker, Mike Bailin, Rick deLone and Graham Finney. In 2008, P/PV reported an operating budget of over $20 million. Senior fellows included Michael A. Bailin, Wilson Goode, Loren Harris, Geri Summerville, Nick Torres, Tony Proscio and Patti Patrizi.

In 2012, the Board of Directors were: Cay Stratton (chair), Phil Buchanan, Cynthia F. Figueroa, Clayton S. Rose, Sudhir Alladi Venkatesh and William Julius Wilson.

P/PV was funded by a wide range of public and private sources, including:

=== Public Funders ===
- United States Department of Labor
- United States Department of Justice
- United States Department of Education
- City of Newark
- City of Philadelphia

=== Private Funders ===
- Charles Stewart Mott Foundation
- The Annie E. Casey Foundation
- The Atlantic Philanthropies
- Robert Wood Johnson Foundation
- The Wallace Foundation
- The Bill & Melinda Gates Foundation
- The New York Community Trust
- Open Society Institute
- The Edna McConnell Clark Foundation
- The James Irvine Foundation
- William Penn Foundation

== Closure ==
Like many other nonprofits, P/PV was hit hard by the economic downturn. Having been unable, even after difficult staff cuts, to find long-term funding to cover its core operational expenses, the board of P/PV concluded that the organization was no longer sustainable in the changed funding climate. Nearly 35 years after it was founded, P/PV ceased operations by July 31, 2012.
