= Town Apartments =

- Pontchartrain Club / Town House Apartments
- U.S. National Register of Historic Places
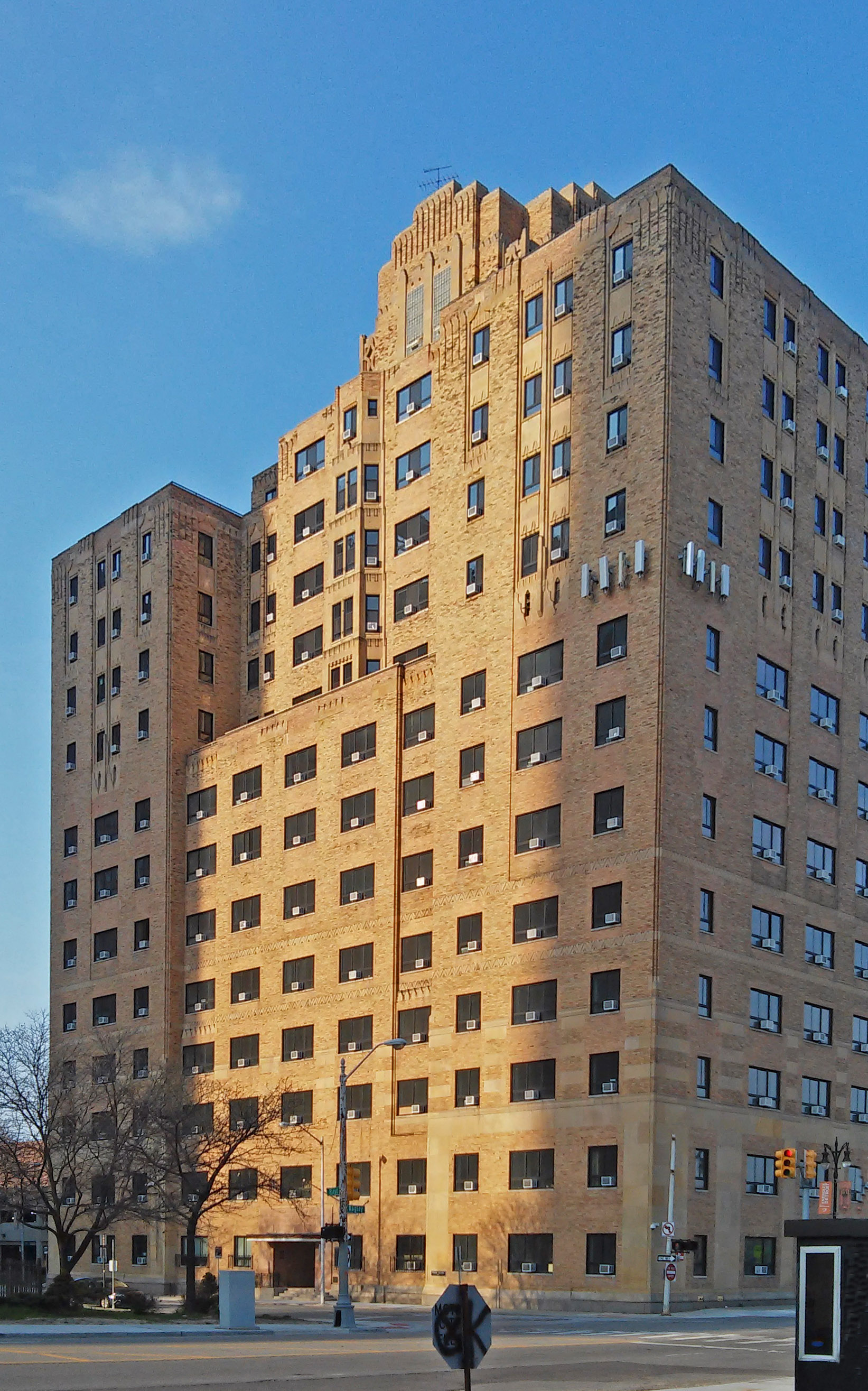
- Interactive map
- Location: 1511 First Street; Detroit, Michigan
- Coordinates: 42°19′58″N 83°03′18″W
- Built: 1928–29; 1951–53
- Architect: Wirt C. Rowland of Smith, Hinchman & Grylls; The Byrne Organization, Inc. (remodeling)
- Architectural style: Art Deco, International Style
- NRHP reference No.: 16000181
- Added to NRHP: April 19, 2016

Town Residences, formerly the Town Apartments, is a high-rise apartment building located at 1511 First Street (at the corner of First Street and Bagley Avenue) in Downtown Detroit, Michigan. Originally designed by Wirt C. Rowland, the structure was built in two distinct phases: construction started in 1928 but was soon halted by the Great Depression, and the building was left open to the elements for two decades before being finally completed in 1953. It was listed on the National Register of Historic Places in 2016.

== History ==
The building was originally constructed to serve as the clubhouse for the Detroit chapter of the National Town and Country Club. The private organization—which changed its name to Pontchartrain Club in the late 1920s—commissioned architect Wirt C. Rowland of Smith, Hinchman & Grylls (himself a member of the Club) to design the structure, envisioned to include public spaces, athletic facilities, and rooms for overnight stays. Construction began in September 1928, but came abruptly to an end with the advent of the Great Depression: the Pontchartrain Club closed down and the building was left unfinished, with only the exterior walls and roof completed.

The structure sat vacant and open to the elements—no windows had been installed—for more than twenty years. In the early 1950s it was bought by Cleveland investors and converted into apartments: construction began in 1951 and lasted until 1953, when the utterly remodeled building finally opened under the name Town Apartments.

In September 2014, Triton Investment Co. announced its purchase of the building. Triton had previously acquired Alden Park Towers along East Jefferson. The $5 million, 18-month renovation, completed in spring 2016, included the installation of new heating and cooling systems, updated windows, and new kitchens and flooring in the residences. Other upgrades included an on-site laundry room, bicycle storage, a community room and fitness center. The building was renamed Town Residences.

== Architecture ==
The building stands at 16 floors (including the basement floor and central tower), to a total height of 59 metres (194 ft). The lower portion of the structure (floors one through eight) is approximately rectangular in plan while the upper floors feature a U-shaped footprint, with a recessed central section flanked by four-story wings and surmounted by an elaborate two-story tower. The building is constructed of concrete and steel, and faced with tan brick, Mankato stone, and granite.

Although the façades of the building were originally designed in the Art Deco architectural style, the exterior was heavily remodeled between 1951 and 1953 to reflect the new International Style aesthetic. Much of the elaborate stone decoration was removed, and the tall and narrow windows were replaced with wider openings; original features survive on the upper floors, most notably on the central tower. The 1953 lobby, later altered, still retains two sets of original fluted columns.
