= Charles Stewart Mott Foundation =

Private foundation based in Flint, Michigan, United States

- Formation: 1926
- Founder: Charles Stewart Mott
- Type: Private foundation
- Headquarters: Mott Foundation Building, Flint, Michigan, United States
- Chairman: Ridgway H. White
- Vice Chairman: Frederick S. Kirkpatrick
- Revenue: $110 million (2022)
- Expenses: $222 million (2022)
- Website: www.mott.org

The Charles Stewart Mott Foundation is a private foundation founded in 1926 by Charles Stewart Mott of Flint, Michigan. Mott was a leading industrialist in Flint through his association with General Motors.

The foundation administers funds through four programs: Civil society, Environment, Flint Area, and Pathways out of Poverty, and it also funds special exploratory projects. It supports nonprofit programs throughout the United States and, on a limited basis, internationally. In 2022, the foundation had year-end total assets of $ 3.7 billion and made 385 grants totalling $190.6 million. In 2006, the foundation had year-end total assets of $2.6 billion and made 545 grants totalling $107.3 million. Some organizations that the foundation has funded are the Kettering University, Public/Private Ventures, The Nature Conservancy, University of Michigan, Jobs for the Future, Afterschool Alliance, Kentucky Child Now, Flint Institute of Arts and Focus: HOPE.

It is a member of the Network of European Foundations for Innovative Cooperation (NEF) and the European Foundation Centre.

== History ==
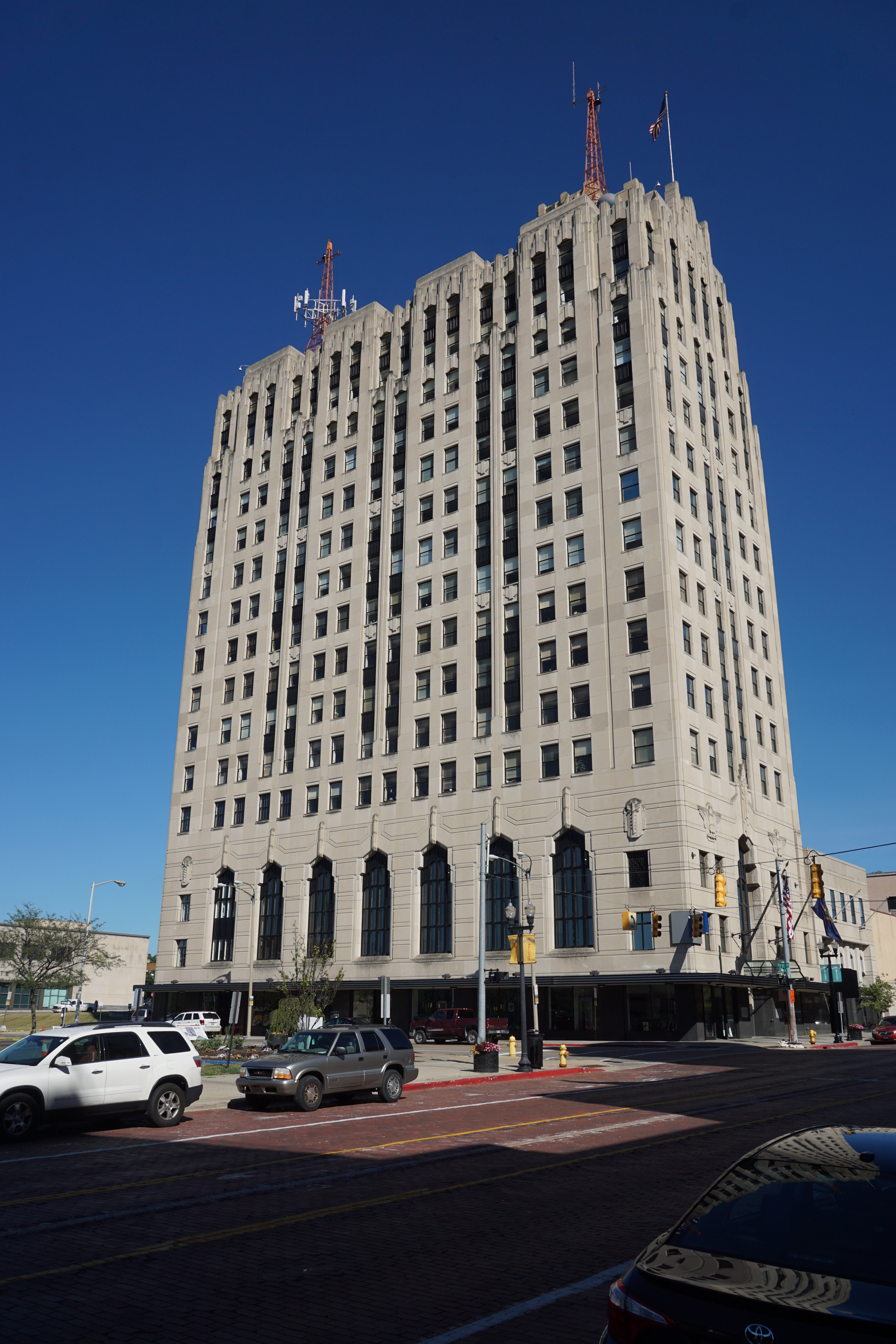
The Charles Stewart Mott Foundation Building, formerly the Union Industrial Bank Building, in Flint, Michigan

In June 1926, the Charles Stewart Mott Foundation was founded by C.S. Mott. Starting in 1928, the foundation made annual gifts to the Flint Institute of Arts. With the establishment of the Flint Cultural Center in 1958, this annual contribution was shifted to the cultural center.

In 1968, the Genesee County park system was started with the purchase of vacant land funded by the Charles Stewart Mott Foundation with a stipulation that a parks commission be formed.

Mott transferred U.S. Sugar shares to the foundation. In 1969 with a law passed limiting what private family foundations could hold of a corporation, the foundation gave a large number of shares to the Mott Children's Health Center, a Flint charitable medical organization founded in 1939, to be below the 35% limit.

In June 2017, the foundation's 91st year, the Mott Foundation had surpassed over $1 billion in grants dispersed.

In November 2018, the CEO, William White announced his immediate retirement and replacement by Ridgeway White as successor. White died in October 2019, aged 82.
