= Temple Israel (West Bloomfield, Michigan) =

Reform synagogue in West Bloomfield, Michigan, US

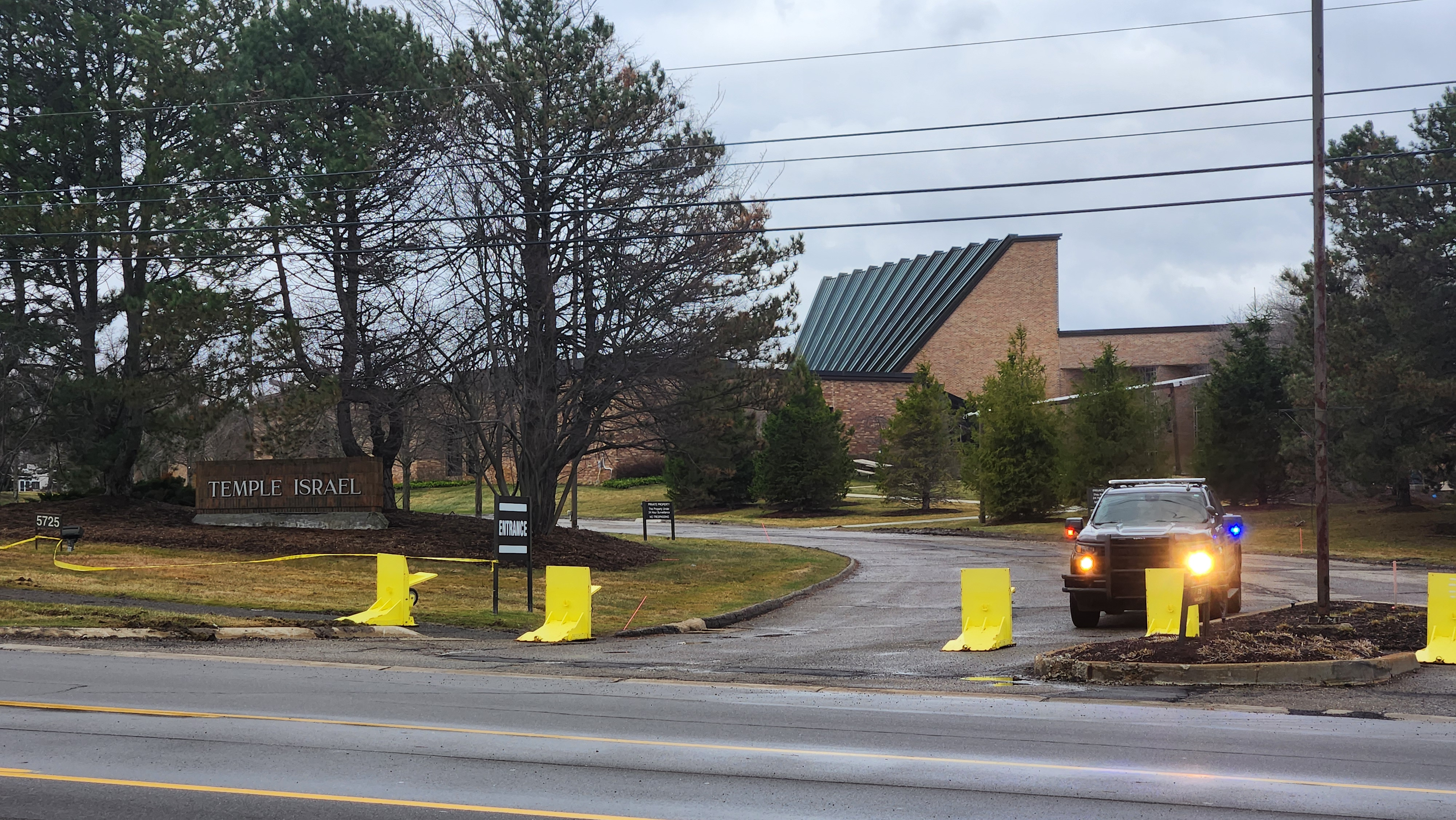

- Location of the current synagogue in Michigan

Religion
- Affiliation: Reform Judaism
- Ecclesiastical or organizational status: Synagogue
- Leadership: Rabbi Harold Loss; Rabbi Paul Yedwab; Rabbi Joshua Bennett; Rabbi Marla Hornsten; Rabbi Jennifer Kaluzny; Rabbi Jennifer Lader; Rabbi Ariana Gordon
- Status: Active

Location
- Location: 5725 Walnut Lake Road, West Bloomfield Township, Oakland County, Michigan 48323
- Country: United States
- Interactive map of Temple Israel
- Coordinates: 42°33′20″N 83°23′47″W

Architecture
- Architects: William Kapp (1950 and 1980) (Smith, Hinchman & Grylls)
- Type: Synagogue
- Founder: Rabbi Leon Fram
- Established: 1941 (as a congregation)
- Completed: 1950 (Palmer Park); 1980 (West Bloomfield)

Website
- temple-israel.org
- Temple Israel (Palmer Park)
- U.S. Historic district – Contributing property
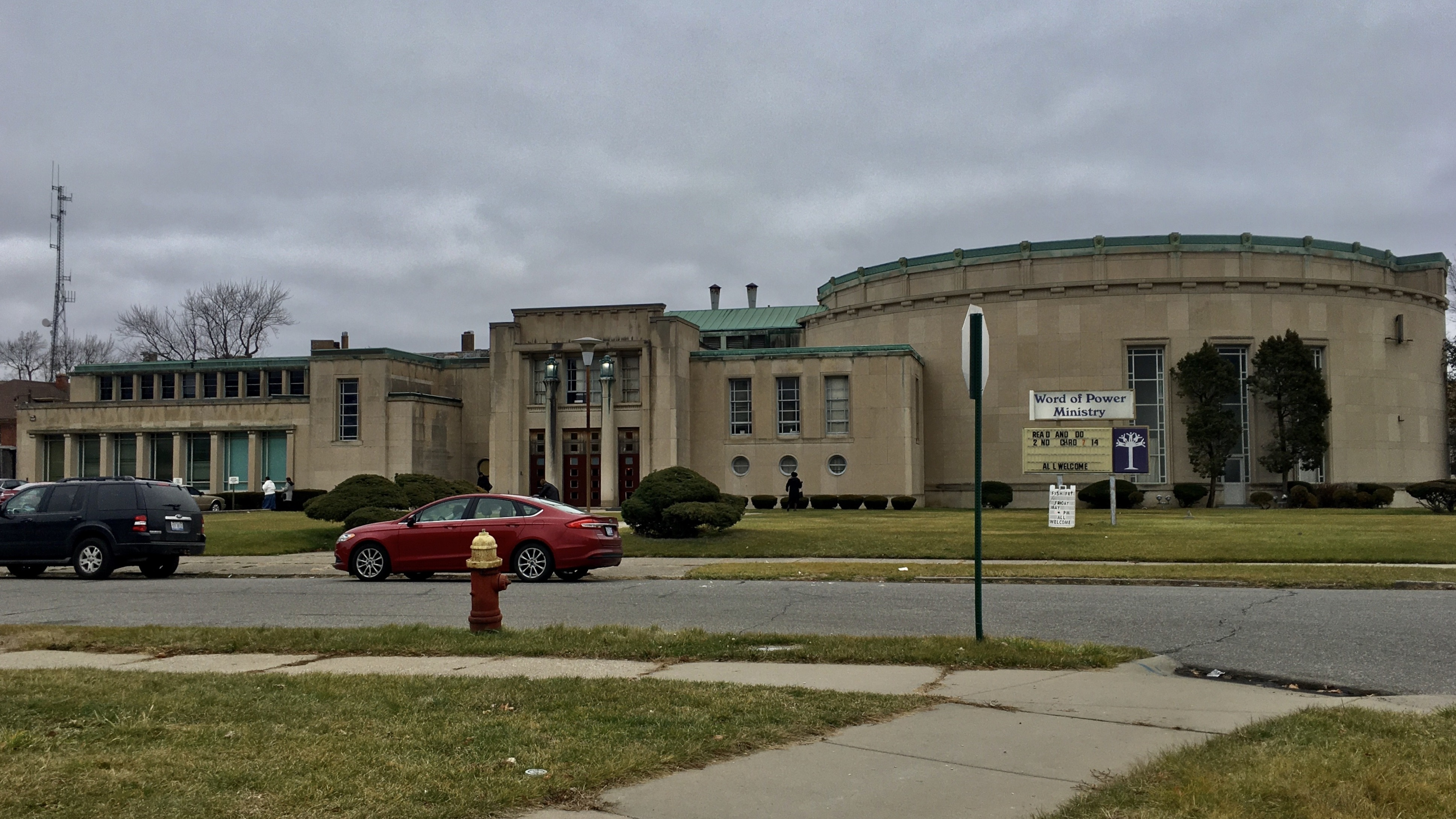
- The former synagogue, now church, in 2020
- Location: 17400 Manderson Road, Palmer Park, Detroit, Michigan 48203
- Coordinates: 42°25′09″N 83°06′54″W
- Built: 1950
- Architect: William Kapp
- Architectural style: Art Moderne
- Part of: Palmer Park Apartment Building Historic District (ID83000895)
- Designated CP: May 21, 1983

Temple Israel is a Reform synagogue located in West Bloomfield Township, Michigan, United States.

In 2008, MLive Media Group stated that Temple Israel was the largest Jewish congregation in the United States. As of 2012, the congregation claimed that it is the largest congregation in North America, and the official database of the Union for Reform Judaism reported that the congregation has 3,383 families in its membership.

== History ==
The congregation was founded in 1941 in Detroit, just 60 days before the United States entered World War II, by members who broke away from another congregation since it was insufficiently supportive of Zionism and the creation of a Jewish state.

In 1949, the congregation erected an Art Moderne-style temple designed by architect William Kapp that officially opened in 1950.

The congregation moved to West Bloomfield in 1980, in a building located on Walnut Lake Road that was designed by the Bloomfield Hills architectural firm of TMP Associates, Inc.

The original temple in the Palmer Park area has been occupied by the Word of Power Ministry, an Evangelical Christian church, previously the Saint Paul Apostolic Temple Church, since 1989. The former synagogue building was included in the National Register of Historic Places as a contributing property that is part of Detroit's Palmer Park Apartment Building Historic District, designated in 1983, with a boundary increase in 2015. Temple Israel completed additional renovations to the Sanctuary in 2017.

On March 12, 2026, a shooting and vehicle-ramming attack occurred at Temple Israel. Police in West Bloomfield Township reported that shots were fired after a naturalized U.S. citizen born in Lebanon intentionally crashed his car into the building and drove down a hallway. The car contained explosives and the driver carried an assault rifle.

== Current leadership ==
Temple Israel has a unique leadership model. Unlike most traditional multi-clergy synagogues, Temple Israel does not have a hierarchical rabbinical leadership structure. Each member of the clergy team is considered an equal.

Rabbi Harold Loss is the longest-serving active member of the clergy team, joining Temple Israel in 1971. Rabbi Paul Yedwab joined him in 1986, and Rabbi Josh Bennett in 1995. Rabbi Marla Hornsten became the Temple's first female Rabbi in 2000, and Cantor Neil Michaels joined the clergy in 2002. Rabbi Jennifer Kaluzny and Cantor Michael Smolash came on board in the summer of 2004, with Rabbi Jennifer Lader's arrival in 2012.

The executive director of Temple Israel is Jason Plotkin, who began serving the congregation in June 2022. Plotkin is a former President of the Program & Engagement Professionals of Reform Judaism, a Senior Member of the National Association of Temple Administration (NATA) and serves on the North American Board of the Union for Reform Judaism.
