= Kentucky Child Now =

Kentucky Child Now (KCN), founded in 2000, is a non-profit organization dedicated to promoting the welfare of children throughout the state of Kentucky. It is the Kentucky affiliate of America's Promise, an organization started by Colin Powell in 1997 for child welfare. The organization operates around the fundamental principle that youth need access to five resources for success: "1) caring adults; 2) safe places; 3) a healthy start; 4) marketable skills; and 5) opportunities to serve".

== Programs ==
In 2000, KCN in conjunction with the Kentucky 4-H Program, initiated the "Positive Youth Development State and Local Collaboration Demonstration Project", with the purpose of encouraging collaboration between state and local youth service providers. In 2007, KCN was one of 51 agencies to lead Youth Service America's "National & Global Youth Service Day". It has a several year partnership with the Kentucky Pediatric Society in providing the "Child Health Practitioner Support Grant" to facilitate the training of pediatric health care specialists in pediatric mental health and substance abuse issues. As part of its concern with pediatric mental health, KCN developed a flow-chart which the Association of Maternal and Child Health Programs dispenses to pediatricians and physicians to give information to parents concerned with locating proper mental health treatment for their children. The organization also encourages quality child care through its "Site of Promise" program, which recognizes exemplary child care providers. In October 2007, KCN was provided a substantial grant by the Charles Stewart Mott Foundation to "develop the Kentucky statewide afterschool network".
