= Kirk in the Hills =

Church in Bloomfield Township, MI, USA

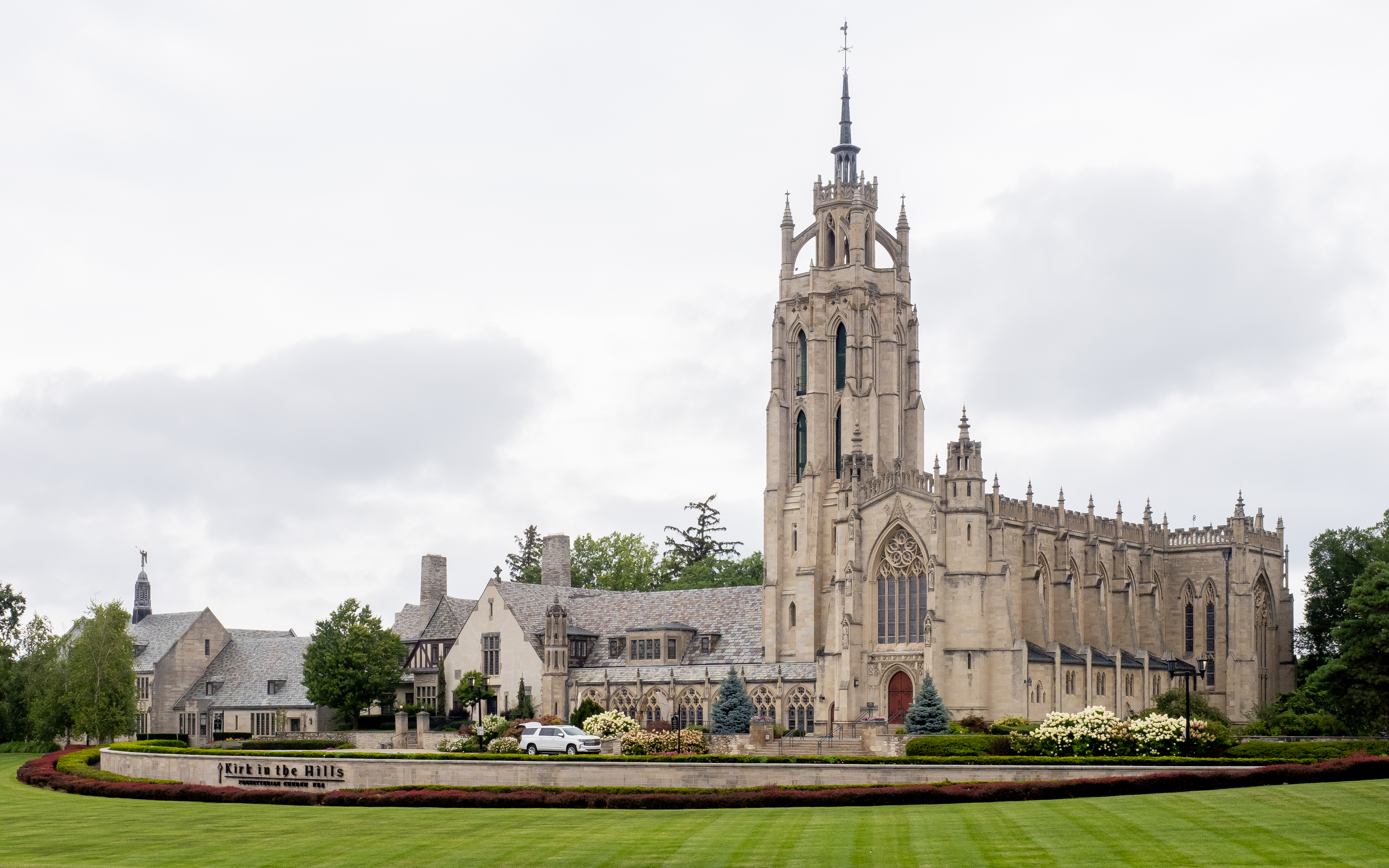
- Kirk in the Hills
- 42.5812727°N 83.29436245°W
- Location: Bloomfield Hills, Michigan
- Country: United States
- Denomination: Presbyterian Church (USA)
- Website: https://kirkinthehills.org/

History
- Founded: 1951

Architecture
- Style: Gothic
- Completed: November 23, 1958

Kirk in the Hills Presbyterian (1958) is a church located in Bloomfield Township, Michigan.

== Overview ==
Kirk in the Hills is situated on a 40-acre setting on Island Lake. It is of Gothic design and is patterned after the famous Melrose Abbey in Scotland that was built in the 13th century.

The sanctuary is situated at the east end of Cedarholm, which was the home of Colonel Edwin S. George, whose gift of his home and estate in 1947 made the Kirk possible. As early as 1933 he saw the need for a church in this area and established the George Foundation for that purpose. The congregation was organized by the Presbytery of Detroit in 1947, and the first services were held that year in Cedarholm Chapel. The cornerstone for the church was laid in 1951, the same year Colonel George died. His remains are entombed under the Narthex of the Kirk's sanctuary.

The architectural firm of George D. Mason completed the church based on preliminary designs by Wirt Rowland. Rowland, who worked for Mason at the beginning of his career, died in 1946 during the design process. Services were held in the Undercroft beginning in 1952 and continued during the construction of the church until a disastrous fire destroyed most of the roof. The Church held its first services in the sanctuary on November 23, 1958. Kirk in the Hills is modeled after Scotland's Melrose Abbey. Set on 40 acres (160,000 m^{2}) of beautifully landscaped lakeside grounds, Kirk in the Hills constitutes a fine example of Gothic architecture in the United States. Kirk is the Scottish word for Church.

The Kirk in the Hills Preschool is hosted in the west wing of the eponymous church. The preschool is for children from the ages of 2 to 5 years old.

== Tower and Carillon ==
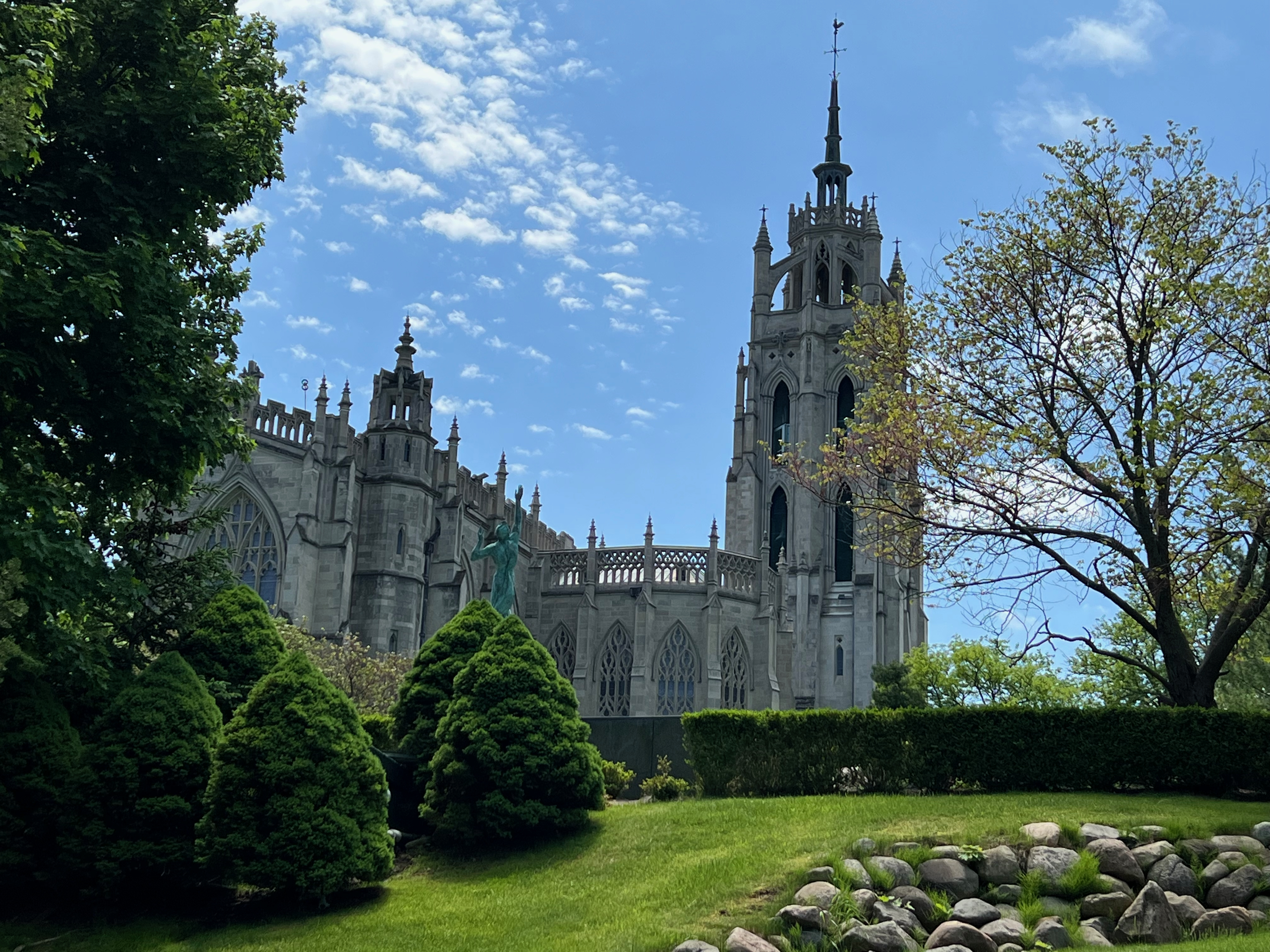
Tower of the Apostles

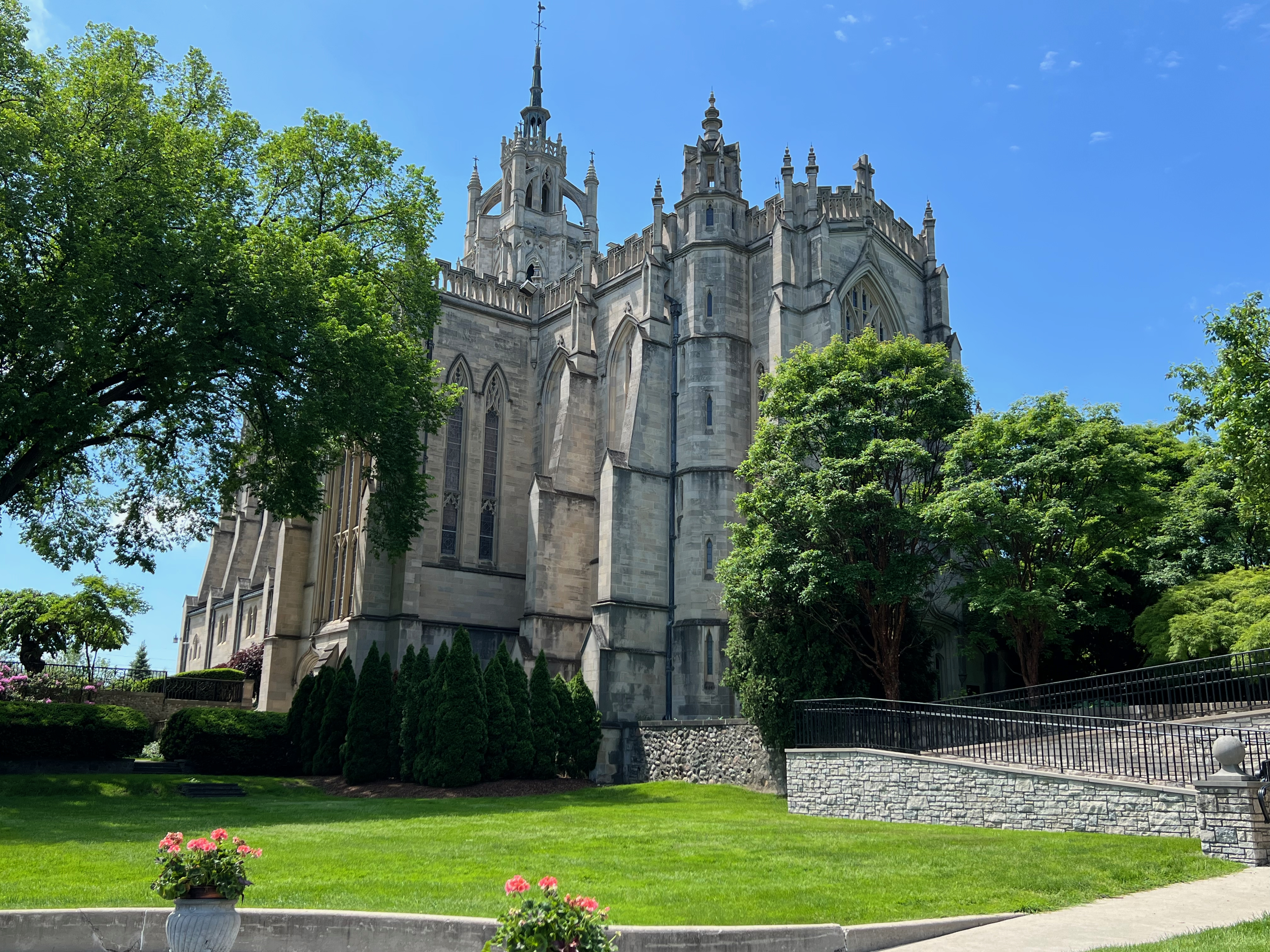
Kirk in the Hills Side Detail

The church includes the Tower of the Apostles. The tower, which houses the world's largest carillon in the number of bells contained, was installed in 1960. The Bells were donated by the Roy A. Fruehauf family and the five largest bells are named after the members of the Fruehauf Family: Roy, Ruth, Royce, Randall, and Ruth Ann. Previously Mr. Fruehauf had donated the Organ to the Church after the fire. Mr. Fruehauf was instrumental in the building of the church and made a generous donation just before his death in 1965. The 77-bells range from a 6'10" 6-short ton bourdon to the smallest at 6" 14-pounds.

== Sculpture ==
The church contains sculpture by some of the leading architectural sculptors of the day, Lee Lawrie, Corrado Parducci, and John Angel and Italian stone carver Harry Liva of Ingalls Stone Company in Bedford, IN, who worked in Indiana Oolitic limestone. The interior also contains ceramic tile by Pewabic Pottery. The gardens contain sculpture by Marshall Fredericks.

== Sculpture gallery ==
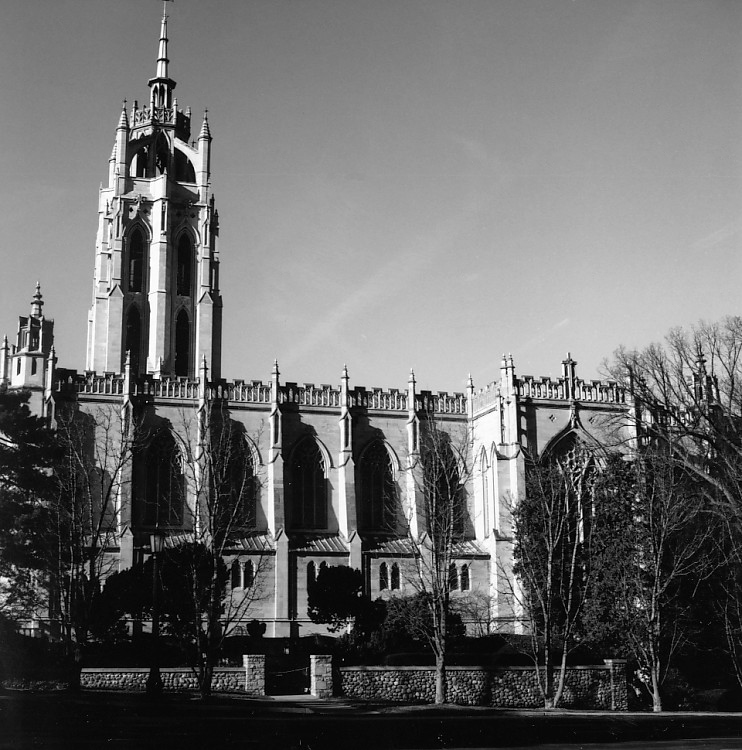
South Façade

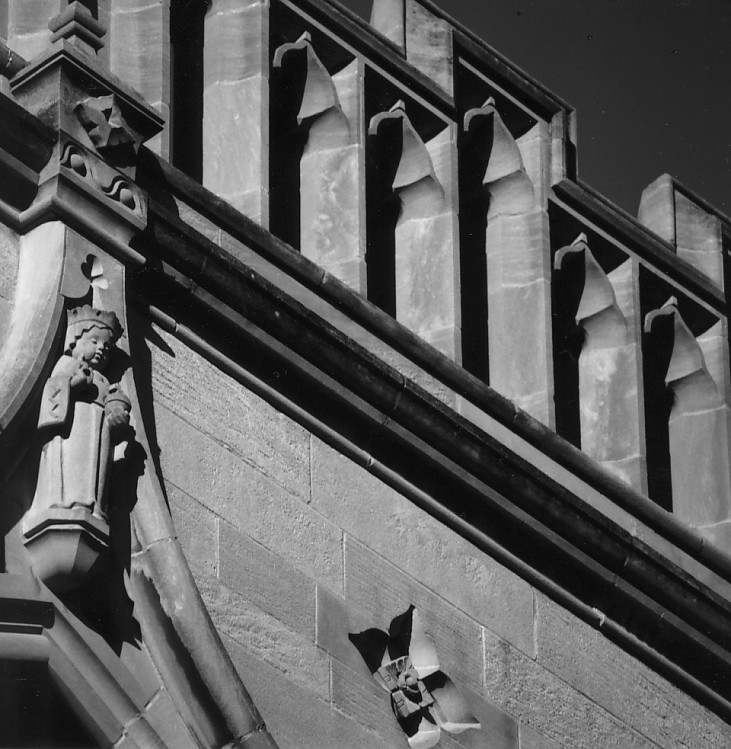
Façade detail

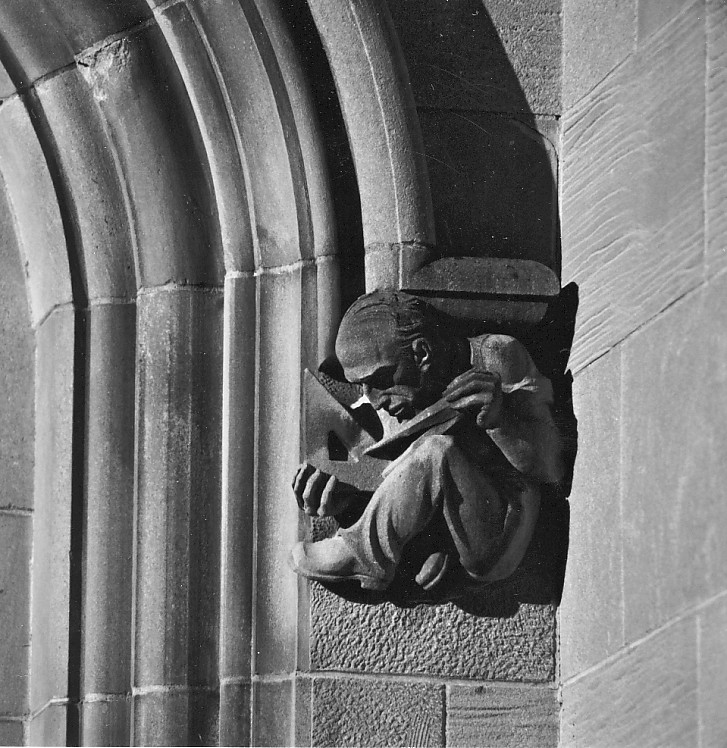
Architect Wirt C. Rowland

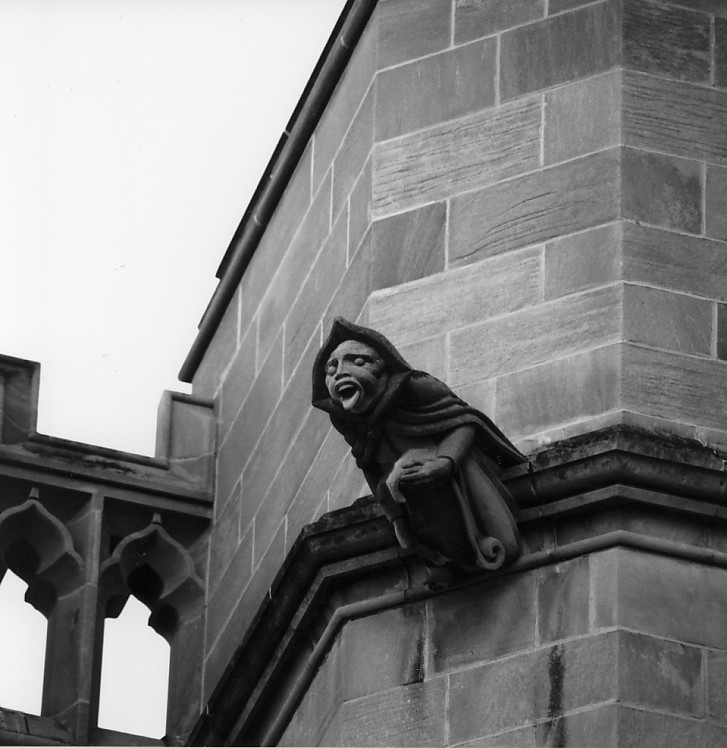
gargoyle

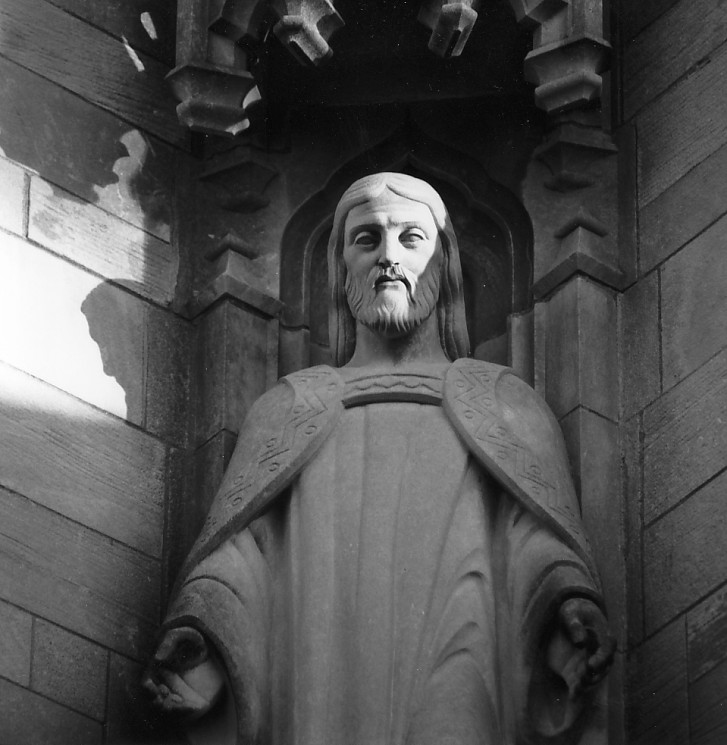
Christ

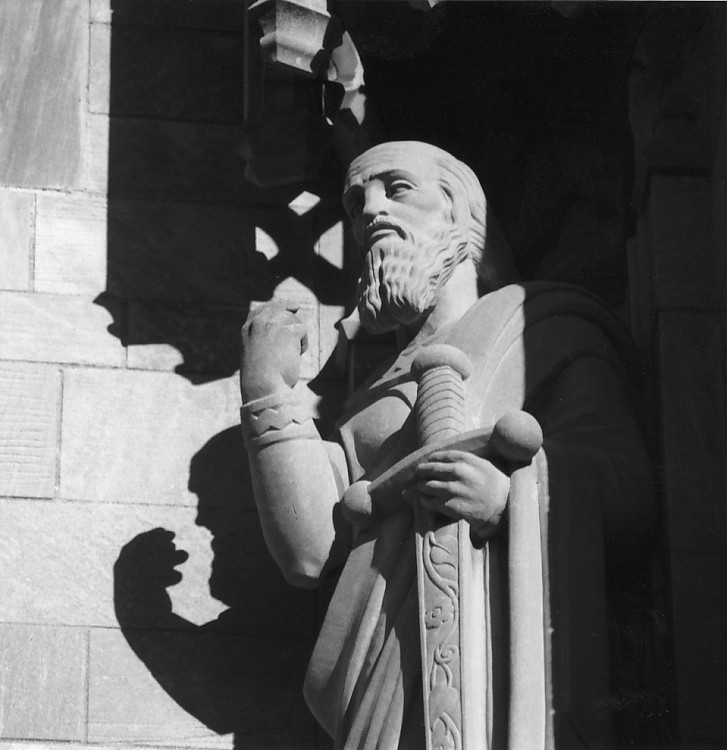
St. Paul

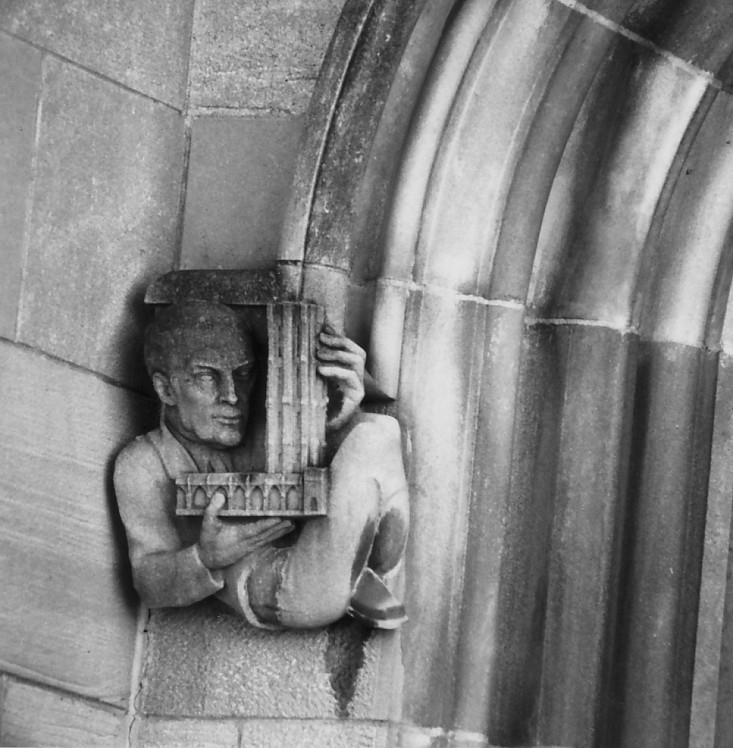
Edwin George with model of the Kirk

== See also ==
- Architecture of metropolitan Detroit
- Melrose Abbey — Kirk in the Hills is patterned after Melrose Abbey in Scotland.
