= Wirt C. Rowland =

American architect

- Born: December 1, 1878; Clinton, Michigan
- Died: November 30, 1946 (aged 67); Grand Rapids, Michigan
- Education: Harvard Graduate School of Design
- Occupation: Architect
- Practice: George D. Mason Co. Designer (1902–1909) Malcomson and Higginbotham; Associate (1912–1915) Albert Kahn Associates; Designer (1910, and 1915–1918); Chief Designer (1918–1922) Smith Hinchman & Grylls; Chief Designer (1922–1930) O'Dell and Rowland Associate Architects 1931–1938
- Buildings: Bankers Trust Co Building (1925); Buhl Building (1925); Penobscot Building (1928); Guardian Building (1929)

Wirt Rowland Informational Designation
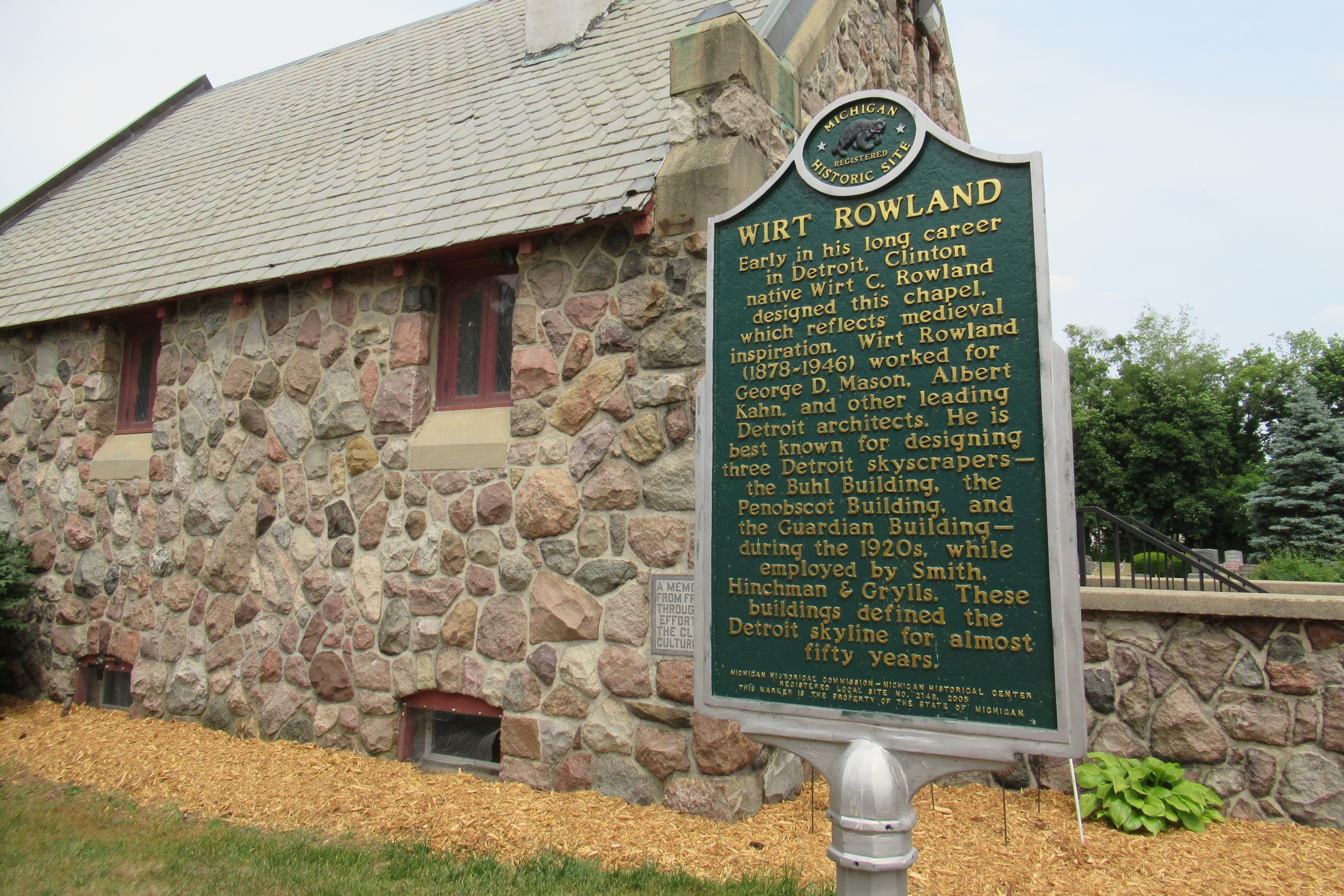
- Interactive map of Wirt Rowland; Informational Designation
- 42°04′32″N 83°58′34″W
- Location: 208 Coman Street; Clinton, Michigan

Michigan State Historic Site
- Designated: 2005

Wirt Clinton Rowland (December 1, 1878 – November 30, 1946) was an American architect best known for his work in Detroit, Michigan.

== Biography ==
Rowland was born December 1, 1878, in Clinton, Michigan, to Clinton Charles and Melissa Ruth Rowland. In 1901, he landed a job as an office boy for the Detroit firm of Rogers and MacFarlane, quickly moving on to the prestigious George D. Mason firm. In 1909, he joined the office of Albert Kahn Associates, who had also apprenticed under Mason. In 1910, with the encouragement of both Mason and Kahn, Rowland attended the Harvard Graduate School of Design in Cambridge, for a year.

The combination of Rowland's natural design talent, Harvard education, and Detroit's healthy economy positioned him to make major contributions to the city's architecture. Rowland is a case study in design attribution. In 1911, in the office of Kahn, he and Ernest Wilby are said have been primarily responsible for the Hill Auditorium at the University of Michigan. Through 1915, Rowland worked for the local firm of Malcomson & Higginbotham. He then returned to Kahn's office, contributing to the firm's classic projects, namely the Harland Hatcher Graduate Library at the University of Michigan, the Detroit News Building, the First National Building (1922), and the General Motors Building (1922).

Rowland's career peaked as Head Designer (1922–1930) of Smith, Hinchman & Grylls (SmithGroup). There, he designed a dozen major structures in downtown Detroit; among these are a number of the city's most accomplished and evocative buildings. To a large extent, Rowland helped define Detroit's architectural genre. Of the Guardian building Rowland said, We no longer live in a leisurely age, . . What we see we must see quickly in passing, and the impression must be immediate, strong, and complete. Color has this vital power. For the Guardian Building, he had assembled a multitude of artisans, mosaicists, sculptors, painters, and tile manufacturers including sculptor Corrado Parducci, muralist Ezra Winter, and tile from the Rookwood and Pewabic pottery companies. He thus recreated the architectural synthesis of a medieval cathedral. Hence, Rowland had reached a climax, when his Union Trust/Guardian Building became known as the Cathedral of Finance.

The Guardian Building opened in 1929. With the onset of the Great Depression, most of the employees of Smith Hinchman & Grylls were laid off, including Rowland. In January 1931, he joined in a partnership with his long-time friend, Augustus (Gus) O'Dell. The firm secured a small number of important commissions, including the Victor Vaughan House dormitory at the University of Michigan, Maire Elementary School in Grosse Pointe, and the Mark Twain Branch Library in Detroit, supplemented with reconstruction necessitated by the widening of Woodward Avenue, and by insurance re-valuations of existing buildings.

Beginning in 1935, Rowland was hired by Edwin S. George to design a Gothic cathedral, later known as Kirk in the Hills. The church was to have been constructed on land owned by George adjoining his suburban home in Bloomfield Hills, Michigan, however, the funds available were insufficient to proceed with construction. In 1946, George realized that by incorporating his existing suburban home into the church to house administrative activities, the cost of construction would be greatly reduced. Rowland approved of this revision, but died before he could redraw the plans. The firm of George D. Mason & Co. was hired in 1947 to draw new plans for the church and oversee construction and the church was completed in 1958.

Rowland was a member of the Chandler Park Partnership, a group of nineteen architects and engineers that designed Parkside housing project (1935–1938) in Detroit. During World War II, Rowland was employed by the firm Giffels & Valet in their office at Naval Station Norfolk. Among the structures he designed during that period was the David Adams Memorial Chapel and Our Lady of Victory Chapel in the base chapel building.

== Rowland Designed Structures ==
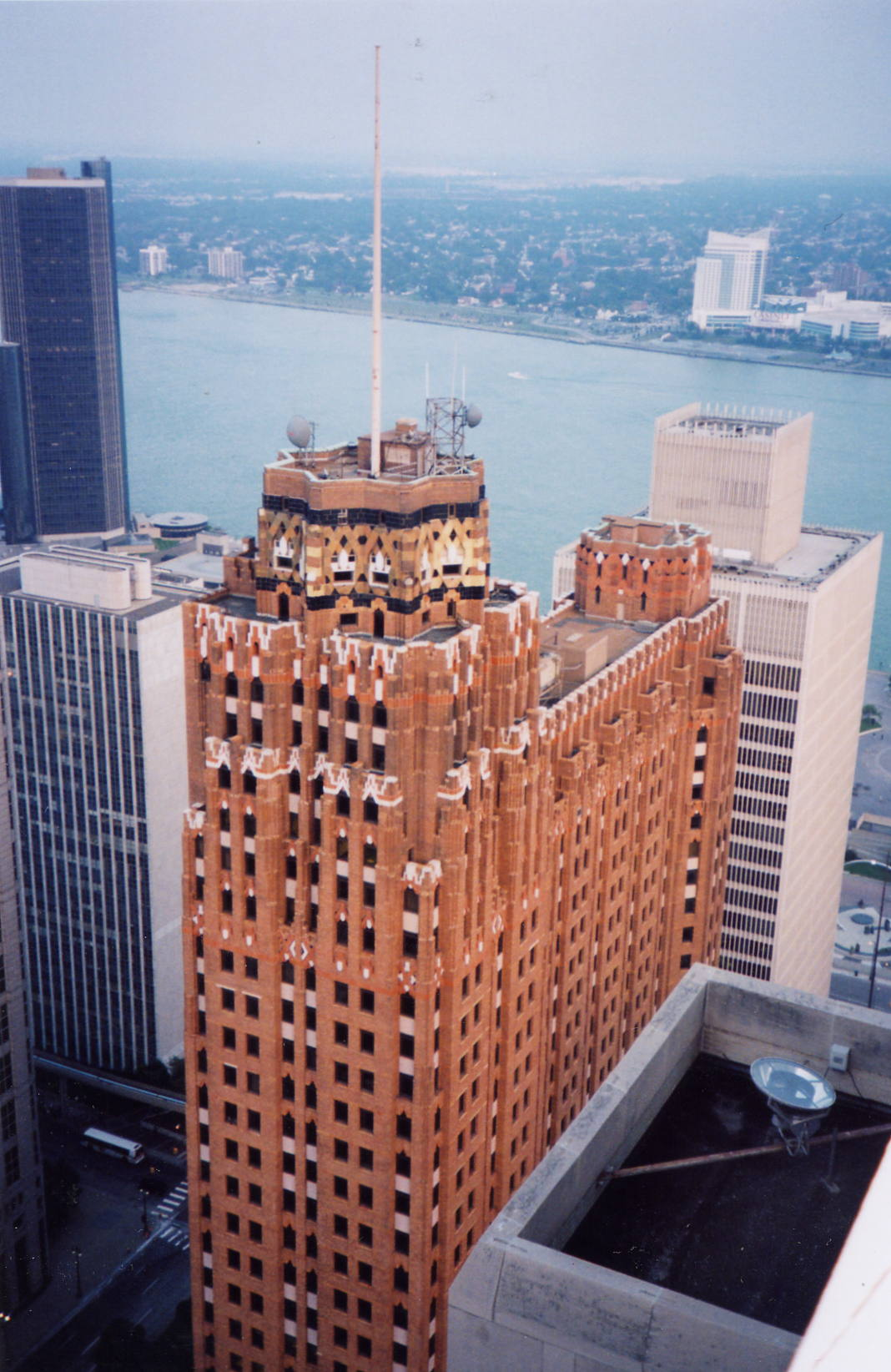
The Guardian Building in Detroit, with its lavish interior.

- T. B. Rayl Company Building (1915) Woodward Avenue, Detroit, Michigan; designed by Rowland for Baxter and O'Dell, featured an early use of colored terra-cotta.

=== Designs for George D. Mason, 1902 to 1909 ===
- Pontchartrain Hotel (1907), Detroit, Michigan

=== Designs for Malcomson & Higginbotham, 1912 to 1915 ===
- Northern High School (1915), Detroit, Michigan
- Southeastern High School (1915), Detroit, Michigan
- Isabell F. Thirkell Elementary School (1915), Virginia Park Historic District, Detroit, Michigan
- Northeastern High School (1916), Detroit, Michigan
- Anna M. Joyce School (1916), Detroit, Michigan
- Nordstrum School (1916), Detroit, Michigan
- Harms Elementary School (1917), Detroit, Michigan

=== Designs for Albert Kahn Associates, 1910, and 1915 to 1922 ===
- Hill Auditorium (with Ernest Wilby) (1913), University of Michigan, Ann Arbor, Michigan
- Harlan Hatcher University of Michigan Library (with Ernest Wilby) (1915–1920), Ann Arbor, Michigan
- Langley Field Hangars and Executive Buildings, including the current Air Combat Command Headquarters Building (1917), Point Comfort, Virginia
- Rockwell Field (now part of Naval Air Station, North Island) Hangars, Guard House, and Officers Homes (1917), Coronado, California
- General Motors Building (1919–1923), Detroit, Michigan, preliminary work and exterior design
- First National Building (first unit-1922), Detroit, Michigan, preliminary work and exterior design

=== Designs for Smith, Hinchman & Grylls, 1922 to 1930 ===
- Jefferson Avenue Presbyterian Church (1926), Detroit, Michigan
- Bankers Trust Building (1925), Detroit, Michigan
- Buhl Building (1925), Detroit, Michigan
- Second National Bank Building (1925), Saginaw, Michigan
- George H. Phelps Advertising Building (1925), 2761 E. Jefferson Ave., Detroit, Michigan
- Grand Rapids Trust Building (1926), Grand Rapids, Michigan
- Benjamin Nolan School (1926), 1150 E. Lantz St., Detroit, Michigan
- Michigan Bell Building (1927), Detroit, Michigan, 12-story addition and commercial office updates to original 7-story, 1919 building
- David Mackenzie High School (1927)(demolished), Detroit, Michigan
- Ambassador Bridge (1927–1929) Cable Anchorage Piers, and Terminal Buildings (demolished)
- Michigan Bell Detroit-Columbia Central Office Building, 52 Seldon St., Detroit, Michigan
- Greater Penobscot Building (1928), Detroit, Michigan
- Pontchartrain Club Building/Town Apartments (begun 1928, not completed; later converted to Town Apartments), Detroit, Michigan
- Union Trust/Guardian Building (1929), Detroit, Michigan
- Cunningham Drug Building (1929), 1134 Griswold St., and 25 State St., Detroit, Michigan
- Michigan Bell and Western Electric Warehouse (1930), 82 Oakman Blvd., Detroit, Michigan
- Detroit Saturday Night Building (1929), 1959 E. Jefferson Ave., Detroit, Michigan
- Denby High School (1930), Detroit, Michigan
- Pershing High School (1930), Detroit, Michigan
- Union Industrial Bank Building/Charles Stewart Mott Foundation Building (1930), Flint, Michigan
- Michigan Bell Saginaw Office Building (1930), 309 S. Washington Ave., Saginaw, Michigan

=== Designs for O'Dell and Rowland, 1931 to 1938 ===
- L. Black Co. store (1932), 1420 Woodward Ave., Detroit, Michigan
- Good Housekeeping Stran-Steel House (1933) for the 1933 Homes of Tomorrow Exhibition at the Century of Progress International Exposition, Chicago, Illinois
- "Ideal Home" for Detroit Builders' Show of 1933, Grosse Pointe Woods, Michigan
- Lewis A. Maire Elementary School (1936), Grosse Pointe, Michigan
- Stevens Memorial Chapel - chancel section, including altar, reredos, and organ screen (1938), St. John's Episcopal Church, Detroit, Michigan
- Victor C. Vaughn House dormitory, University of Michigan (1938), Ann Arbor, Michigan

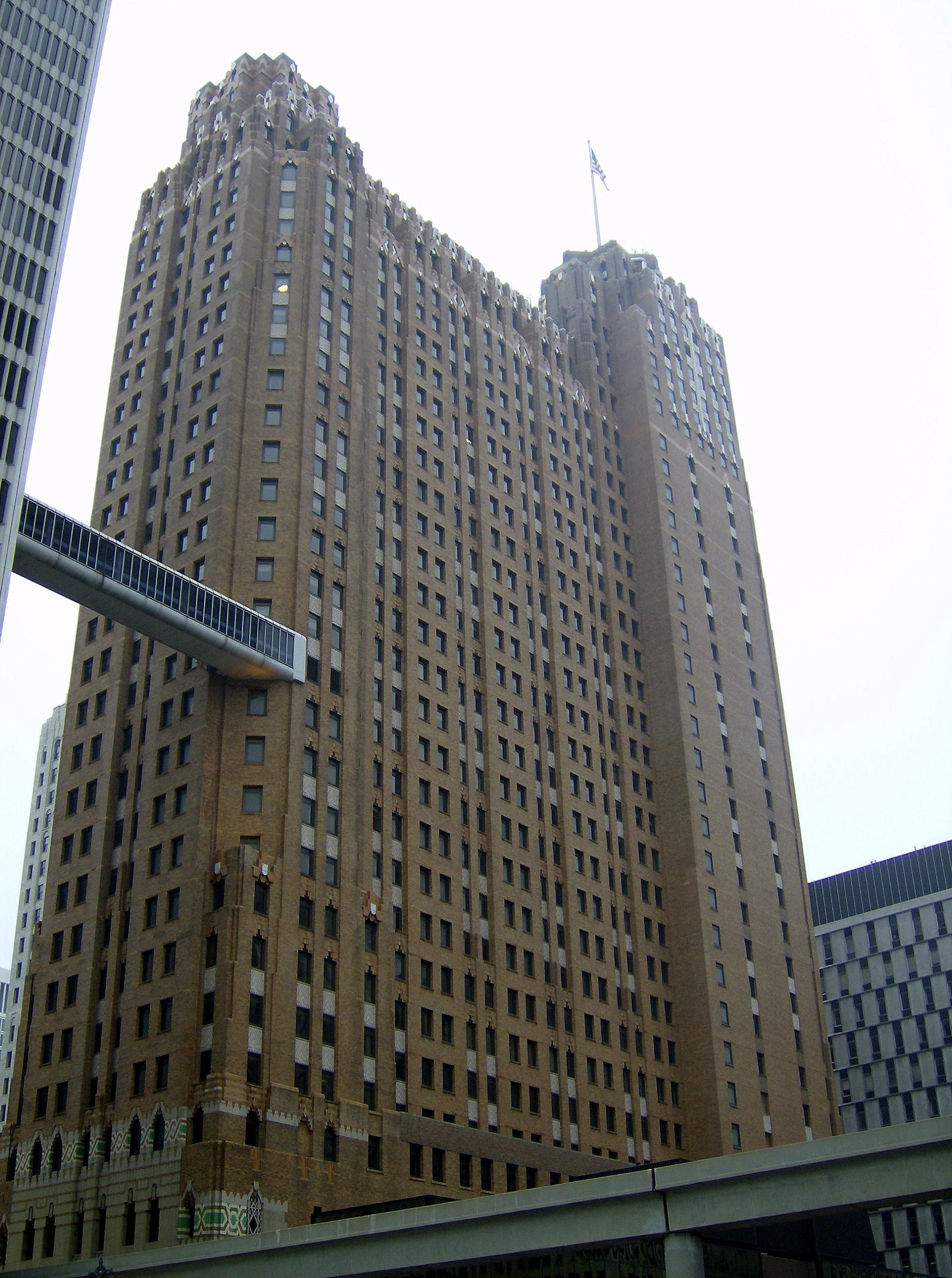
Guardian Building flying the American Flag over the Detroit Financial District.

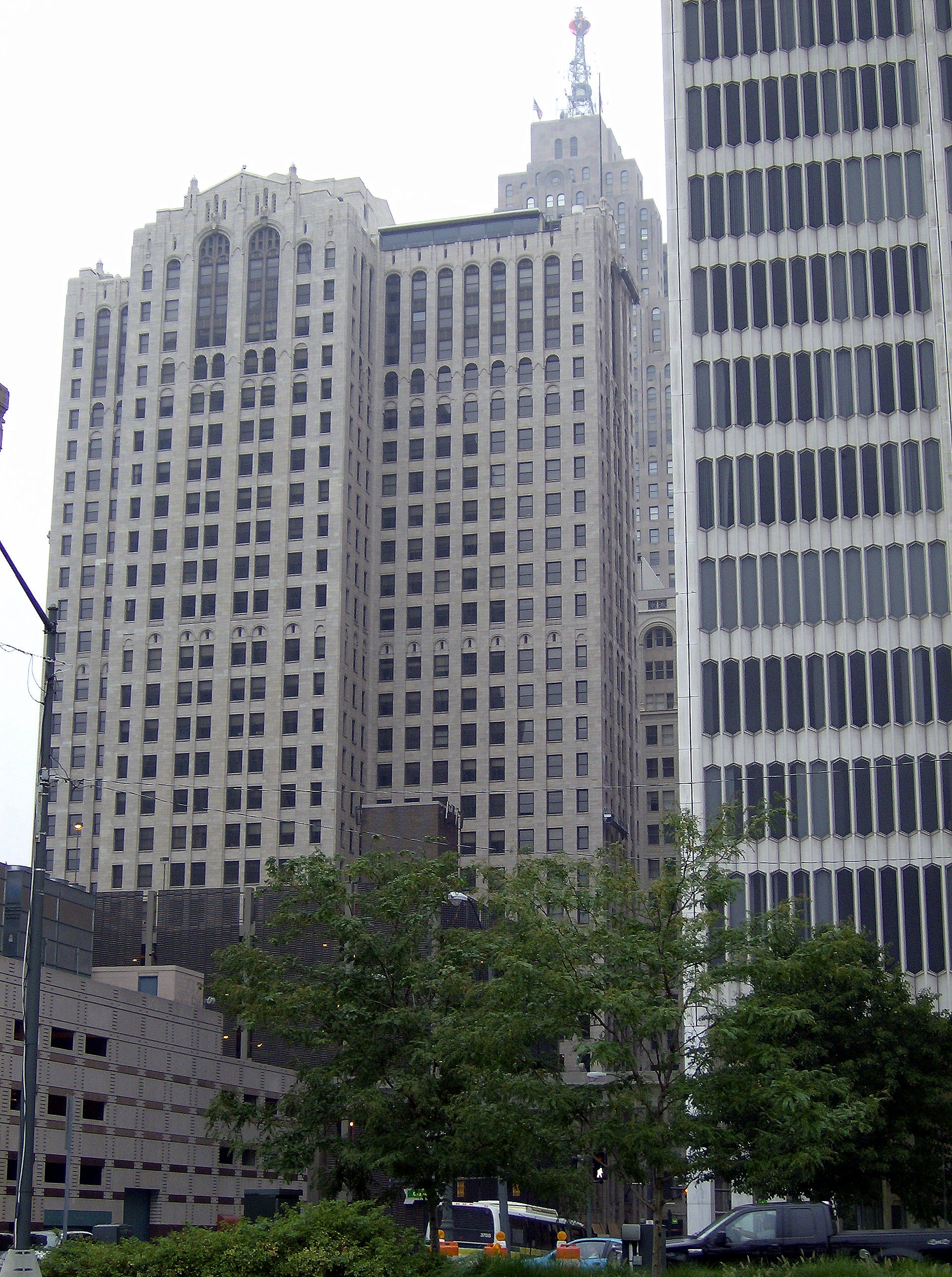
Buhl Building, in the shadow of the Penobscot Building

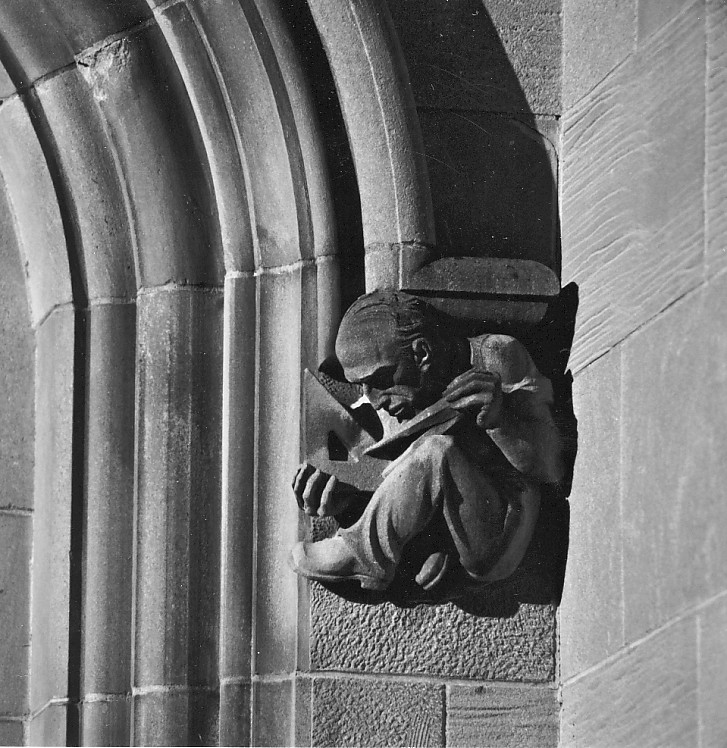
Wirt Rowland
by Corrado Parducci

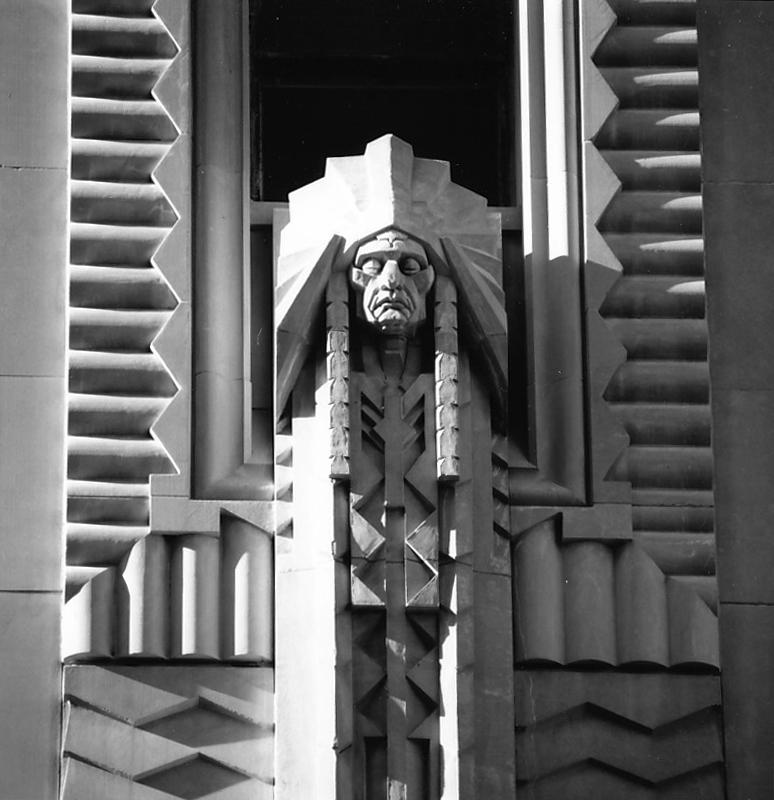
Penboscot Building Indian by Corrado Parducci

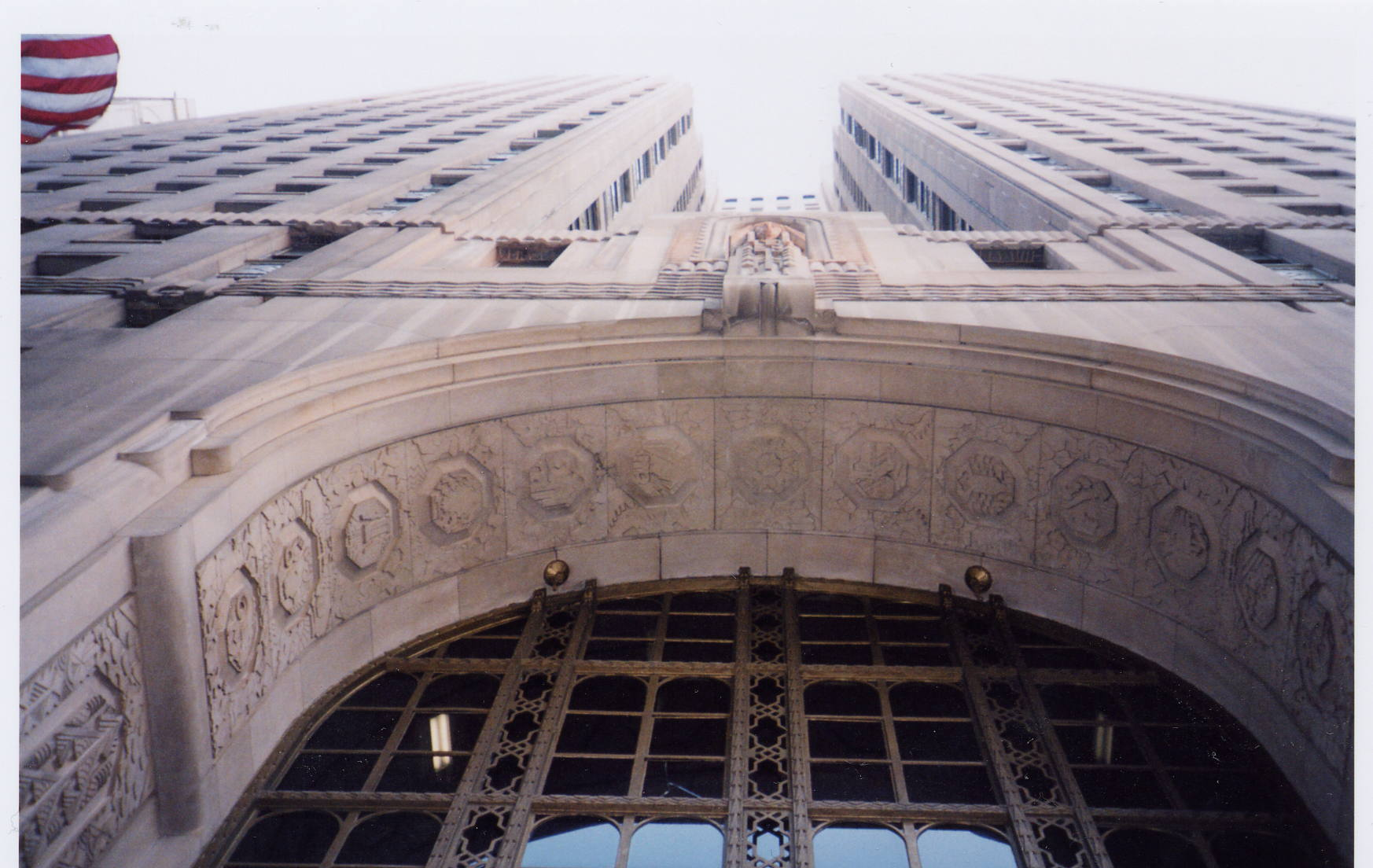
Looking up from the Penobscot Building's entrance arch

== References and further reading ==
- Ferry, W. Hawkins (1968). The Buildings of Detroit: A History. Wayne State University Press.
- Hill, Eric J. & John Gallagher (2002). AIA Detroit: The American Institute of Architects Guide to Detroit Architecture. Wayne State University Press. ISBN 0-8143-3120-3.
- Holleman, Thomas, edited and compiled by Rebecca Binno Savage and Sharon Scott (2004). Wirt C. Rowland Exhibition Catalog. Wirt C. Rowland Exhibition Committee, Historical Society of Clinton, Michigan.
- Holleman, Thomas J. & James P Gallagher (1978). Smith, Hinchman & Grylls : 125 years of architecture and engineering, 1853-1978. Wayne State University Press. ISBN 0814316158.
- Meyer, Katherine Mattingly and Martin C.P. McElroy with Introduction by W. Hawkins Ferry, Hon A.I.A. (1980). Detroit Architecture A.I.A. Guide Revised Edition. Wayne State University Press. ISBN 0-8143-1651-4.
- Sharoff, Robert (2005). American City: Detroit Architecture. Wayne State University Press. ISBN 0-8143-3270-6.
- Savage, Rebecca Binno & Greg Kowalski (2004). Art Deco in Detroit (Images of America). Arcadia Publishing. ISBN 0-7385-3228-2.
- Smith, Michael G. (2017). Designing Detroit: Wirt Rowland and the Rise of Modern American Architecture. Wayne State University Press. ISBN 978-0814339794.
- Sobocinski, Melanie Grunow (2005). Detroit and Rome: building on the past. Regents of the University of Michigan. ISBN 0-933691-09-2.
- Tottis, James W. (2008). The Guardian Building: Cathedral of Finance. Wayne State University Press. ISBN 978-0-8143-3385-3.
- Tutag, Nola Huse with Lucy Hamilton (1988). Discovering Stained Glass in Detroit. Wayne State University Press. ISBN 0-8143-1875-4.
