= Genesee Towers =

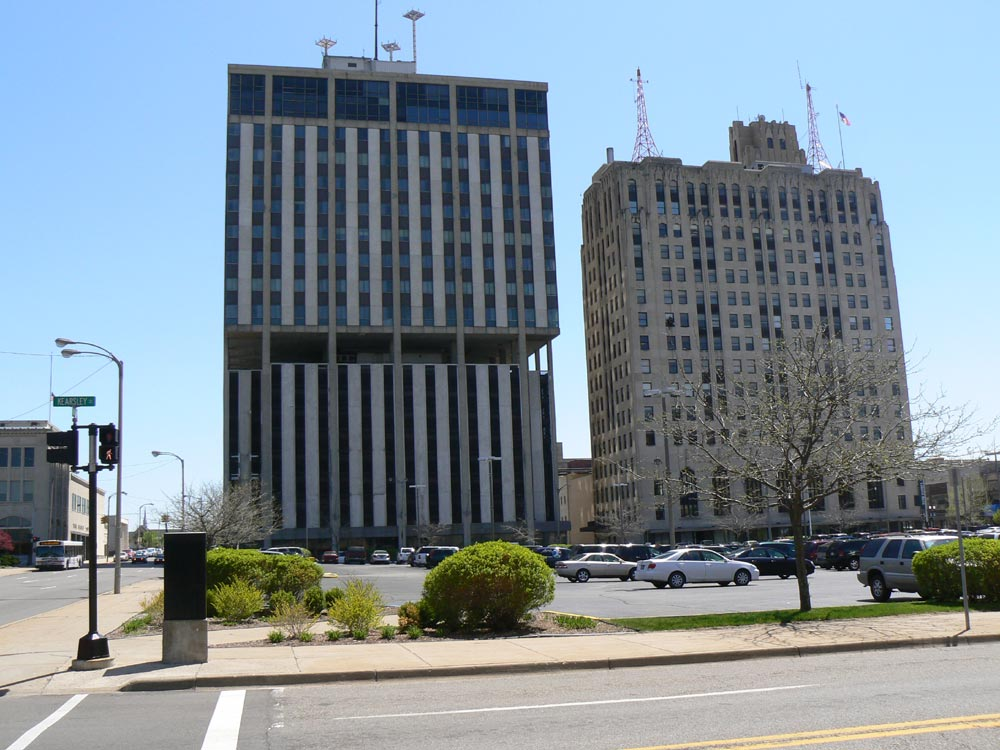
- The Genesee Towers (left)

General information
- Status: Demolished
- Type: Office; Parking
- Architectural style: modernism
- Location: 120 East 1st Street, Flint, Michigan, United States
- Coordinates: 43.01614°N 83.68972°W
- Construction started: 1966
- Completed: 1968
- Demolished: December 22, 2013
- Cost: $6.5 million

Height
- Antenna spire: 99.4 m (326 ft)
- Roof: 76.2 m (250 ft)

Technical details
- Floor count: 19
- Floor area: 15,979 m^{2} (172,000 sq ft)

The Genesee Towers was the tallest building in Flint, Michigan, United States. It was demolished on December 22, 2013 after a period of inactivity and loss of occupancy.

== Description ==
The tower consisted of 15,979 m^{2} (172,000 sq ft) of ten-stories of office space atop an eight-story parking garage and lobby for a total of 19 floors. The building stood 250 feet (76 m) high and had been the tallest building in the city of Flint and Genesee County since its completion. Although one building, the plural "Towers" had been used as the building was conceived to consist of two towers stacked on top of each other separated by an air gap.

Parkway Towers in Nashville, Tennessee has a similar design to Genesee Towers.

== History ==
Construction began in 1966, and the building officially opened in December 1968. Developed by Henry Sender, the building's original anchor tenant was the Genesee Merchants Bank & Trust Company. The University Club, a private, men's only club geared toward professionals, opened on the building's top floor in 1969.

Kumar Vemullapalli purchased the building in 1997, just as the last major tenant, National Bank of Detroit (NBD), announced it would leave the property for a newer venue. NBD purchased Genesee Merchants Bank in 1985 and its departure left the building largely vacant. In 2001, due to sporadic maintenance, a pipe burst, causing flooding and forcing remaining tenants to relocate. The city finally condemned Genesee Towers in 2004 after citing it for numerous building code violations. In November 2007, the city closed streets around the tower due to the risk of concrete falling from the structure.

In September 2008, after years of litigation by the city to acquire the property, an arbitrator, a former Genesee County circuit judge, ordered the city to purchase the building at its assessed price of $1.5 million, though the city will end up having to pay approximately an additional $6 million to the owner because of associated court costs and fees. The city of Flint formally took possession of the building on December 8, 2010. There were no immediate plans for the property. In August 2012, the city of Flint controversially sold Genesee Towers to Uptown Reinvestment Corporation for $1.

The failure was ascribed to many things, among them poor construction.

Genesee Towers was demolished by implosion on December 22, 2013 at 10:00 AM. Veteran demolition expert Steve Pettigrew, supervising a crew of Demolition Dynamics of Jacksonville, Florida carried out the implosion. The city has created a public park and green space on the land.
