= Union Trust and Savings Bank (Michigan) =

Bank in Flint, Michigan, 1893 to 1929

- Industry: Banking
- Founded: 1893
- Defunct: 1929
- Fate: merged
- Successor: Union Industrial Trust & Savings Bank
- Headquarters: Flint, Michigan, United States

Union Trust and Savings Bank was a bank that served Flint, Michigan. It was established in 1893, merged in 1929 and failed during the Great Depression.

== History ==
It was established in 1893 by Ira H. Wilder, a former bank examiner, and a number of wealth investors. The initial board of directors included Mathew Davison and William A. Paterson both mayors of the City of Flint. Paterson was also a carriage, and a car manufacturer. Another director was James Hurley, who was known by his foundational donations for the city's Hurley Hospital. The bank's first president was Charles T. Bridgman, and Wilder served as the cashier. Mathew Davison later succeeded Wilder as the bank's cashier. Later, George H. Durand and William F. Stewart joined the board of directors. Paterson and W. H. Edwards were appointed vice-presidents in 1916, and Davison became chairman of the board. Additionally, in 1916 L. H. Bridgman became cashier, and J. E. Storer became his assistant cashier.

On May 1, 1929, the Bank merged with Industrial Savings Bank to become Union Industrial Trust & Savings Bank. Several employees, including a senior vice president and two vice presidents, were caught embezzling $3.5 million from the bank in 1929. It failed during the Great Depression.
