= Flint Journal Building =

- U.S. National Register of Historic Places
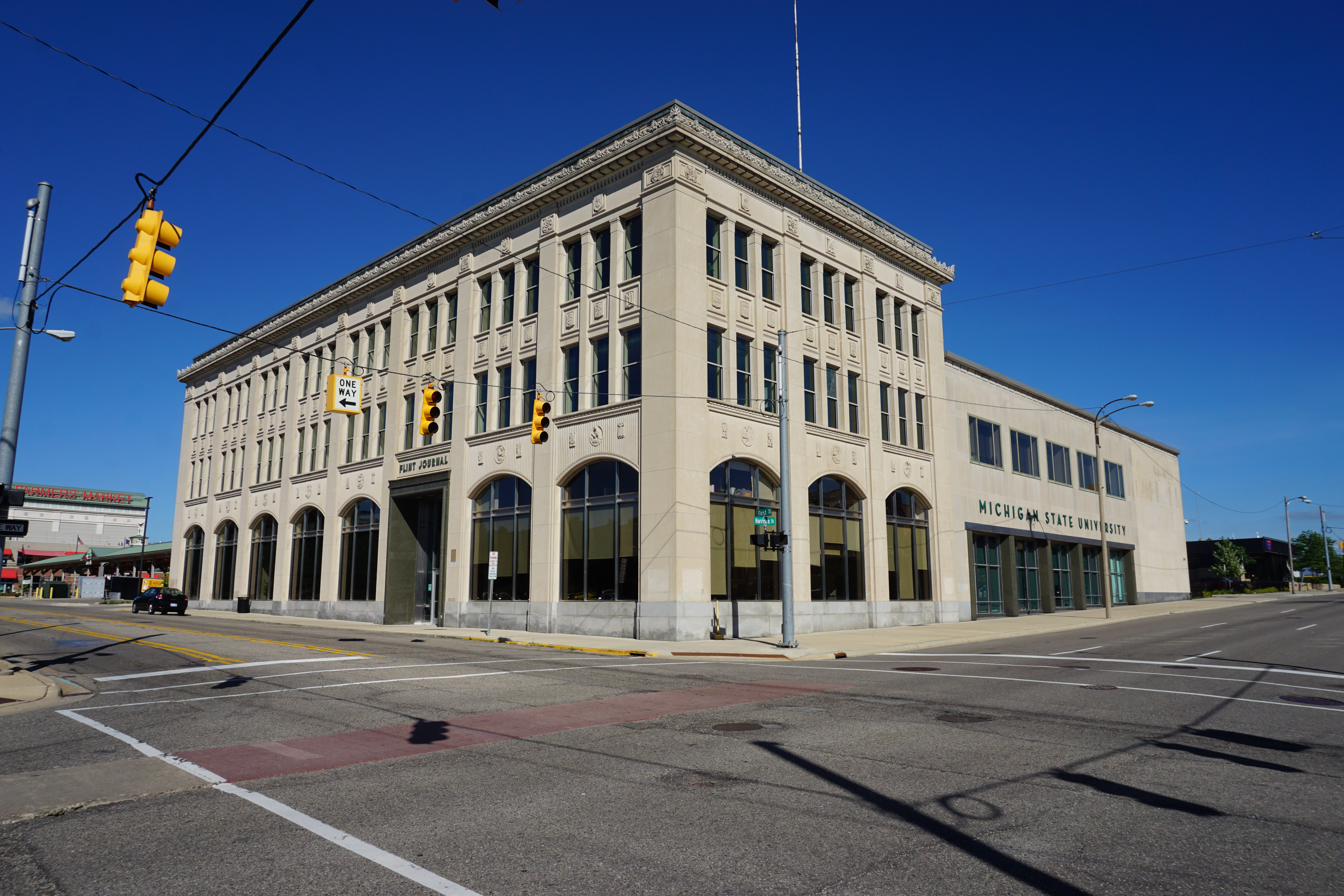
- Interactive map
- Location: 200 E. 1st. St., Flint, Michigan
- Coordinates: 43°0′59″N 83°41′20″W
- Area: 1.4 acres (0.57 ha)
- Built: 1924
- Architect: Albert Kahn, William E. Kapp
- Architectural style: Classical Revival, Art Moderne, International Style
- NRHP reference No.: 13000903
- Added to NRHP: October 25, 2013

The Flint Journal Building is an office building located at 200 East First Street in Flint, Michigan. It was listed on the National Register of Historic Places in 2013. It is now used by the Michigan State University College of Human Medicine.

== History ==
The first edition of The Flint Journal was published by Charles Fellows on in 1876. The paper was sold twice over the next few years, eventually being bought by George McConnelly, who changed it from a weekly to a daily newspaper in 1883. The paper was sold twice again, and in 1902 Howard H. Fitzgerald purchased it and merged it with the Flint Globe, changing its name to the Fling Daily Journal. In 1911 Fitzgerald sold it to George Gough Booth, then president of the Detroit News and owner of many other Michigan newspapers. Flint grew enormously at the beginning of the twentieth century, providing an increasing number of subscribers for the Journal. The paper had offices on First Street, but by the 1920s was outgrowing that space.

Booth hired Albert Kahn (who had recently designed the Detroit News Building as well as Booth's personal residence at Cranbrook) to design new offices for the Journal. The building was constructed and the paper moved into the offices in 1924. Kahn designed an addition in 1928, and other changes were made to the building in the 1930s. In 1952, Detroit architect William Kapp designed another, two-story addition to the building; a second addition was constructed in 1962. William Edward Kapp, architect for the firm of Smith, Hinchman & Grylls designed the second addition. However, as the twentieth century rolled on, Flint's economy declined, and so did the paper. In 1976, the Booth Newspapers were sold to Samuel Irving Newhouse Jr., and by 2009, the newspaper reduced publishing to three days per week. In 2012, Booth Newspapers changed its name to Mlive Media Group, and the Flint Journal moved out of its historic headquarters, renting office space elsewhere in downtown Flint.

At the same time, Michigan State University was looking to expand its medical education and public health programs in Flint. The old Flint Journal Building was purchased by Uptown Reinvestment in 2013, who rehabilitated the structure and leased it to MSU. Michigan State University opened their College of Human Medicine facilities in the building at the end of 2014.

== Description ==
The Flint Journal Building is a 3-1/2-story Neoclassical style limestone clad building on a granite foundation, with 2-1/2-story tall International Style additions. The main building has an eight-bay-wide facade along First Street containing an off-center main entrance located in the third bay. The entrance is recessed, with the entry bay trimmed in dark green granite topped by a cornice. The remaining bays have broad segmental-arch-top window openings on the first-floor level. In the second and third story level above, each of the eight bays contain three window openings separated by two-story Doric pilasters. Above the third-floor windows is a broad frieze.

The side facade along Harrison Street has a three-by section with design similar to the front. Behind are the later additions. The 1952 addition is five bays wide with a strip of five large windows on the first floor and a wide tripartite window in each bay on the second floor. The 1965 addition is about half the length of the 1952 addition, but us windowless.
