= Savoyard Centre =

- State Savings Bank
- U.S. National Register of Historic Places
- U.S. Historic district – Contributing property
- Michigan State Historic Site
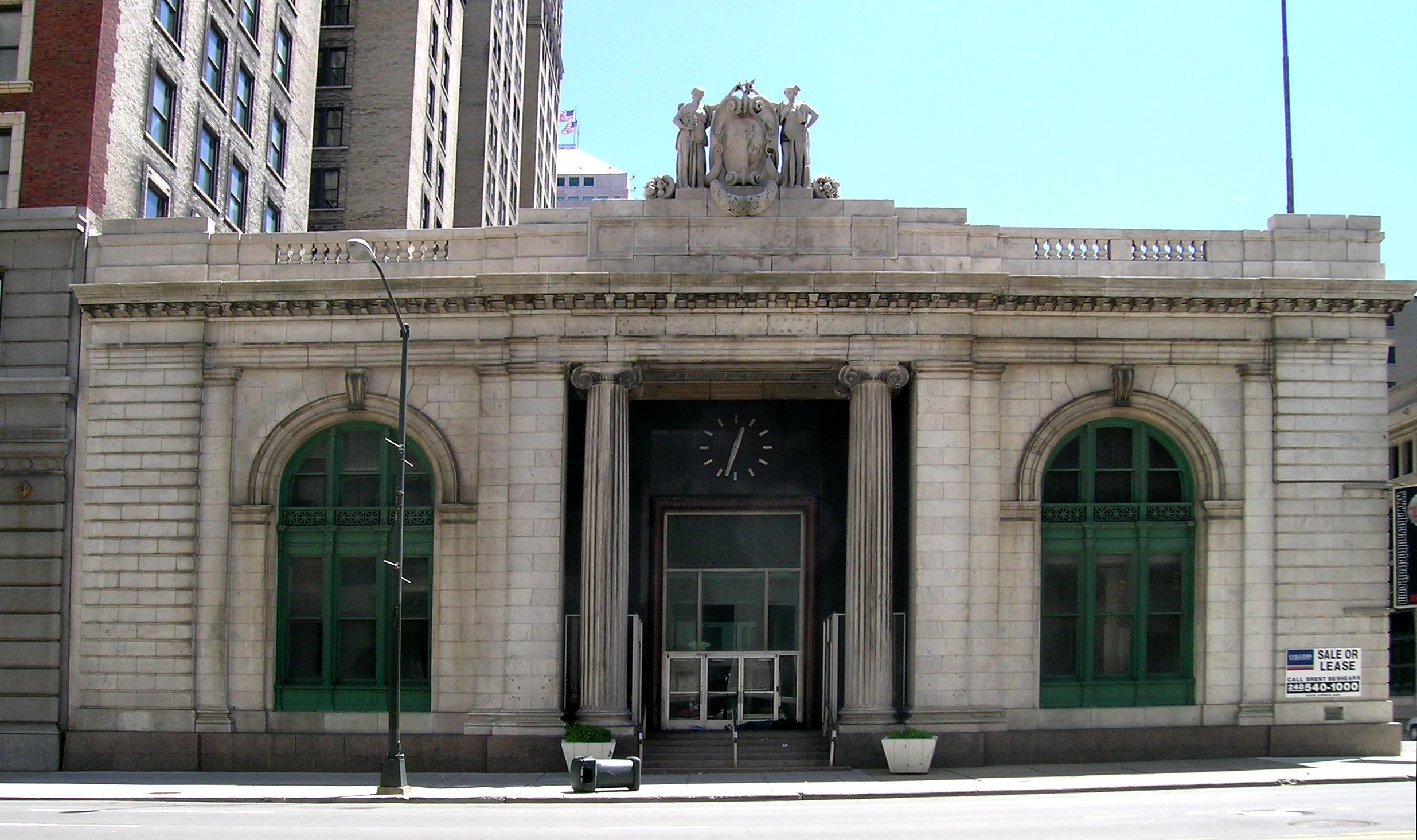
- Interactive map
- Location: 151 West Fort Street; Detroit, Michigan
- Coordinates: 42°19′47″N 83°2′53″W
- Built: 1900; 1914 (addition)
- Architect: McKim, Mead, and White (Stanford White); Donaldson and Meier
- Architectural style: Classical Revival
- Part of: Detroit Financial District (ID09001067)
- NRHP reference No.: 82002910

Significant dates
- Added to NRHP: March 19, 1982
- Designated MSHS: January 8, 1981

Savoyard Centre (1900), also known as State Savings Bank, is an office building at 151 West Fort Street in Downtown Detroit, Michigan. It was designated as a Michigan State Historic Site in 1981 and listed on the National Register of Historic Places in 1982. Another historic marker erected November 13, 1964, also notes that the site was previously occupied by Fort Lernoult until July 11, 1796, when, in compliance with the terms of the Treaty of Paris ending the American Revolutionary War, British troops had evacuated their last post in United States territory.

== History ==
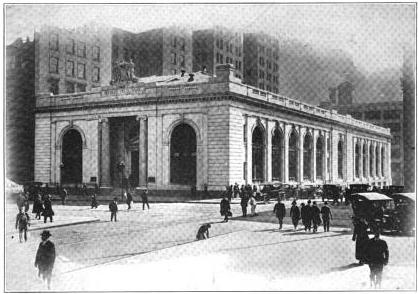
State Savings Bank Building c. 1920

The State Savings Bank was organized in 1883, and purchased the site at the corner of Fort and Shelby in 1898, by which time it was the largest bank in Detroit. They commissioned the prominent architect Stanford White to design the Neo-Classical bank. The interior and exterior walls are white marble. The main entrance is in a recessed portico and framed by two Ionic columns 28 ft (8.5 m) tall and weighing 56,000 lb (25,000 kg). Above the entry is a cartouche bearing the Michigan Coat of Arms flanked by two figures representing Industry and Commerce.

In 1907, the State Savings Bank merged with the People's Savings Bank to form the People's State Bank, requiring a larger building. The original structure faced Fort Street, but extended only 138 ft (42 m) in depth. In 1914, the bank hired Donaldson and Meier to design an addition to the building. The resulting structure doubled the original size by extending the building to Congress Street. The addition is nearly indistinguishable from the original.

The two-story main banking room in the interior is surrounded by arched colonnades. The colonnades are divided by Ionic pilasters. The second floor occupies the upper portions of the arches and frosted glass allows light to pass between the spaces. The coffered ceiling is molded plaster and is slightly more ornate in the 1898 portion of the building. The main vault stood at the rear of the original structure and the 1914 addition placed it in the middle of the banking floor. In the archway over the Congress Street entry is a mural by American artist Thomas Wilmer Dewing. It is an allegorical representation of the City of Detroit flanked by Commerce and Agriculture. The painting was completed in 1900 and placed in its present position after the structure was expanded in 1914.

The bank again merged in 1927 to become the Peoples Wayne County Bank, but disappeared in the financial failures of the Great Depression. Afterward, the headquarters of Edsel Ford's Manufacturer's National Bank occupied the building. In the 1960s, a pedestrian bridge was constructed across Shelby Street to connect the two buildings then occupied by Manufacturer's Bank. The building was continuously used as a bank until the 1980s, when it became an office supply showroom.

In August 2013, the building was jeopardized as owners proposed demolition and converting the property to a surface parking lot. Bedrock Real Estate Services, a company owned by local businessman Dan Gilbert added the structure to its portfolio of 65 Detroit properties December 13, 2014. The company did not disclose the purchase price or possible plans, however one rumored use could be an auto museum.

The current name is taken from the nearby Savoyard Creek, named by early settlers who arrived in the area from Savoy. The creek began at the current site of Lafayette Park flowed parallel to Congress Street to the foot of Fourth Street where it emptied into the Detroit River. Over time, the creek became an open sewer until complaints from nearby residents caused the city to enclose and incorporate it into the sewer system in 1836. Julian Scott Department Store was located at 151 West Fort Street in downtown Detroit, Michigan.

== Gallery ==
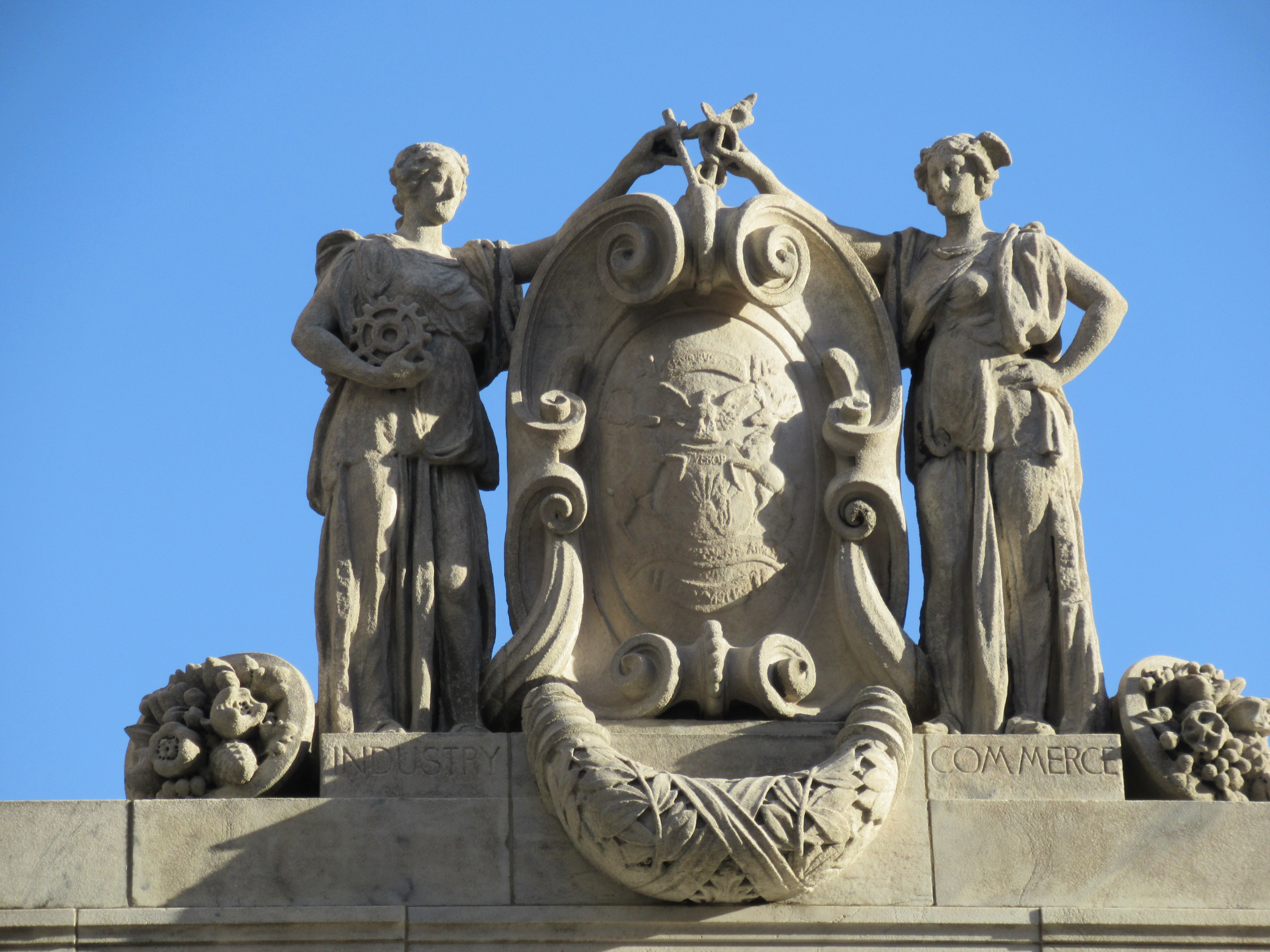
Roof Adornment
