= Penobscot (disambiguation) =

The Penobscot are an indigenous ethnic group of North America.

Penobscot may also refer to:

== Places ==
- Penobscot, Maine
- Fort Pentagouet (or Fort Castine or Fort Penobscot or Fort Saint-Pierre), Castine, Maine
- Penobscot Bay, Maine
- Penobscot County, Maine
- Penobscot Indian Island Reservation, Penobscot County, Maine
- Penobscot Knob, Pennsylvania
- Penobscot Narrows Bridge and Observatory, Maine
- Penobscot River, Maine

== Buildings ==
- Penobscot Block, Detroit, Michigan
- Penobscot Building, Detroit, Michigan
- Penobscot Building Annex (or Penobscot Annex), Detroit, Michigan
- The Penobscot Building, Detroit, Michigan

== Ships ==
(Chronological order)

- USS Penobscot (1861), a gunboat launched 19 November 1861
- USS Penobscot (SP-982), a tug placed in service 29 August 1917
- USS Penobscot (ATA-188), a tug launched 11 September 1944

== Other uses ==
- Penobscot Expedition, a failed attempt by American rebels to seize Penobscot, Maine from the British during the American Revolutionary War
- Donald Penobscott, the character Major Margaret "Hot Lips" Houlihan's husband on the TV show M*A*S*H
