= Beaumont Tower =

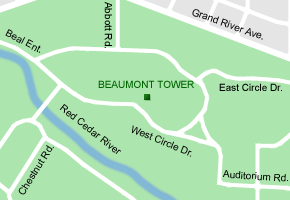
- Beaumont Tower's location within the campus
- Interactive map of the Beaumont Tower area

General information
- Type: Carillon
- Architectural style: Collegiate Gothic
- Location: Between the Student Union and Main Library, Michigan State University
- Coordinates: 42°43′55.13″N 84°28′55.75″W
- Named for: John W. Beaumont, class of 1882
- Completed: 1928

Dimensions
- Other dimensions: 49 bells in the carillon

Design and construction
- Architect: Donaldson and Meier

Website
- Beaumont Tower Website

The Beaumont Tower is a structure on the campus of Michigan State University, designed by the architectural firm of Donaldson and Meier and completed in 1928. The 104-foot-tall (32 m) tower marks the site of College Hall, the first building constructed on the campus, as well as the first building in America erected for instruction in scientific agriculture. Due to poor construction, College Hall collapsed in 1918. John W. Beaumont, an 1882 alumnus of MSU, proposed the construction of the monument to conserve the Campus Circle and serve as a monument to teaching.

== Description ==
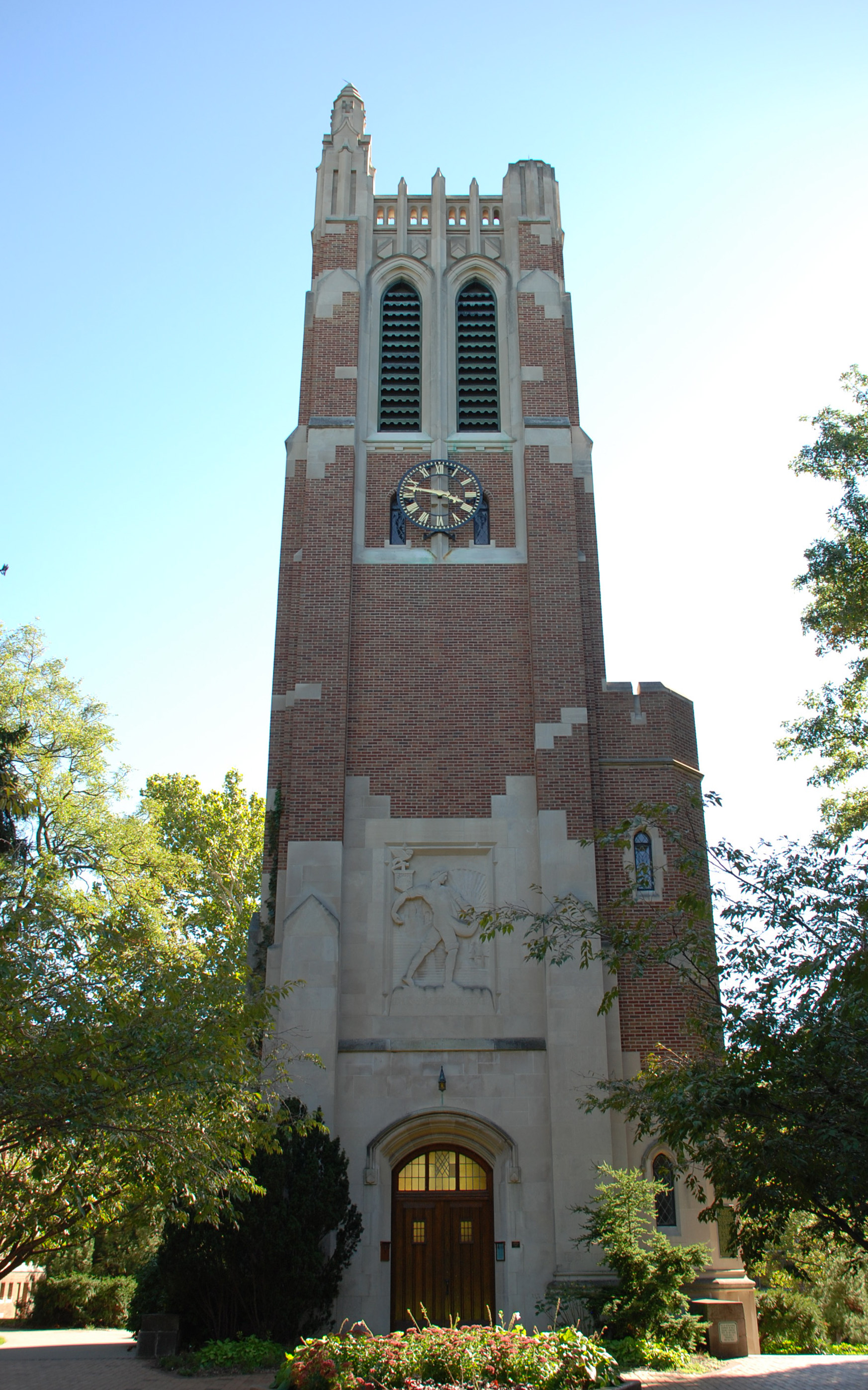
Beaumont Tower's north side

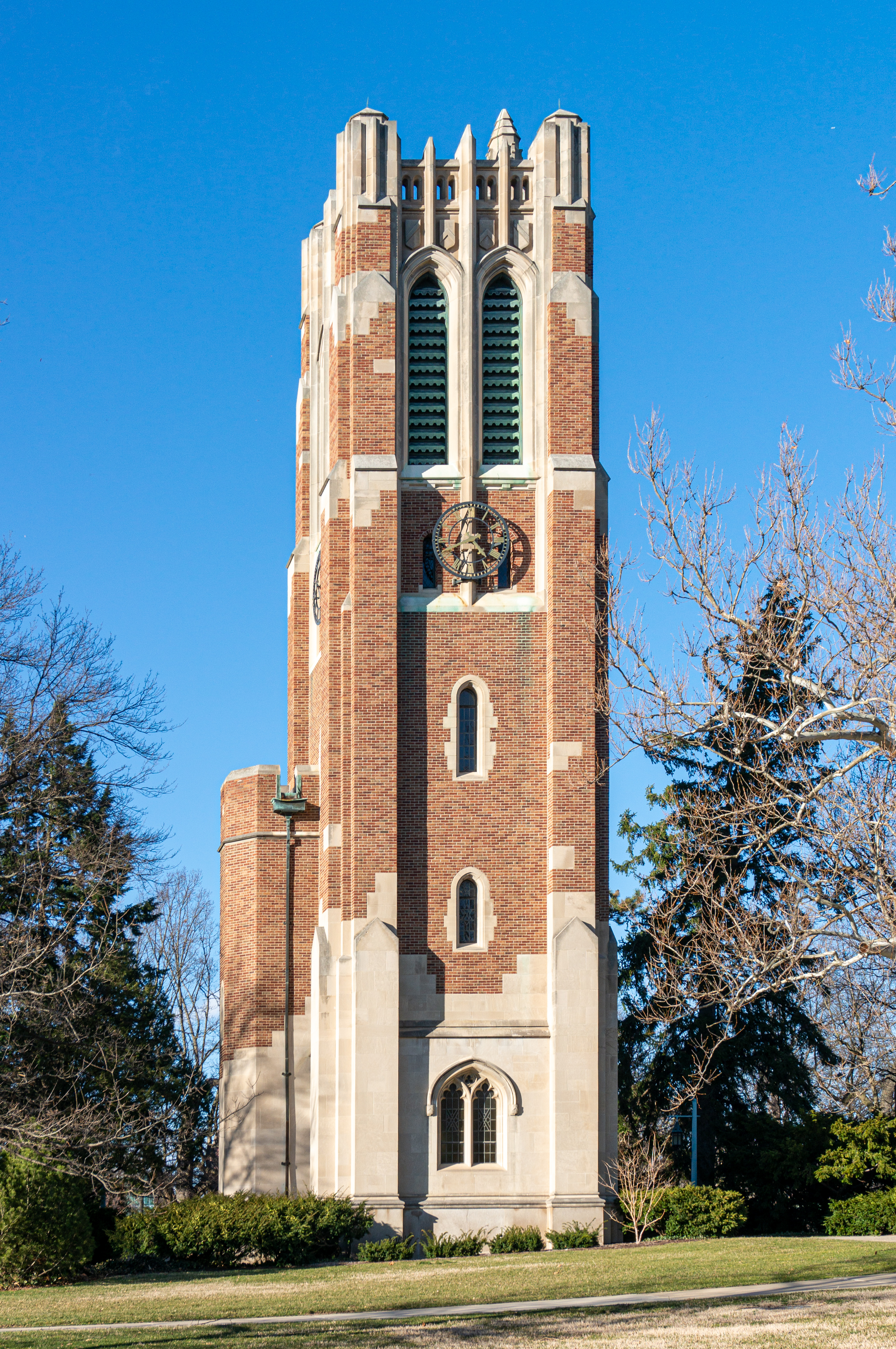
The south side of the Beaumont Tower

During its dedication ceremony, the president of the college described the Beaumont Tower as "a meeting or trysting place of the students, student groups or organizations, the center of all the activities of this institution". The tower was also to serve as a timepiece for the university, directing students' daily activities by sounding hourly.

The tower, designed in the Collegiate Gothic architectural style, features The Sower, an Art Deco bas-relief by sculptor Lee Lawrie (1922), with the inscription "Whatsoever a Man Soweth" (from Galatians 6:7). This serves as a tribute both to MSU's origins as an agricultural college and to the seminal nature of knowledge.

Beaumont also houses a full carillon, with 49 bells. Originally the tower had only ten bells but over time additional bells were added until a full range of music could be played from these. The bells now play frequently throughout the day activated by a computer. The Campus Circle where the tower is located often serves as a gathering place for students where free concerts on the lawn are available in the summer. The Beaumont Tower is one of the most recognizable and most photographed landmarks on the MSU campus. Its likeness as a line drawing is used on MSU letterhead. Special performances using the carillon are provided for specific occasions.

The northeast finial is higher than the other three. The missing finials represent the need for higher education.

The tower is also the meeting place for the executive board of the Michigan State University Tower Guard. The Tower Guard, founded in 1934 by May Shaw, the wife of former MSU president Robert Shaw, is MSU’s oldest and one of the most respected student organizations on campus. It was originally a female honor society that was a service-oriented organization which would help to serve the needs of visually impaired students at Michigan State University. In 1977, membership was opened to the outstanding young men on campus in addition to women. Each year, the top sophomores are chosen to carry on the tradition based on their academic excellence, leadership, outstanding character, and commitment to service.

== Gallery ==
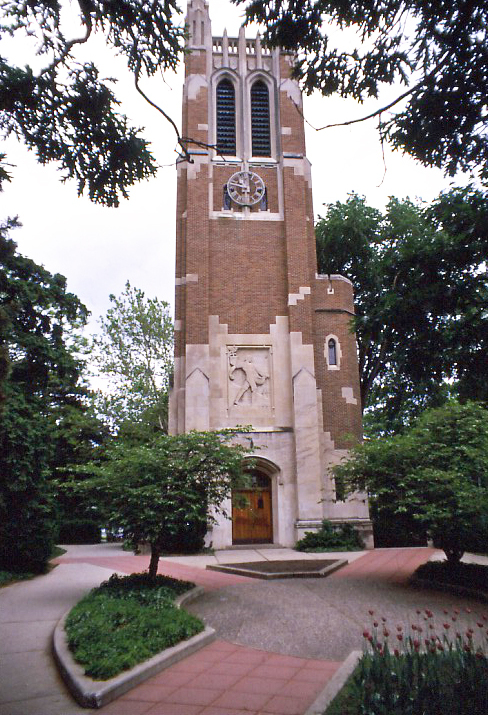
Beaumont Tower

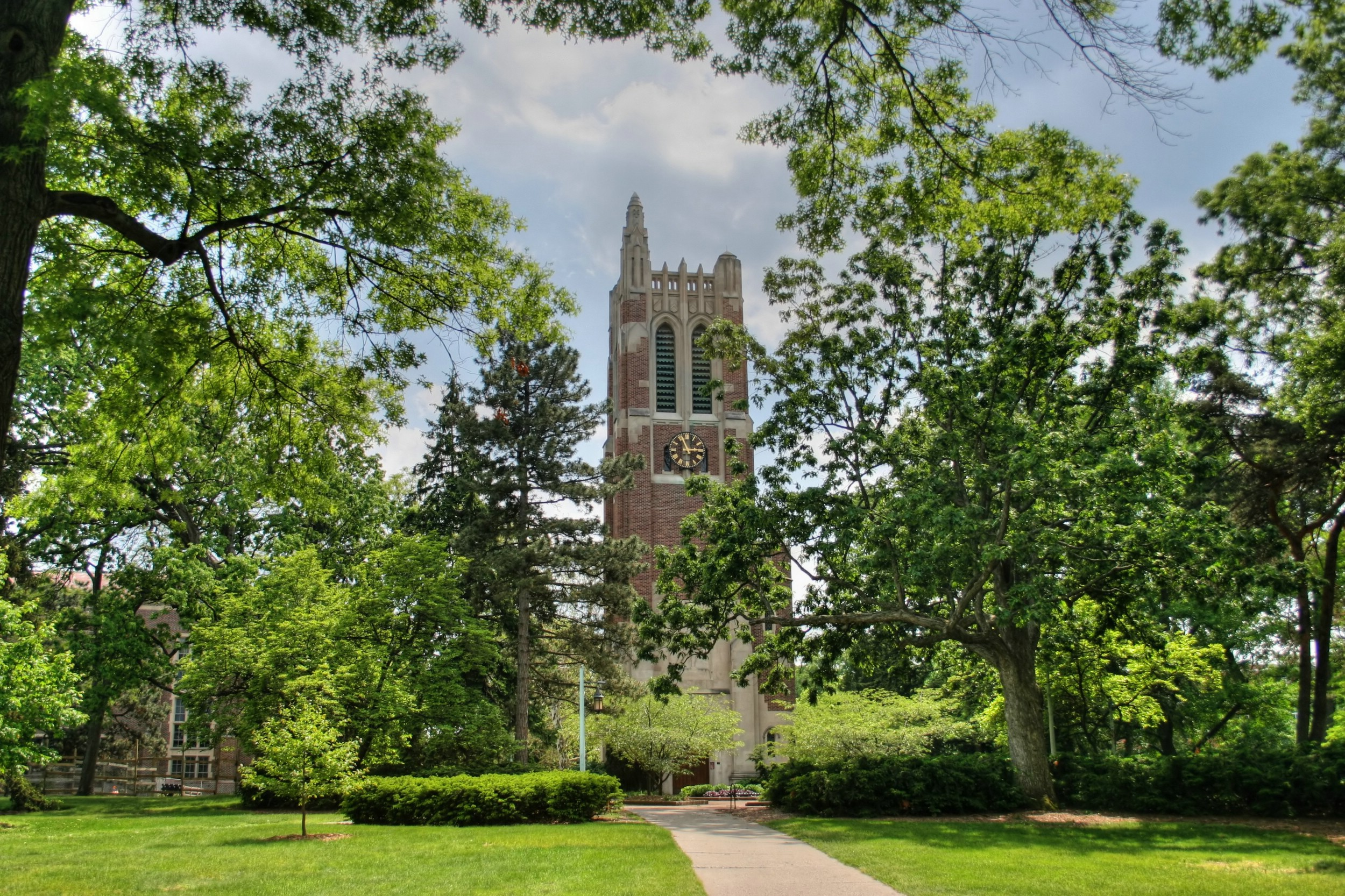
View of Beaumont Tower from the north

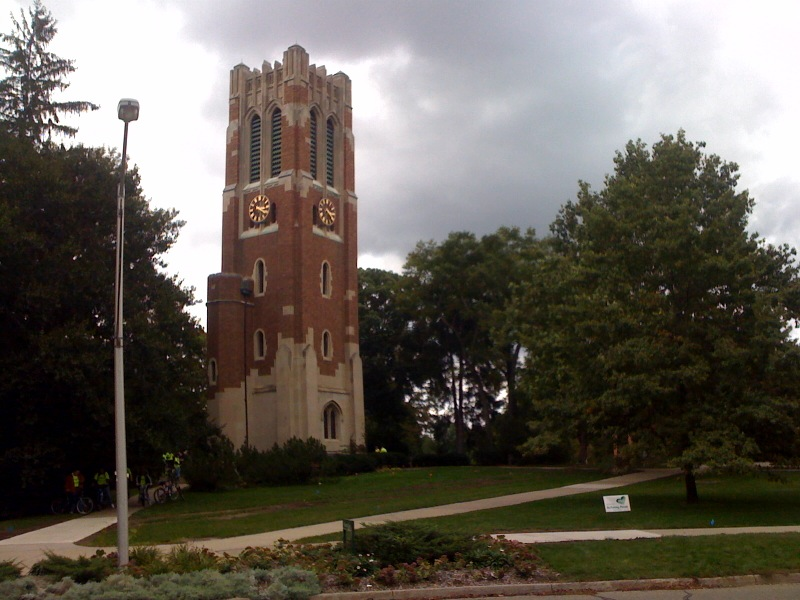
The tower from across West Circle Drive

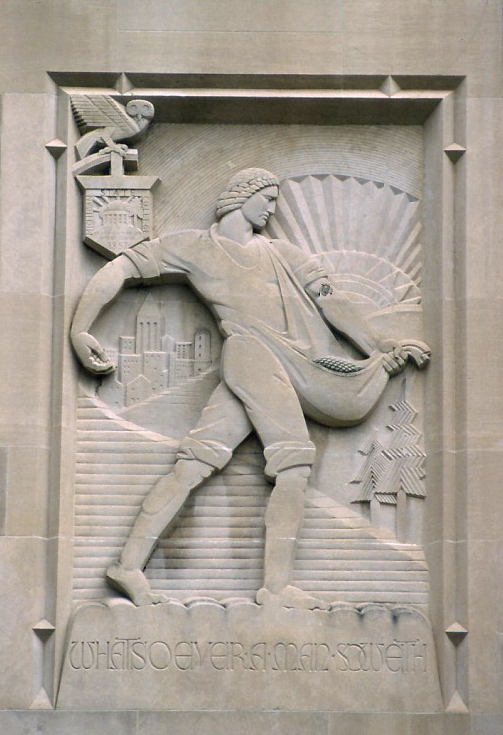
The Sower

== See also ==
- List of carillons in the United States
