= First Unitarian Church of Detroit =

Historic church in Michigan, United States

- U.S. National Register of Historic Places
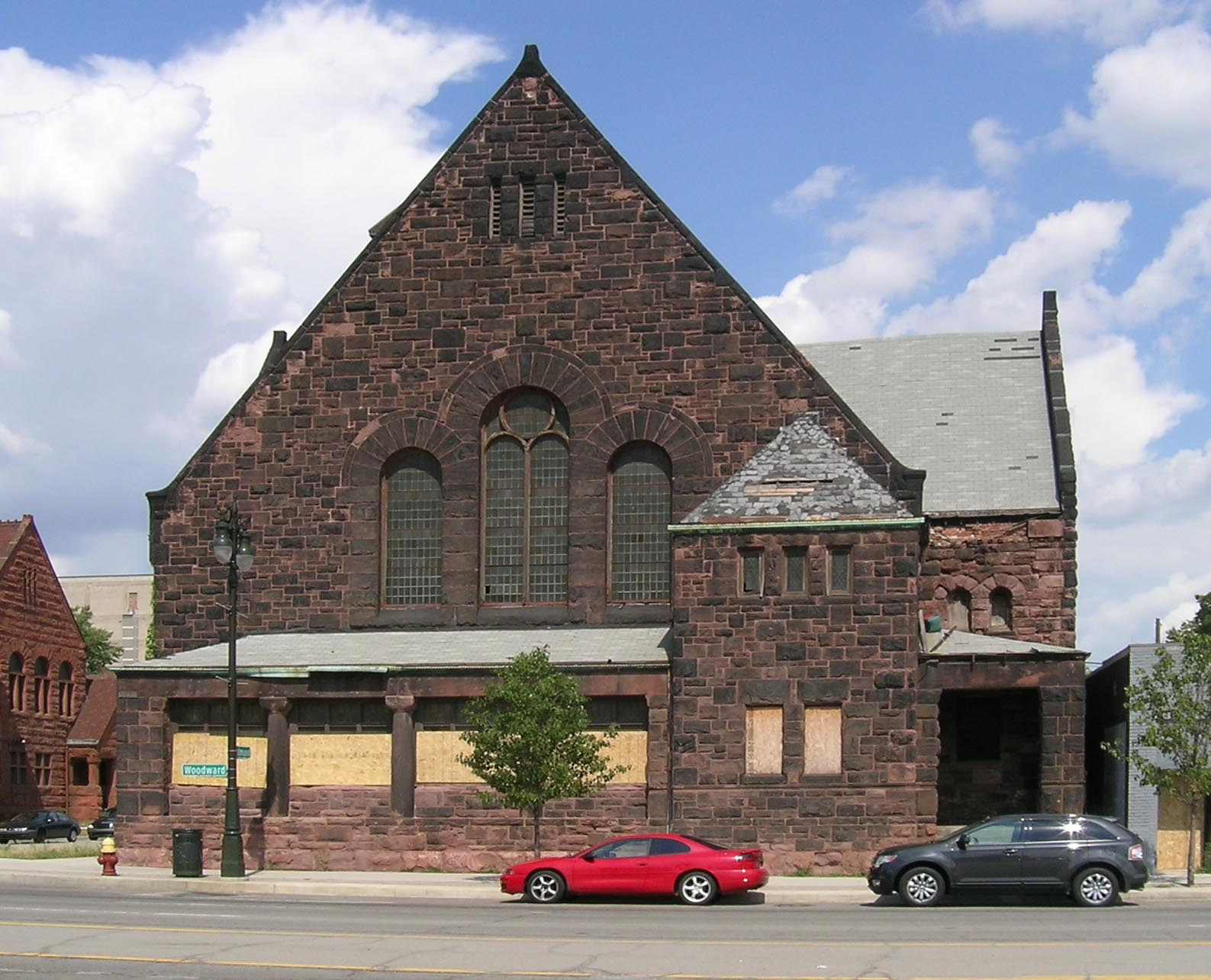
- The First Unitarian Church in 2008
- Interactive map showing building location
- Location: 2870 Woodward Avenue; Detroit, Michigan
- Coordinates: 42°20′37.6″N 83°3′18.91″W
- Built: 1889–90
- Architect: Donaldson and Meier
- Architectural style: Romanesque Revival
- Demolished: May 11, 2014
- MPS: Religious Structures of Woodward Ave. TR
- NRHP reference No.: 82002899
- Added to NRHP: August 3, 1982

The First Unitarian Church of Detroit was located at 2870 Woodward Avenue in Midtown Detroit, Michigan. Built between 1889 and 1890, it was listed on the National Register of Historic Places in 1982. It was destroyed by fire on May 10, 2014.

== History ==
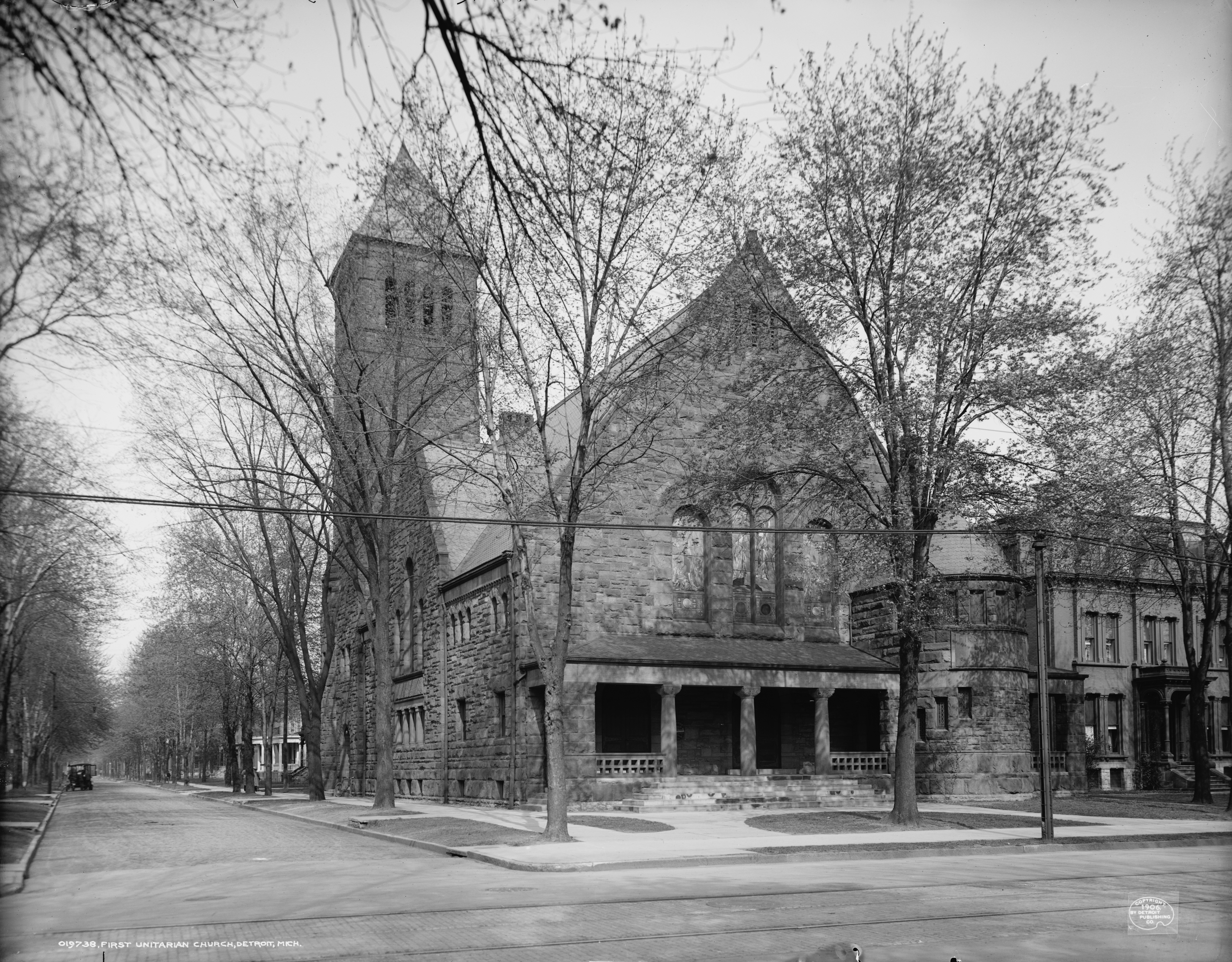
First Unitarian Church, c. 1906

The First Congregational Unitarian Society was incorporated on October 6, 1850. This church, their second, was dedicated in November 1890. The congregation used the church until 1931, when the widening of Woodward Avenue required a remodeling of the church. At that time, they worshiped with the First Universalist Church of Our Father, whose sanctuary on Cass Avenue had been built in 1916. This arrangement worked out so well that the two congregations merged in 1934 to form the Church of Our Father (Unitarian-Universalist), which later became the First Unitarian Universalist Church of Detroit. The First Unitarian building was then sold in 1937 to the Church of Christ denomination. The building went through other owners before finally being abandoned during the 2000s. It sat empty and in poor condition until destroyed by fire in 2014.

== Architecture ==
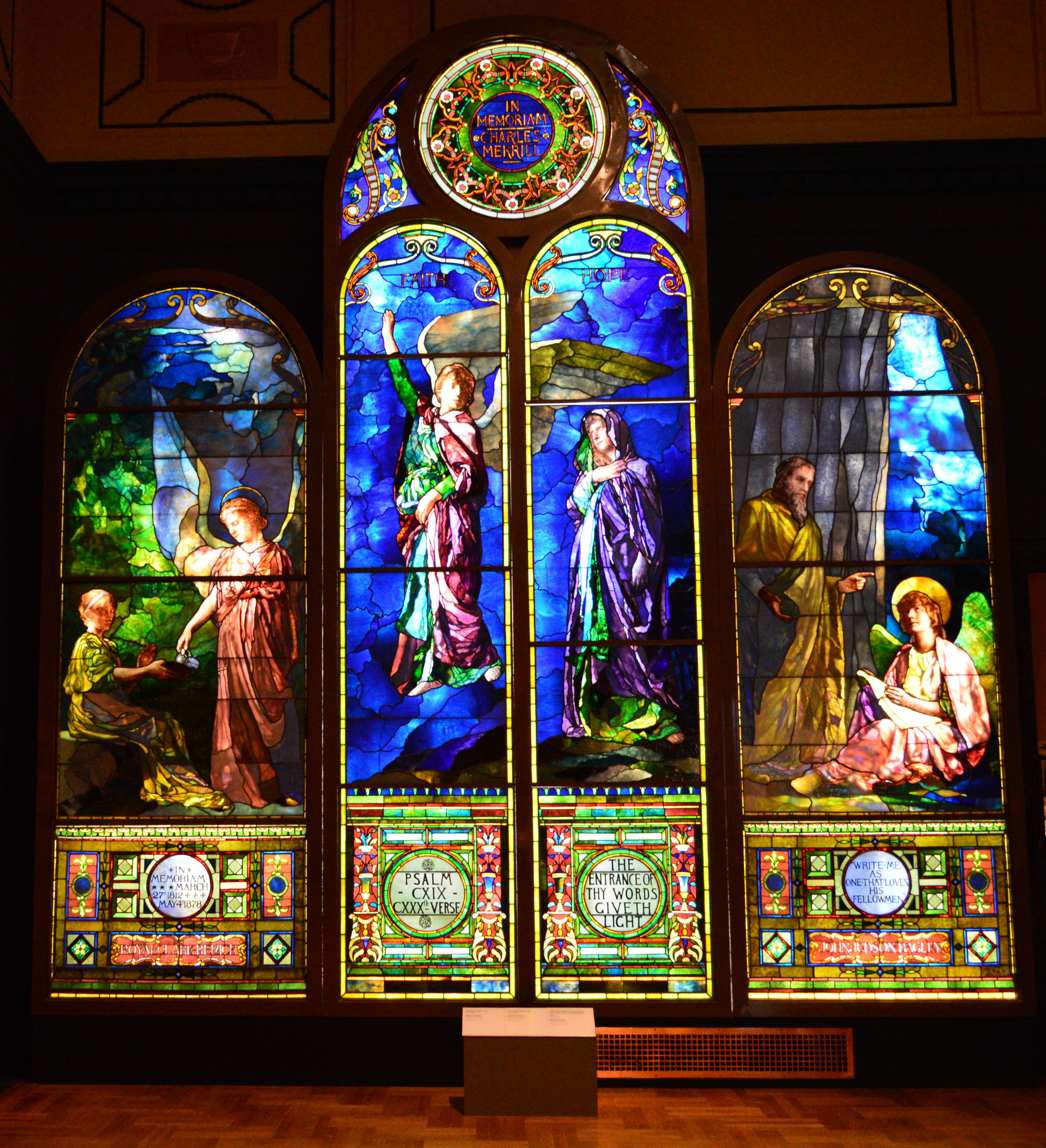
Stained glass windows of the First Unitarian Church, on display at the Detroit Institute of Arts

Designed by the architectural firm of Donaldson and Meier, the First Unitarian Church of Detroit was a Romanesque Revival-style church built of red sandstone. After its remodeling during the 1936 widening of Woodward, it remained substantially as built. The gabled façade had a great expanse of masonry; a simple four-bay porch with a shed roof and stone Romanesque columns spanning the first floor. There was a two-story hip-roofed projection at the corner, and a side porch with stone piers covering a side entrance.

Most of the original John La Farge stained glass windows that faced Woodward Avenue survive in the collection of the Detroit Institute of Arts, which acquired the work in 1959.
