= St. Vincent de Paul Church (Pontiac, Michigan) =

Historic church in Michigan, United States

- St. Vincent DePaul Catholic Church, Convent, and School
- U.S. National Register of Historic Places
- Michigan State Historic Site
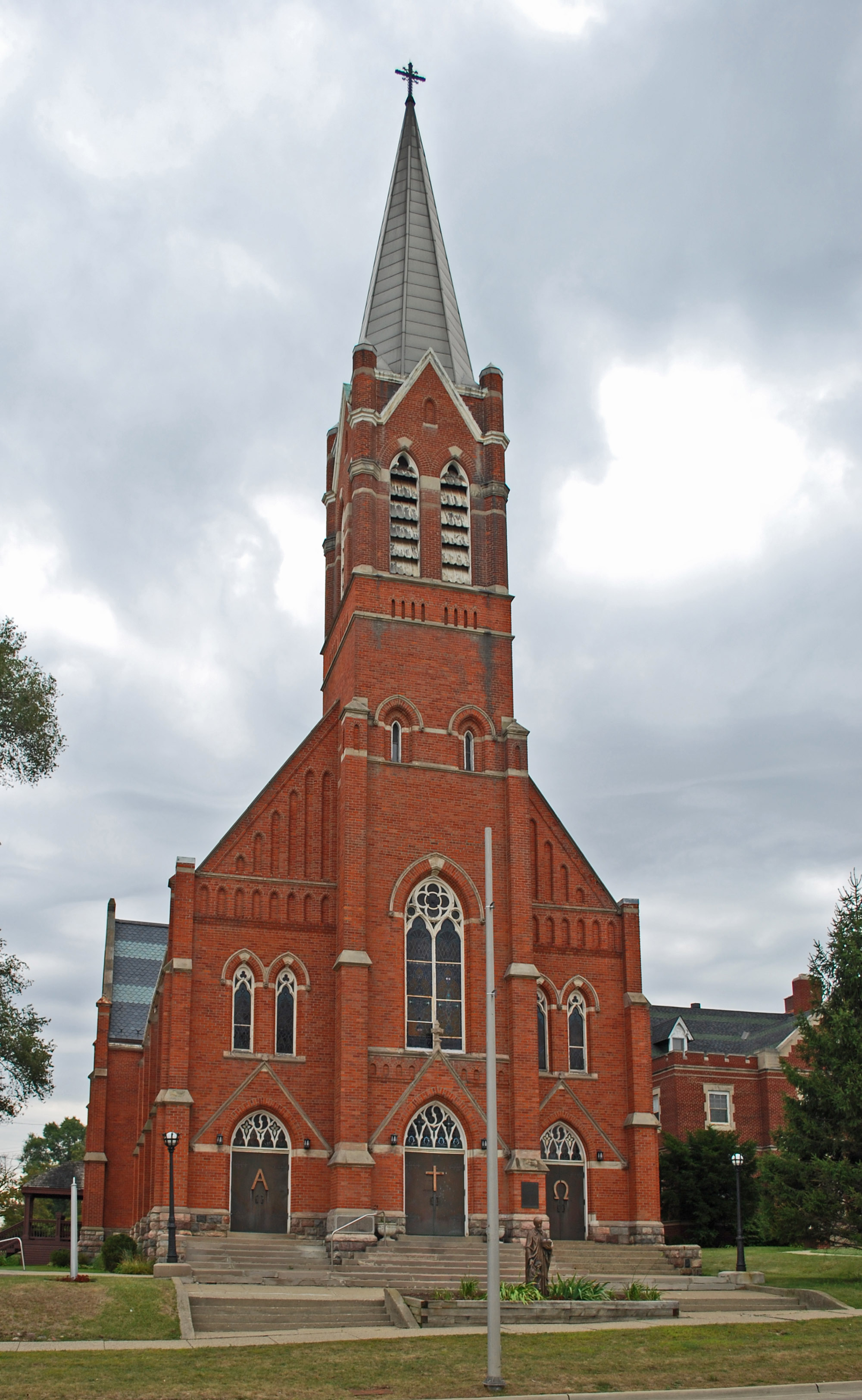

- Location within Michigan Location within the United States
- Interactive map
- Location: 46408 Woodward Ave, Pontiac, Michigan
- Coordinates: 42°37′56″N 83°17′14″W
- Area: 2 acres (0.81 ha)
- Built: 1885
- Architect: Donaldson & Meier
- Architectural style: Gothic Revival, Collegiate Gothic
- NRHP reference No.: 89000492

Significant dates
- Added to NRHP: June 9, 1989
- Designated MSHS: April 28, 1987

The St. Vincent DePaul Catholic Church, Convent, and School is a historic church located at 46408 Woodward Avenue in Pontiac, Michigan. It was designated a Michigan State Historic Site in 1987 and listed on the National Register of Historic Places in 1989.

== History ==
The parish of St. Vincent DePaul was established in 1851, covering all of Oakland County and parts of the surrounding counties. The first church used by the parish was located on North Saginaw Street in Pontiac. In 1866, the church moved to a location on Oakland Avenue at Lafayette. The church continued to grow, and in the 1880s, the Reverend Fridolin Baumgartner began raising funds for the construction of the present church. The congregation hired the Detroit architecture firm of Donaldson & Meier to design the church, and the cornerstone was laid on September 6, 1885.

The church was dedicated two years later, on September 18, 1887. A 6600-pound bell was installed in the church in 1890. A rectory was constructed in 1895, a school building was added in 1897, and a parish hall in 1911. The school was replaced with another structure in 1923, and a convent was added in 1926. The school operated until 1969, when it closed.

In 1999, the diocese merged the St. Vincent de Paul parish with two other local parishes (St. Joseph and St. Michael the Archangel) to form the St Damien of Molokai parish, following the beatification of Father Damien in 1995. The Belgian-born priest was known for his work for 16 years with Hawaiians with leprosy at a colony on Molokai. Father Damien was canonized as a Catholic saint in 2009, the tenth person recognized by the church in the United States. The St. Vincent de Paul church continues to serve the parish.

== Description ==
The St. Vincent DePaul Catholic Church complex contains St. Vincent's Church (1885), rectory (1895), parish hall (1911), St. Frederick School (1923), and the Convent (1926). The buildings are all located very close to each other, and are all constructed of brick with stone detailing. All buildings were designed by Detroit architects Donaldson & Meier. With similar styles and materials, the buildings of the complex blend together in a pleasing architectural group. Of the five buildings in the complex. only three - the church, the school, and the convent - were listed on the National Register. The other two buildings - the rectory and parish hall - have been altered substantially, and no longer resemble their original form.

The church is a brick Gothic Revival structure in a crucifix form, with an apse at one end and a tower with tall steeple on the front facade. Three doorways on the front have double doors within pointed arch openings, and a window above each entrance. A large double window with pointed arch containing two vertical stained glass panels is above the entry. Other stained glass windows are throughout the church.

St. Frederick's School is a three-story dark red brick Collegiate Gothic structure of mildly Elizabethan design with a symmetrical facade having projecting ends and a projecting center entrance. The entrance is in a recessed, pointed archway surrounded by stone. Above the entryway is a small square window, above which is inscribed "St. Frederick's School." Above is a third-floor double-window opening topped by a triangular parapet. The remaining window openings are rectangular and contain four double hung, four-over-four-light units. The nearby convent is an austere Collegiate Gothic three-story building with minimal cut stone detail around the door and window openings.

== See also ==
- National Register of Historic Places listings in Oakland County, Michigan
