= First Unitarian Universalist Church of Detroit =

Church in Detroit, Michigan, U.S.

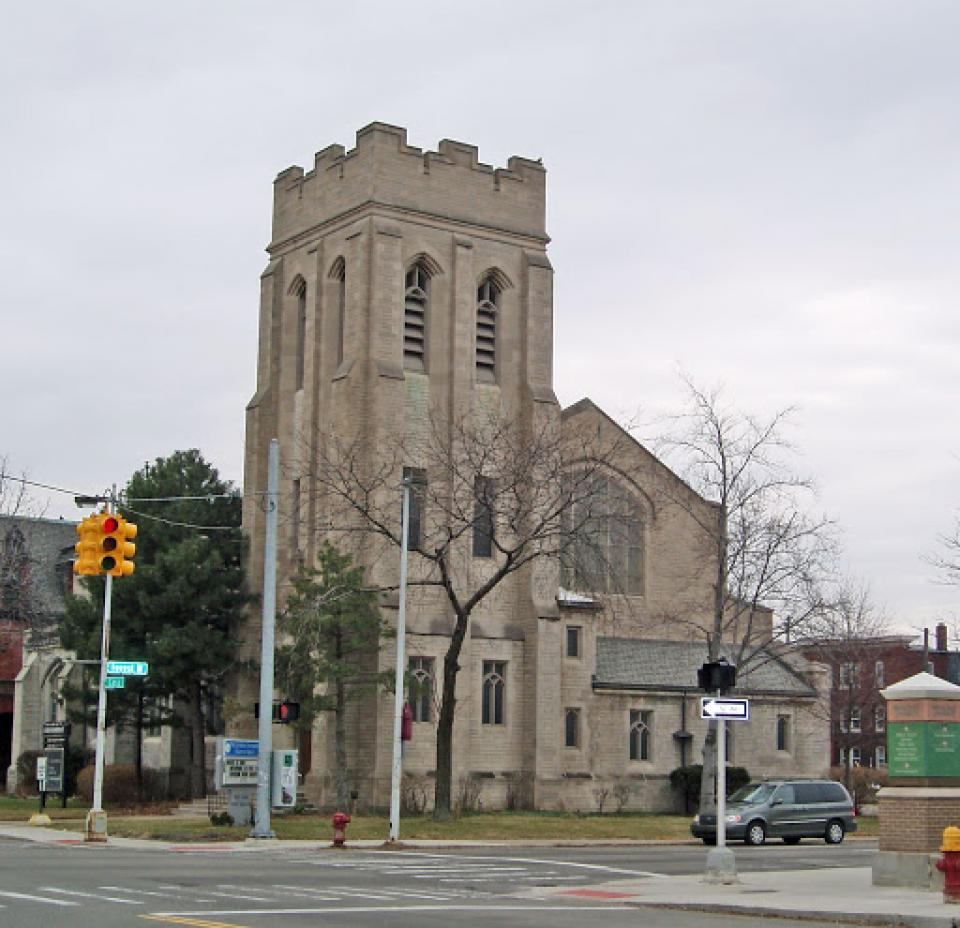

- Location in Michigan Location in United States
- 42°21′11.84″N 83°3′55.67″W
- Location: 4605 Cass Ave. Detroit, Michigan 48201

Architecture
- Architect: Donaldson and Meier
- Architectural type: Neo-Gothic
- Years built: 1916

The First Unitarian-Universalist Church of Detroit (also known as UU Detroit) is a historic church building at 4605 Cass Ave. in Detroit, Michigan. It was built in 1916 and is attached to the historic Perry McAdow House.

== History ==
The 1916 church building was designed by Donaldson and Meier in the Neo-Gothic style. It was constructed by the Universalist Church of Our Father as a replacement for an 1881 Romanesque-Revival church building on Grand Circus Park in the outskirts of downtown Detroit. The new church was built on a rose garden on the property of the Perry McAdow House which was purchased in 1913 by the Universalists.

In 1932, the First Unitarian Church of Detroit decided to move as the widening of Woodward Avenue necessitated cutting off the front of their building at Edmund Place. They moved in with the Universalists in 1932 and formerly merged in 1934, forming the First Unitarian-Universalist Church of Detroit.

In 2011, the church donated the complex of buildings, including the sanctuary and attached church house with social hall and second story church, to the East Michigan Environmental Action Council (EMEAC). The church is now part of the EMEAC managed Cass Corridor Commons, a multi-use non-profit and green space in which educational activities, community efforts and business endeavors are created and carried out.
