= Penobscot Building =

Skyscraper in Detroit

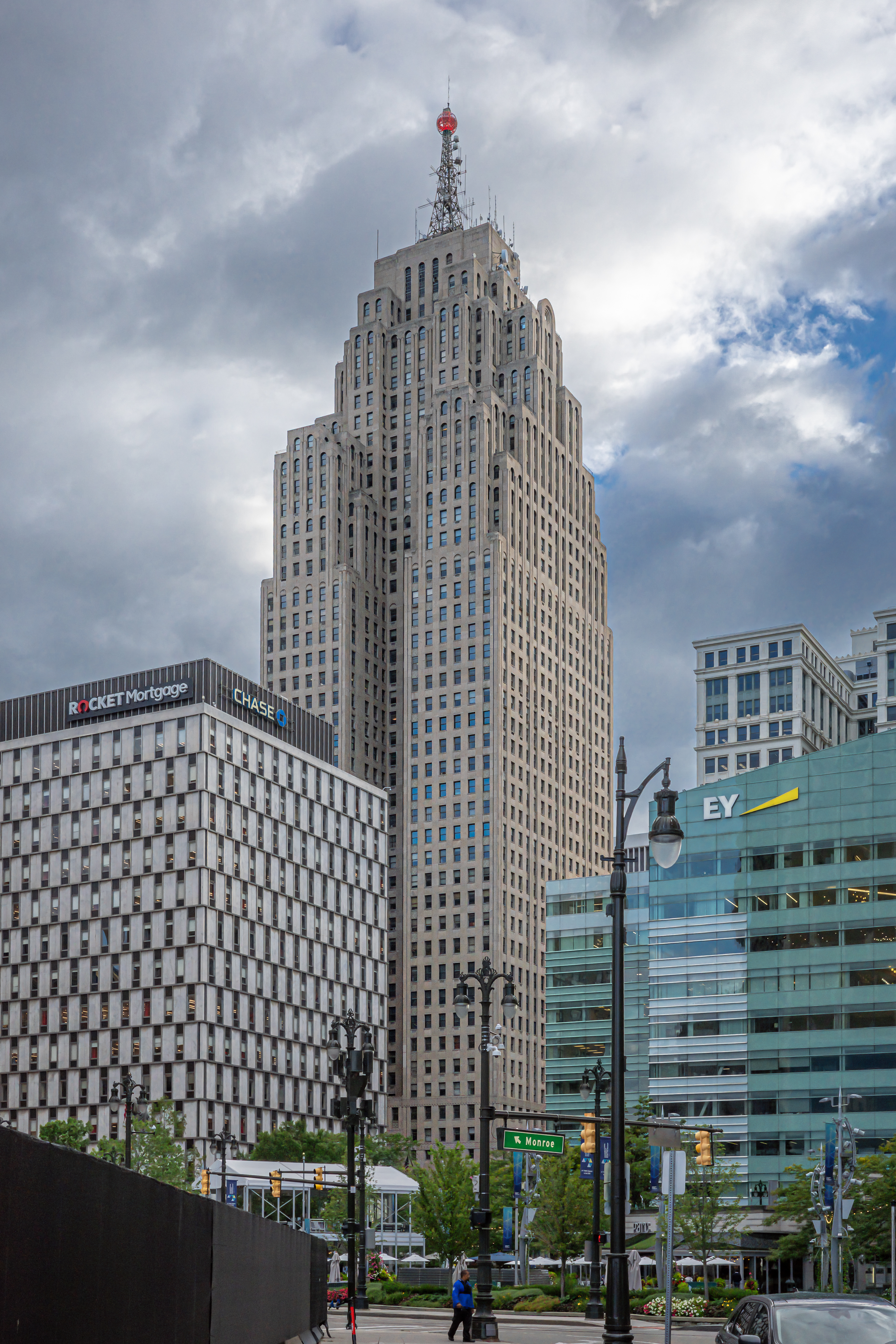
- Penobscot Building seen from Campus Martius Park in 2025
- Interactive map of the Penobscot Building area
- Alternative names: City National Bank Building; Penobscot Building - 47 Tower

General information
- Type: Commercial offices
- Location: 645 Griswold Street; Detroit, Michigan
- Coordinates: 42.33041°N 83.0475°W
- Construction started: 1927
- Completed: 1928
- Owner: Triple Group Of Companies
- Operator: Triple Properties Detroit

Height
- Antenna spire: 202.4 m (664 ft)
- Roof: 172.2 m (565 ft)
- Top floor: 159.4 m (523 ft)

Technical details
- Floor count: above ground: 47 below ground: 2
- Floor area: 1,258,900 sq ft (116,960 m^{2})
- Lifts/elevators: 25

Design and construction
- Architects: Wirt C. Rowland; Smith, Hinchman & Grylls; Donaldson and Meier
- Greater Penobscot Building
- U.S. Historic district – Contributing property
- Architectural style: Art Deco
- Part of: Detroit Financial District (ID09001067)
- Designated CP: December 14, 2009

The Greater Penobscot Building, commonly known as the Penobscot Building, (Note: The Greater Penobscot Building is often confused with the older, smaller, adjacent Penobscot Building.) is a 45-story office skyscraper in downtown Detroit, Michigan, United States. Constructed between 1927 and 1928, the Art Deco building is located in the heart of the Detroit Financial District. It is part of the Penobscot Block, which also contains the original Penobscot Building and the Penobscot Building Annex.

The Greater Penobscot Building stands 566 feet (173 m) tall, (Note: The framing elevation drawing of this building shows a height of 562.166 ft (171.348 m) to the highest roof, approximately 565.75 ft (172.44 m) to the parapet wall around the roof, and 654.166 ft (199.390 m) to the top of the warning beacon atop the antenna.) and was the tallest building in Detroit and in Michigan from its completion until 1977, when it was surpassed by the Renaissance Center. At the time of its completion, it was the eighth-tallest building in the world, the fourth-tallest in the United States, and the tallest in the United States outside of New York and Chicago.

== History ==
=== Name origin ===
The building is named for the Penobscot River in Maine. The building was named by Simon J. Murphy, President of the Simon J. Murphy Company. Murphy named the building from his association with lumbering in the Maine woods and on the Penobscot River in Maine. Motifs in art deco style ornamentation is used on the exterior and the interiors. The following version of the choice of the name of the building is found in an undated publication believed to have been published concurrent with the building's dedication in 1928:

An intimation of the Simon J. Murphy Sr. family's early history, together with the expression of genuine sentiment regarding the beginnings of the Murphy fortune, is contained in the name of the Greater Penobscot Building...... Long before the Civil War days, Simon J. Murphy and his partner, then two lads who had grown up in the Maine woods obtained their first employment in one of the logging camps along the Penobscot River - a stream named for the powerful tribe of Penobscot Indians.

=== Events ===
On holidays, both the Penobscot Building and the nearby One Woodward Avenue light-up for the night, with red, white and blue for Independence Day and Canada Day; and red, white and green for the Christmas season. In addition, during the Christmas season, the Penobscot Building's radio broadcast tower is illuminated bright gold, to resemble a giant glowing Christmas tree topped with a flashing red beacon. The Penobscot Building has become a souvenir item along with other Detroit skyscrapers.

The first televisions in Michigan were sold in the retail space on the Griswold level of this building.

For a period of time in the late 1970s and early 1980s, it was renamed the City National Bank Building, after its major tenant. When City National was acquired by another bank and renamed, the historic Penobscot name was revived.

=== Ownership ===
In May 2012, the Penobscot Building was sold for $5 million to the Toronto-based real estate company, Triple Properties Detroit. The building has since incurred numerous fines and code violations from the city of Detroit.

== Architecture ==
The architect Wirt C. Rowland, of the prominent Smith Hinchman & Grylls firm based in Detroit, designed the Penobscot in an elaborate Art Deco style in 1928. Clad in Indiana Limestone with a granite base, it rises like a sheer cliff for thirty stories, then has a series of setbacks culminating in a red neon beacon tower. Like many of the city's other Roaring Twenties buildings, it displays Art Deco influences, including its "H" shape (designed to allow maximum sunlight into the building) and the sculptural setbacks that cause the upper floors to progressively "erode".

The opulent Penobscot is one of many buildings in Detroit that features architectural sculpture by Corrado Parducci. The ornamentation includes American Indian motifs, particularly in the entrance archway and in metalwork found in the lobby. At night, the building's upper floors are lit in floodlight fashion, topped with a red sphere.

The building's architect, Wirt C. Rowland, also designed other Detroit skyscrapers, such as the Guardian Building and the Buhl Building, in the same decade.

=== Penobscot Block ===
The tower is also connected to two older and smaller buildings, the 1905 Penobscot Building and the Penobscot Building Annex (1916). Together, the buildings comprise the Penobscot Block, located at Griswold Street and West Fort Street. The Greater Penobscot was the last portion of the complex to be developed.

=== Landmark ===
The Penobscot Building is a contributing property in the Detroit Financial Historic District, and on the National Register of Historic Places.

== Tenants ==
- The Caucus Club, a restaurant known for hosting influential business officials, was located in Penobscot from 1952 until 2012. On October 4, 2012, the restaurant announced that it would close by the end of that month. Early in her career, Barbra Streisand appeared as one of the lounge singers at the Caucus Club in 1961. Caucus Club reopened under new ownership in 2017, after an extensive renovation.
- The tower apex once had "CNB" signs for a local bank that was formerly headquartered in the Penobscot Building.
- For approximately 20 years ending in 2009, the building was home to radio station WJLB and its well-known 80s DJ, The Electrifying Mojo, who broadcast his nightly visits over Detroit from his 'Mothership'. The Electrifying Mojo is credited with exposing many Detroit techno musicians to new audiences through his broadcasts.
- The Smart Detroit Conference Center occupies space on the 13th floor, and includes Class A conference, meeting, or convention space.
- The Wayne County Friend of the Court occupies floors between the sub-basement and eighth floor, making it the current largest tenant of the building.

== Gallery ==
Architectural details by Corrado Parducci
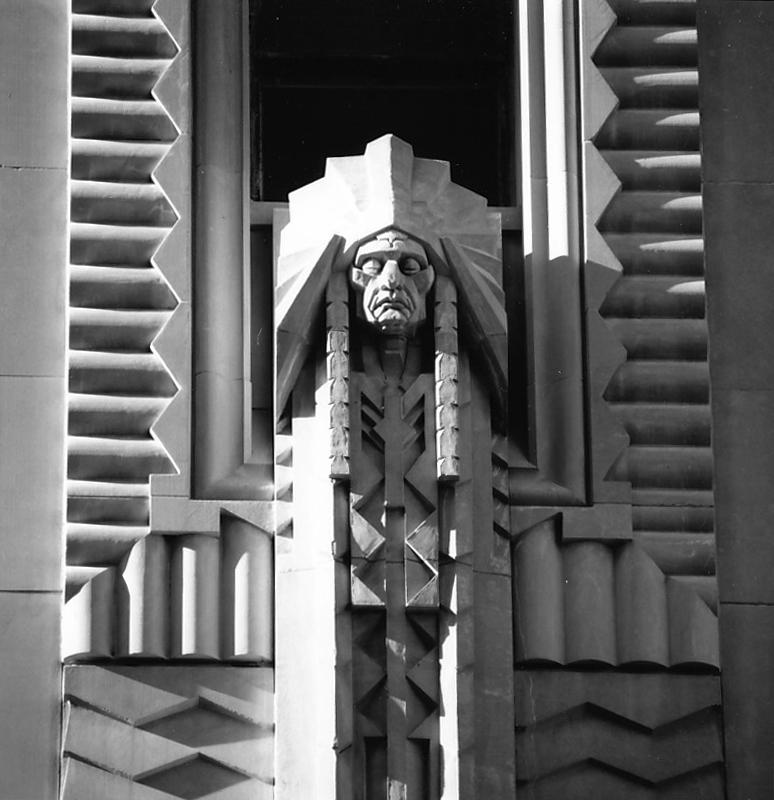

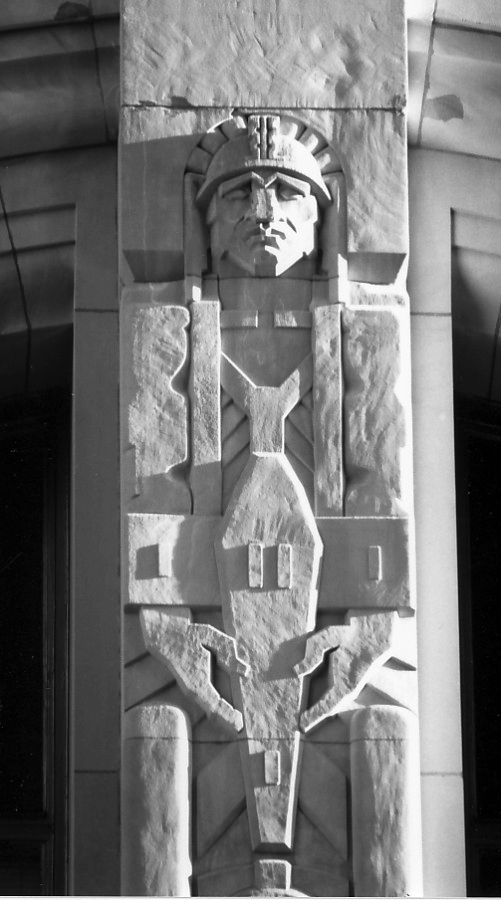

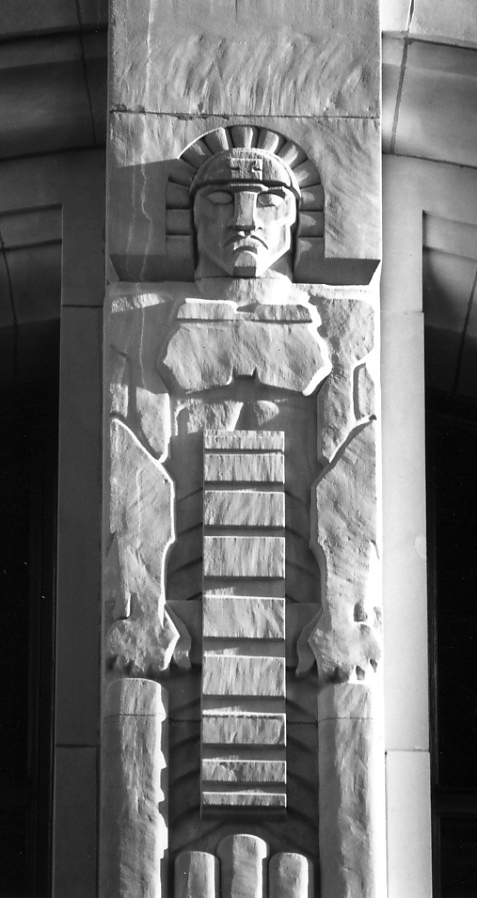

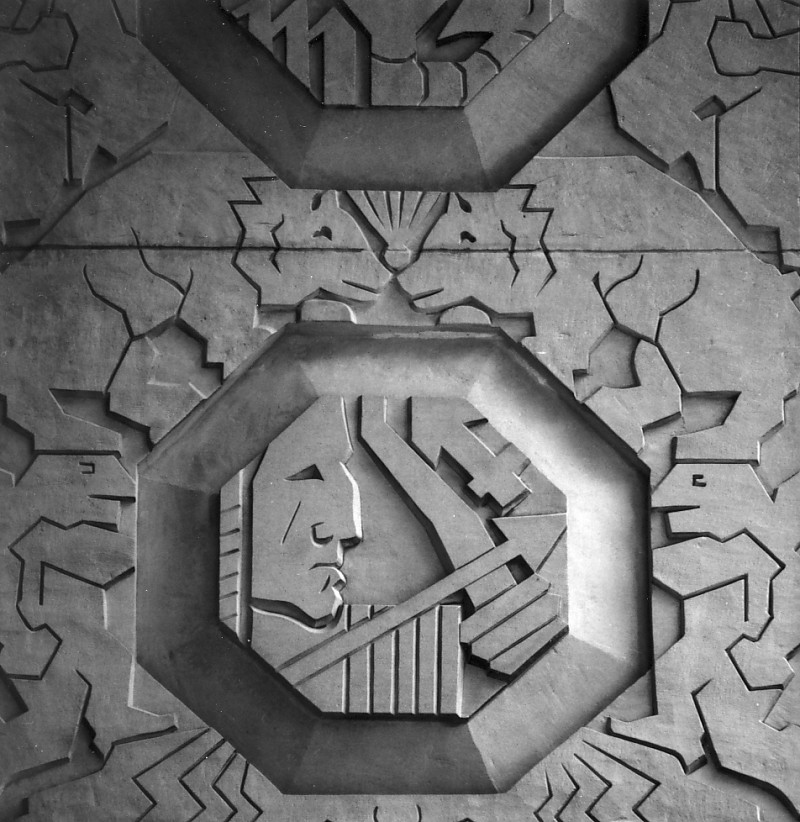

== See also ==
- Penobscot Block — the complex

- The Penobscot Building — the oldest
- Penobscot Building Annex — access connected

- Buhl Building
- Detroit Financial District
- Guardian Building
- List of tallest buildings in Detroit
- National Register of Historic Places listings in Detroit, Michigan
