= Unitarian Universalist Church (Ann Arbor, Michigan) =

Historic church in Michigan, United States

- U.S. National Register of Historic Places
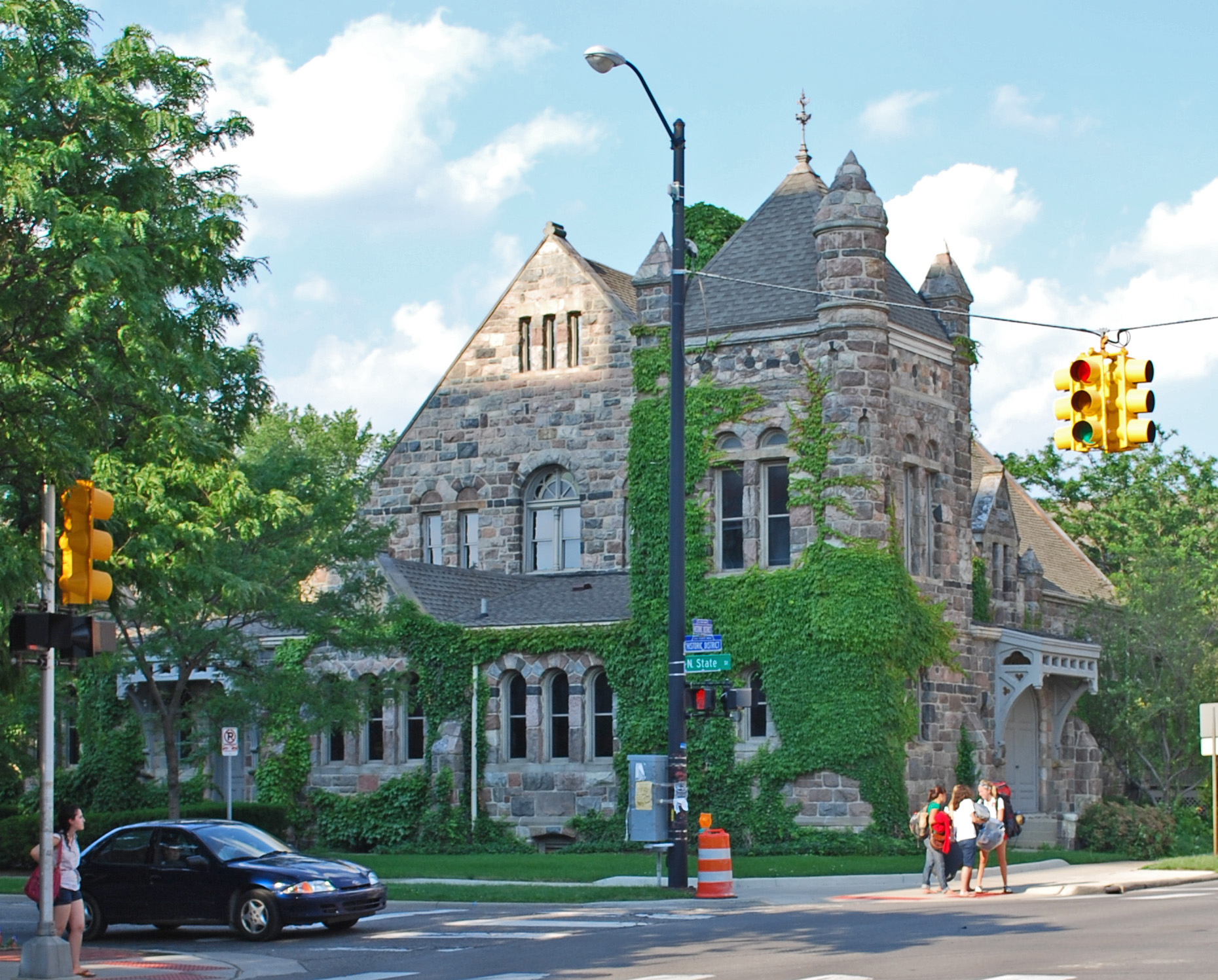

- Location within Michigan Location within the United States
- Interactive map
- Location: 100 N. State Street; Ann Arbor, Michigan
- Coordinates: 42°16′53″N 83°44′26″W
- Area: less than one acre
- Built: 1881–82
- Built by: Walker Bros.
- Architect: Donaldson and Meier
- Architectural style: Richardsonian Romanesque
- NRHP reference No.: 78001513
- Added to NRHP: October 4, 1978

The Unitarian Universalist Church (also known as Grace Bible Church or First Unitarian Church) is a historic church building at 100 N. State Street in Ann Arbor, Michigan. It was listed on the National Register of Historic Places in 1978.

== History ==
The First Unitarian Society of Ann Arbor was formed in 1865, and began worshiping in what was once the Methodist Church. In 1878, Dr. Jabez T. Sunderland arrived in Ann Arbor as the pastor of the First Unitarian Church. One of the first projects he tackled in his 20-year tenure was the construction of a new church building. Sunderland raised $19,000 toward the cost of the structure, and the congregation hired the Detroit architectural firm of Donaldson and Meier to design the building. Construction on the building began in 1881, with the stonework done by the Walker Brothers firm of Ann Arbor, and it was completed in 1882.

A student center addition was constructed in 1920. The Unitarian congregation used the building until 1946, when the congregation moved to Washtenaw Avenue. The Grace Bible Church congregation purchased the building that year and eventually leased the building to the Bible Church of True Holiness in 1971. Grace Bible Church moved to South Maple Road in 1975. The building was sold again in 1985 to D. B. Associates Ltd. which renovated the inside and outside of the then deteriorating building to house the architecture firm of Hobbs and Black, Associates, Inc. During renovation, an 1890s Tiffany window that had been covered over in the 1930s was discovered.

== Description ==
The Ann Arbor First Unitarian Church is a two-story rectangular Richardsonian Romanesque structure constructed of ashlar decorated with bands of darker stone. The roof is cross-gabled, and a turreted square tower with a hip roof sits at the rear of the building.
