= Donaldson and Meier =

American architectural firm

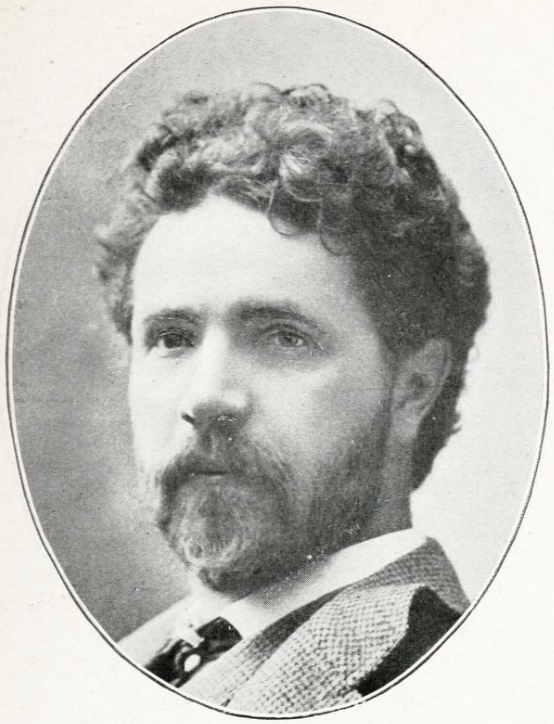
John M Donaldson, c. 1904

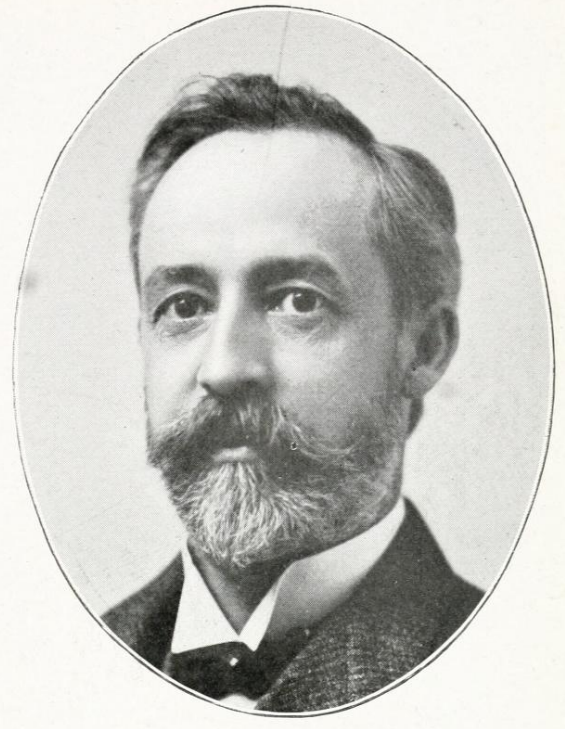
Henry Meier, c. 1904

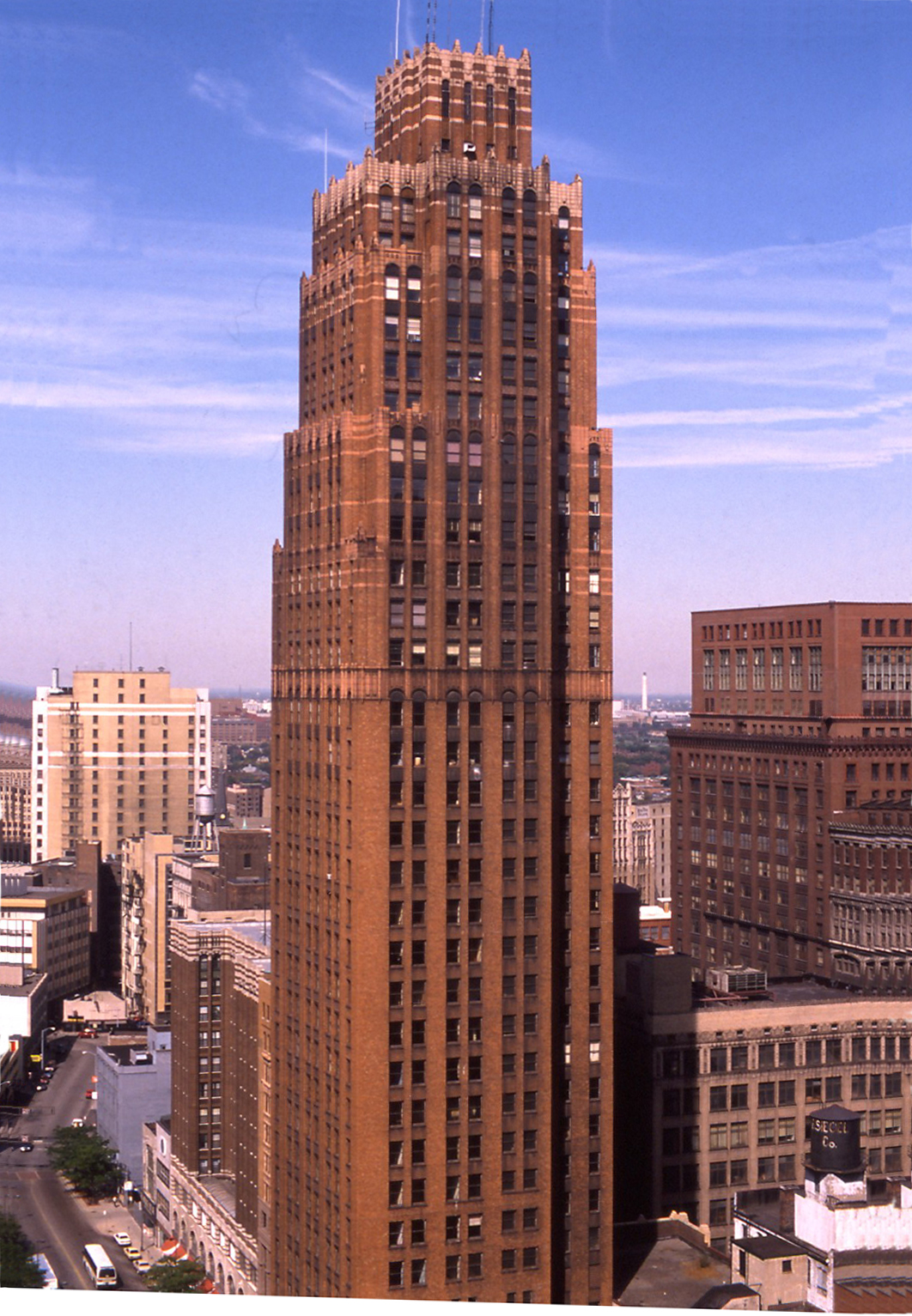
David Stott Building

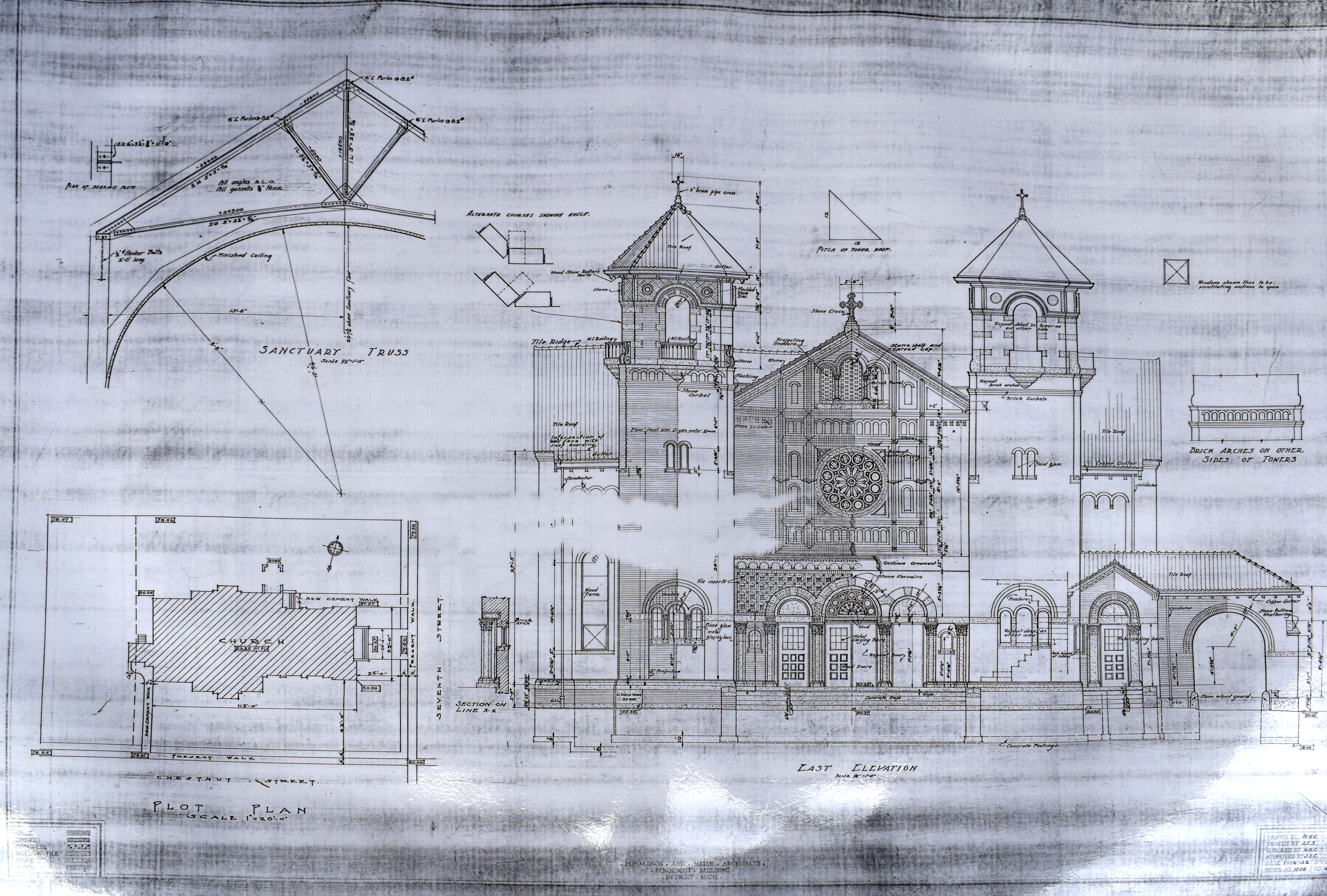
Donaldson and Meier plans for St. Joseph Church (Port Huron, Michigan)

Donaldson and Meier was an architectural firm based in Detroit, Michigan. Founded in 1880 by John M. Donaldson (1854–1941) and Henry J. Meier (1858–1917), the firm produced a large and varied number of commissions in Detroit and southeastern Michigan. Donaldson, the principal designer of the partnership from a design point of view, was born in Stirling, Scotland and immigrated to Detroit at a young age. He returned to Europe where he studied at the Art Academy in Munich, Germany, and at the École des Beaux-Arts in Paris, France.

The early designs from the firm, such as the Unitarian Universalist Church in Ann Arbor, were frequently in the Richardsonian Romanesque style but, as with many other architectural companies whose longevity outlast the style of the day, their output changed with the times. Their last buildings, such as the David Stott Building, were in the Art Deco genre.

Like most of the prominent architects in Detroit during the 1920s and 1930s, Donaldson and Meier employed sculptor Lee Lawrie to produce a panel for Beaumont Tower and hired Corrado Parducci to create sculpture for many of their other buildings.

== Selected commissions ==
All buildings are located in Detroit, unless otherwise indicated.

- (1880) William H. Strong Residence 69 Edmund Place. Demolished in 2004.
- (1880) James F. Buffum Residence, 74 Edmund Place. Demolished in 2000
- (1882) First Unitarian Church 100 N. State Street, Ann Arbor, MI.
- (1883) Ransom Gillis Carriage House 2820 John R. Demolished in 1930s.
- (1883) Sullivan M. Cutcheon Residence 103 Edmund Place. Demolished in 1983.
- (1883) Alpha Delta Phi Fraternity House 556 South State Street, Ann Arbor, MI. Demolished in 1910.
- (1883) Campbell Symington Residence 3977 Second Avenue.
- (1885) Saint Vincent de Paul Roman Catholic Church 46408 Woodward Avenue, Pontiac, MI.
- (1886) Harry Barnard Residence 3127 Park Avenue.
- (1887) Belle Isle Casino Demolished in 1908.
- (1887) Residence 78 Peterboro Demolished in 1980s
- (1888) Bagley Building 112 East Congress. Demolished in 1957.
- (1888) Engine #15 Detroit Fire Department 759 Hubbard. Demolished in 1960s.
- (1888) Belle Island Boat House Demolished.
- (1888) Duplex at 447/451 Alfred Demolished in 2001.
- (1889) Michigan Yacht Club Destroyed by fire in 1904.
- (1890) Ernest Krapp Residence, 2174 East Congress, Demolished in 1965.
- (1890) Detroit Fire Department Headquarters 250 West Larned. Demolished in 1928.
- (1890) First Unitarian Church 2870 Woodward Avenue. Destroyed by fire in 2014.
- (1890) Residence at 453 West Forest .
- (1891) First Detroit Boat Club Destroyed by fire in 1893.
- (1891) Residence at 437 West Forest .
- (1892) Saint Elizabeth Roman Catholic Church 3138 East Canfield.
- (1892) Saint Leo Catholic high school, 4860 15th Street. Operated 1892-1971.
- (1892) Saint John the Baptist Roman Catholic Church Monroe, MI.
- (1893) Hotel Sainte Claire 305 Monroe, Demolished in 1934.
- (1893) Engine #17 Detroit Fire Department 6201 Cass Avenue, Demolished in 1922.
- (1893) Frank C. Hecker Residence 255 East Ferry.
- (1893) William C. Croul Residence 263 East Ferry Avenue.
- (1893) J. Henry Ling Residence 453 Chandler.
- (1894) Edson, Moore & Company Building 110 East Jefferson Avenue. Demolished in 1950s.
- (1894) Second Detroit Boat Club Destroyed by fire in 1901.
- (1894) Mulford T. Hunter Residence 77 West Hancock.
- (1895) Acme White Lead & Color Works 8250 Saint Aubin, Demolished.
- (1895) John M. Donaldson Duplex Residence 434-438 Alfred street, Demolished in 2004.
- (1896) Union Trust Building 600 Griswold, Demolished in 1957.
- (1896) L. N. Valpey & Company Building 1413-1415-1421 Woodward Avenue.
- (1896) Richman Brothers Company Building 1505 Woodward Avenue, Demolished in 1930.
- (1896) Miner Building 138 Cadillac Square.
- (1897) Woodmere Cemetery Superintendent's Office 9400 West Fort Street.
- (1897) Gari and Julius Melchers Residence 723 Seyburn.
- (1897) Sydney Forbes Residence 707 Van Dyke.
- (1898) Pedestal for the Statue of Austin Blair at the Michigan State Capitol, Lansing, Michigan.
- (1898) Commercial Building at 328 Woodward Avenue Demolished in 1950s.
- (1898) Jefferson Avenue Postoffice Sub Station C 6470 East Jefferson Avenue.
- (1898) Waterworks Park Chauncey Hurlbut Branch Library Demolished.
- (1898) Terrace at 6388-6436 John R .
- (1898) Charles Erdman Residence 258 Erskine.
- (1898) Residence at 1033 Field Demolished.
- (1899) Commercial Block at 2320 Gratiot Avenue .
- (1899) Engine #23 Detroit Fire Department 1818 East Grand Boulevard.
- (1899) Martin A. Edwards Residence 305 Eliot.
- (1900) Saint Bernard of Clairvaux Roman Catholic Church 11031 Mack Avenue.
- (1901) Saint Anthony Parish Rectory, 5247 Sheridan.
- (1902) Saint Anthony Roman Catholic Church 5247 Sheridan.
- (1902) Washington Arcade Building, 1545 Woodward Avenue.
- (1902) Murphy Building, 151-155 West Congress.
- (1902) Stevens Building, 1258 Washington Boulevard.
- (1902) Parke, Davis & Company Building #55, 1000 River Place Drive.
- (1902) Engine #27 Detroit Fire Department, 1467 Junction.
- (1902) Donald Fuller Residence, 160 Pallister, Demolished.
- (1904) Fisk Rubber Company Building, 262 East Jefferson Avenue, Demolished in 1950s.
- (1904) Y.W.C.A. Downtown Branch, 1455 Washington Boulevard, Demolished in 1925.
- (1905) Penobscot Building, 131 West Fort Street.
- (1906) Home Savings Bank Branch, 6301 Gratiot Avenue.
- (1907) Saint Andrews Society Hall, 431 East Congress.
- (1907) Woodmere Cemetery Waiting Room, 9400 West Fort Street.
- (1908) Dental School Building, 1011 North University Avenue, Ann Arbor, MI. Demolished in 1970.
- (1908) William G. Smith Residence, 1109 Iroquois.
- (1908) James S. Heaton Residence, 228 Eliot.
- (1909) Newcomb, Endicott & Company Building Addition, Demolished in 1926.
- (1909) Y.M.C.A. Downtown Branch, 2020 Witherell, Demolished in 1998.
- (1910) Alumni Memorial Hall, 525 South State Street, Ann Arbor, MI.
- (1910) Residence at 655 Lawrence.
- (1911) Fowler Building, 1225 Woodward Avenue.
- (1911) Woodmere Cemetery Chapel, 9400 West Fort Street.
- (1911) John W. Beaumont Residence, 1090 Seminole.
- (1911) Austin Church Residence, 165 George Street, Trenton, MI. Demolished in 2013.
- (1912) Church of the Annunciation Roman Catholic, 1265 Parkview.
- (1912) Augustus C. Stellwagen Residence, 271 Arden Park Boulevard.
- (1913) Detroit Board of Commerce Building, was transformed in Cass Theatre in 1927. Demolished in 1977.
- (1913) Peoples State Bank Branch, 1473 Gratiot Avenue, Demolished.
- (1913) Peoples State Bank Branch, 6499 Chene, Demolished in 1980s.
- (1913) Arcadia Dance Hall, 3527 Woodward Avenue, Demolished in 1972.
- (1914) Peninsular State Bank Branch, 7856 Gratiot Avenue, Demolished.
- (1914) George Osius Branch Detroit Public Library, 8530 Gratiot Avenue, Demolished in 1930s.
- (1914) Waiting Room/Offices Mount Olivet Cemetery, 17100 Van Dyke.
- (1914) Annunciation Parish Rectory, 1265 Parkview.
- (1914) John Donaldson Residence, 251 Arden Park Boulevard.
- (1914) Charles A. Strelinger Company Building, 165 East Larned, Demolished in 1957.
- (1915) State Savings Bank addition, 151 West Fort Street.
- (1915) Wayne County and Home Savings Bank, 44 Michigan Avenue, Extensively remuddled in 1961.
- (1915) Dime Savings Bank Branch, 1400 Michigan Avenue.
- (1915) Detroit College of Medicine Addition, 645 Mullett.
- (1915) J. Farrand Williams Residence, 2405 Burns.
- (1915) W. Grierson Smith Residence, 2188 Seminole.
- (1915) George H. Clippert Residence, 743 Virginia Park.
- (1915) John W. Grose Residence, 1941 Longfellow.
- (1916) Penobscot Annex, 140-150 West Congress.
- (1916) The Ingleside Club, 35 Atkinson, Demolished in 2018.
- (1916) First Unitarian-Universalist Church, 4605 Cass Avenue.
- (1916) Blessed Virgin Mary parish rectory, 13770 Gratiot.
- (1917) Glen & Anholtt Tools Works, 261 St. Aubin.
- (1917) Peninsular State Bank Branch, 8855 Woodward Avenue.
- (1917) Peninsular State Bank Branch, 11341 Woodward Avenue.
- (1917) McCollester Hall, 424 Prentis.
- (1917) Saint Benedict Roman Catholic Church, 45 Candler, Highland Park, MI.
- (1918) Academy of the Sacred Heart, 1600 Lawrence, Demolished in 1998.
- (1919) Peoples State Bank Branch, 7870 West Jefferson.
- (1919) Saint Benedict Parish School, 53 Candler, Highland Park, MI.
- (1920) People's State Bank Branch, 13340 Kercheval.
- (1920) People's State Bank Branch, 9956 East Forest.
- (1920) People's State Bank Branch, 7448 Harper Avenue.
- (1920) Peninsular State Bank Branch, 2484 Grand River Avenue, Demolished in 1970s.
- (1920) First National Bank of Birmingham, 188 North Old Woodward Avenue, Birmingham, MI.
- (1920) Central Fire Alarm Station, 697 Macomb, Demolished in 1970s.
- (1920) Engine #25-Detroit Fire Department, foot of McDougall, Demolished.
- (1920) Saint David Parish School and Convent, 8105 East Outer Drive.
- (1920) Saint Ambrose Parish School, 14938 Hampton Avenue, Grosse Pointe Park, MI. Demolished.
- (1921) Henry R. Schoolcraft Branch, 2200 East Davison, Demolished.
- (1921) Visitation Parish School, 1945 Webb, Demolished.
- (1921) Holy Name Parish School, 8084 Doyle.
- (1921) Saint Stanislaus Parish School, 2260 Medbury.
- (1921) Saint Catherine Parish Convent, 4151 Seminole.
- (1923) Holy Redeemer Roman Catholic Church, 1721 Junction.
- (1923) Saint Margaret Mary Parish School, 5045 Lemay.
- (1923) Most Holy Redeemer Monastery, 1867 Junction.
- (1924) Archdiocese of Detroit Chancery Building, 1234 Washington Boulevard.
- (1924) Wayne County & Home Savings Bank Branch, 12000 Grand River Avenue.
- (1924) Saint Catherine of Siena High School, 4214 Maxwell.
- (1924) Saint Hyacinth Roman Catholic Church, 3151 Farnsworth.
- (1924) Saint Bernard Parish School, 3840 Fairview.
- (1924) Saint Leo High School, 4950 14th Street.
- (1924) Residence at 354 Fiske.
- (1924) Residence at 400 Fiske.
- (1924) Residence at 445 Fiske.
- (1925) Detroit United Railway Passenger Terminal, 10640 Gratiot Avenue, Demolished in 2019.
- (1925) Wayne County and Home Savings Bank Branch, 4138 West Vernor.
- (1925) Bird House, 8450 West Ten Mile.
- (1925) Sacred Heart Seminary, 2701 West Chicago Boulevard.
- (1925) Saint Catherine of Siena Parish Rectory, 4151 Seminole.
- (1925) Residence at 17615 Hamilton Drive.
- (1925) Residence at 325 Fiske.
- (1925) Residence at 475 Fiske.
- (1925) Residence at 535 Fiske.
- (1926) Chapel of St. Therese, 46 Parsons.
- (1927) Elizabeth Cleveland Intermediate School, 13322 Conant.
- (1927) Saint Ambrose Roman Catholic Church, 15020 Hampton Street, Grosse Pointe Park, MI.
- (1927) Thomas Cooley High School, 15055 Hubbell.
- (1928) Beaumont Tower Michigan State University, East Lansing, MI.
- (1929) David Stott Building, 1150 Griswold.
- (1929) Saint Benedict Roman Catholic Church, 60 Church Street, Highland Park, MI.
- (1929) Victor L. Heftler Residence, 1051 Berkshire, Grosse Pointe Park, MI.
- (1930) Saint Catherine of Siena Roman Catholic Church, 4151 Seminole.
- (1931) Saint Margaret Mary Roman Catholic Church, 5095 Lemay.
- (1931) Saint Aloysius Roman Catholic Church, 1234 Washington Boulevard.
- (1949) Sacred Heart Roman Catholic Church, 311 Whitelam Street, Bad Axe, MI.
- (1951) Saint Florian Catholic Church, 3233 Grove Street Rd, Standish, MI.
- (1951) Saint Francis de Sales Roman Catholic Church, 10600 Fenkell.
- (1952) Saint James Roman Catholic Church, 241 Pearson, Ferndale,
- (1954) Holy Name of Jesus Roman Catholic Church, 13640 Van Dyke.
- (1954) Saint Rita Roman Catholic Church, 1000 East State Fair.
- (1955) Saint Matthew Roman Catholic Church, 6021 Whittier.
- (1955) Saint Louis the King Roman Catholic Church, 18891 Saint Louis.
- (1959) Saints Peter & Paul Roman Catholic Church, 7685 Grandville.
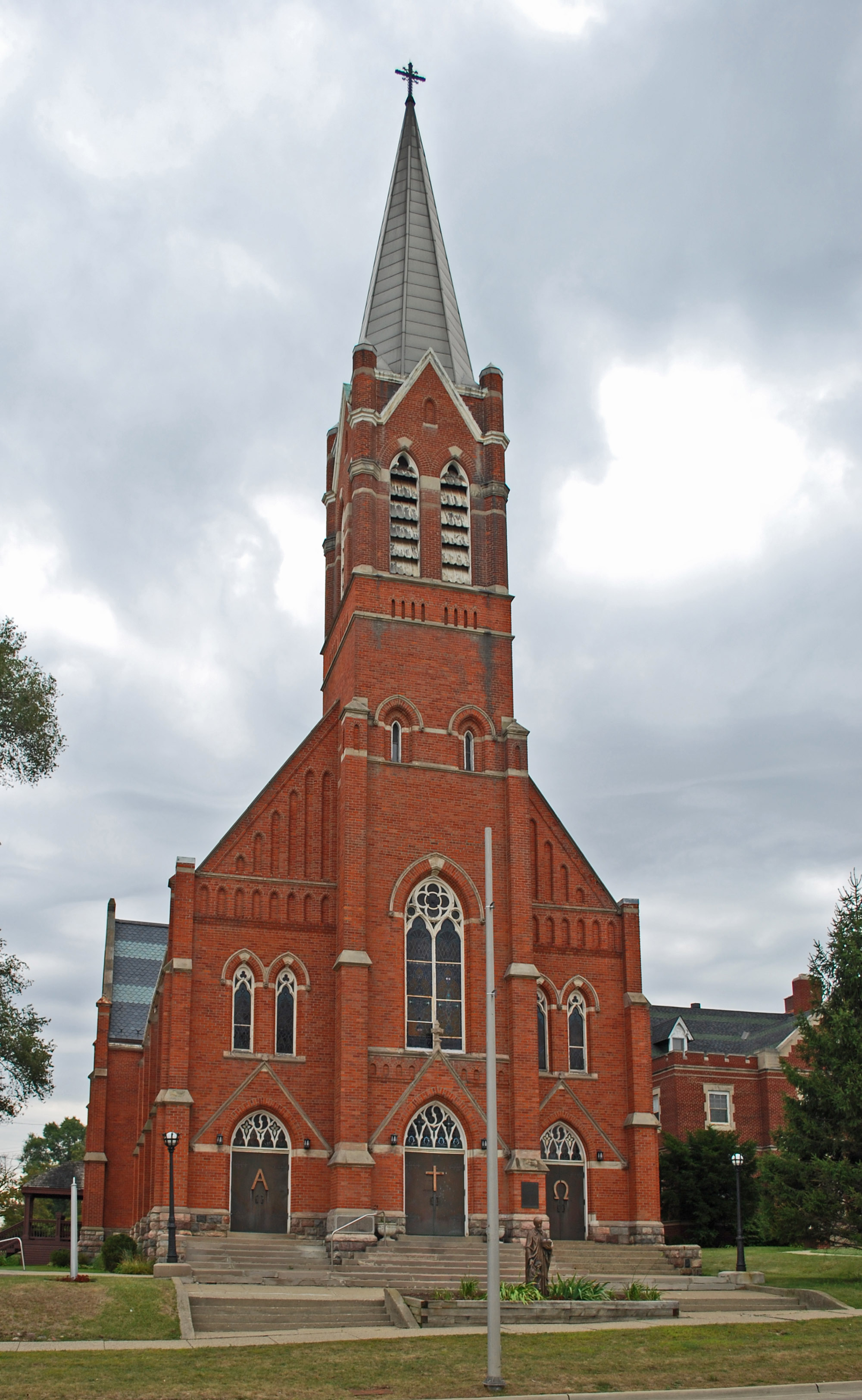
St. Vincent de Paul Church

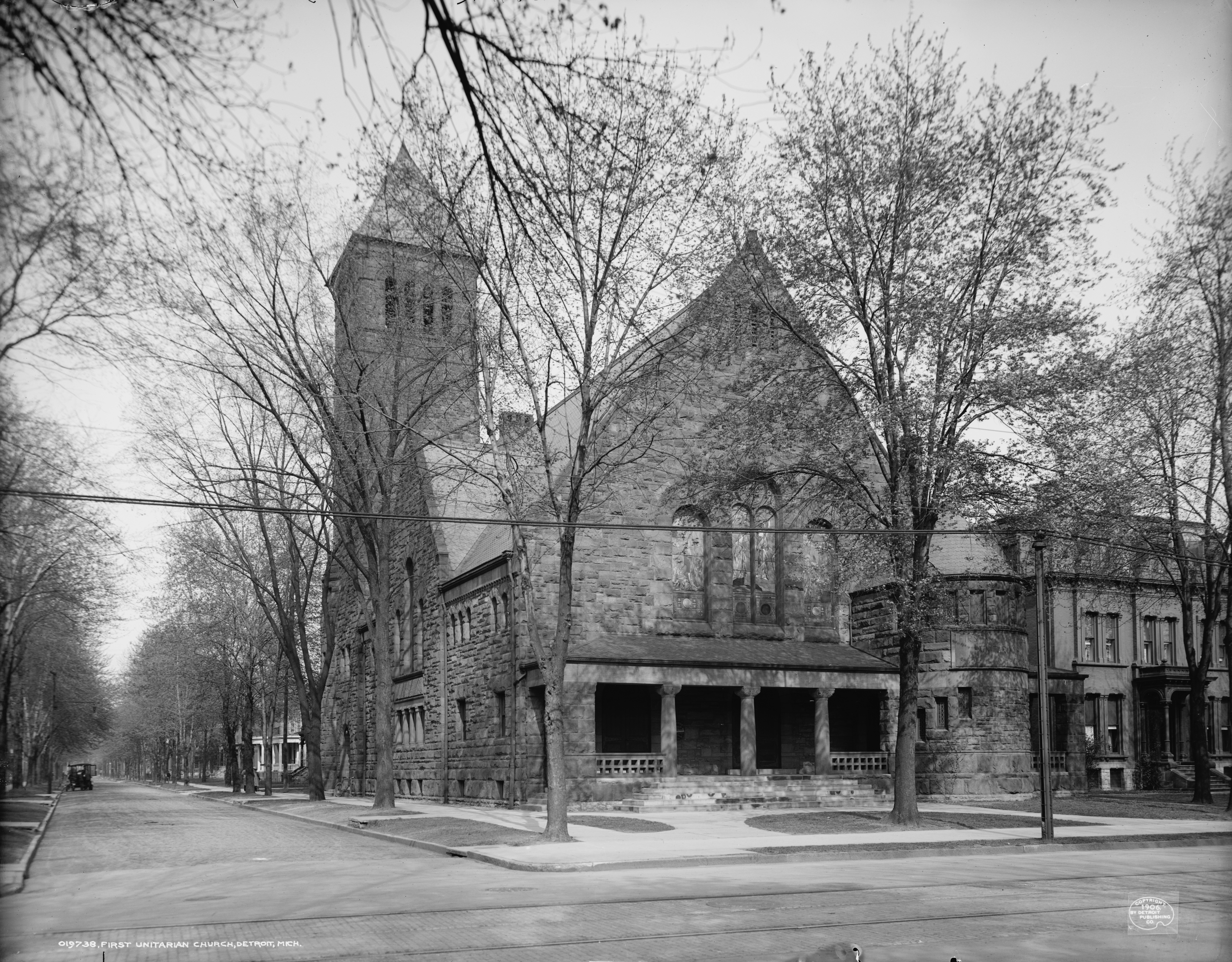
First Unitarian Church of Detroit, c. 1906

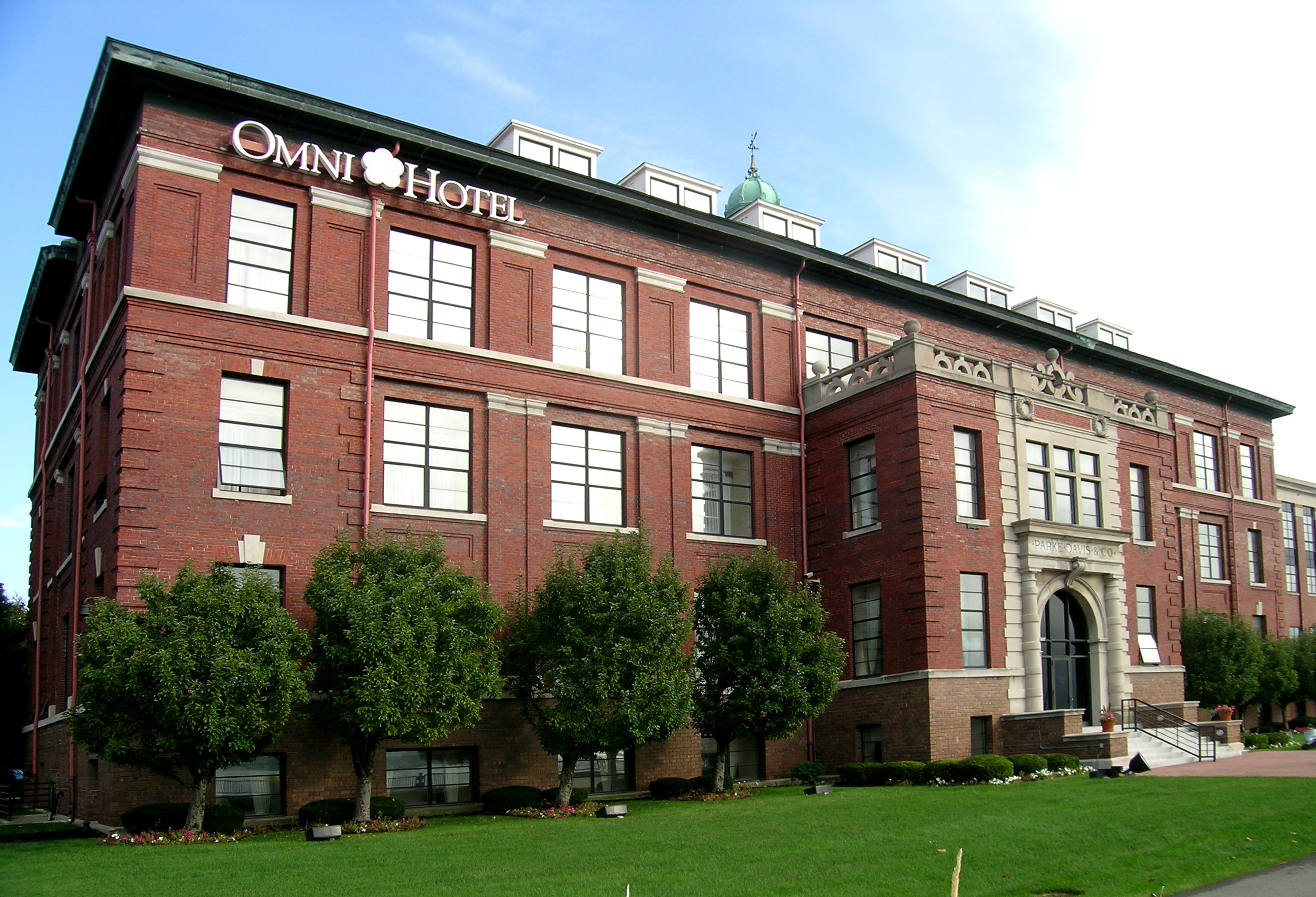
Parke-Davis Research Laboratory

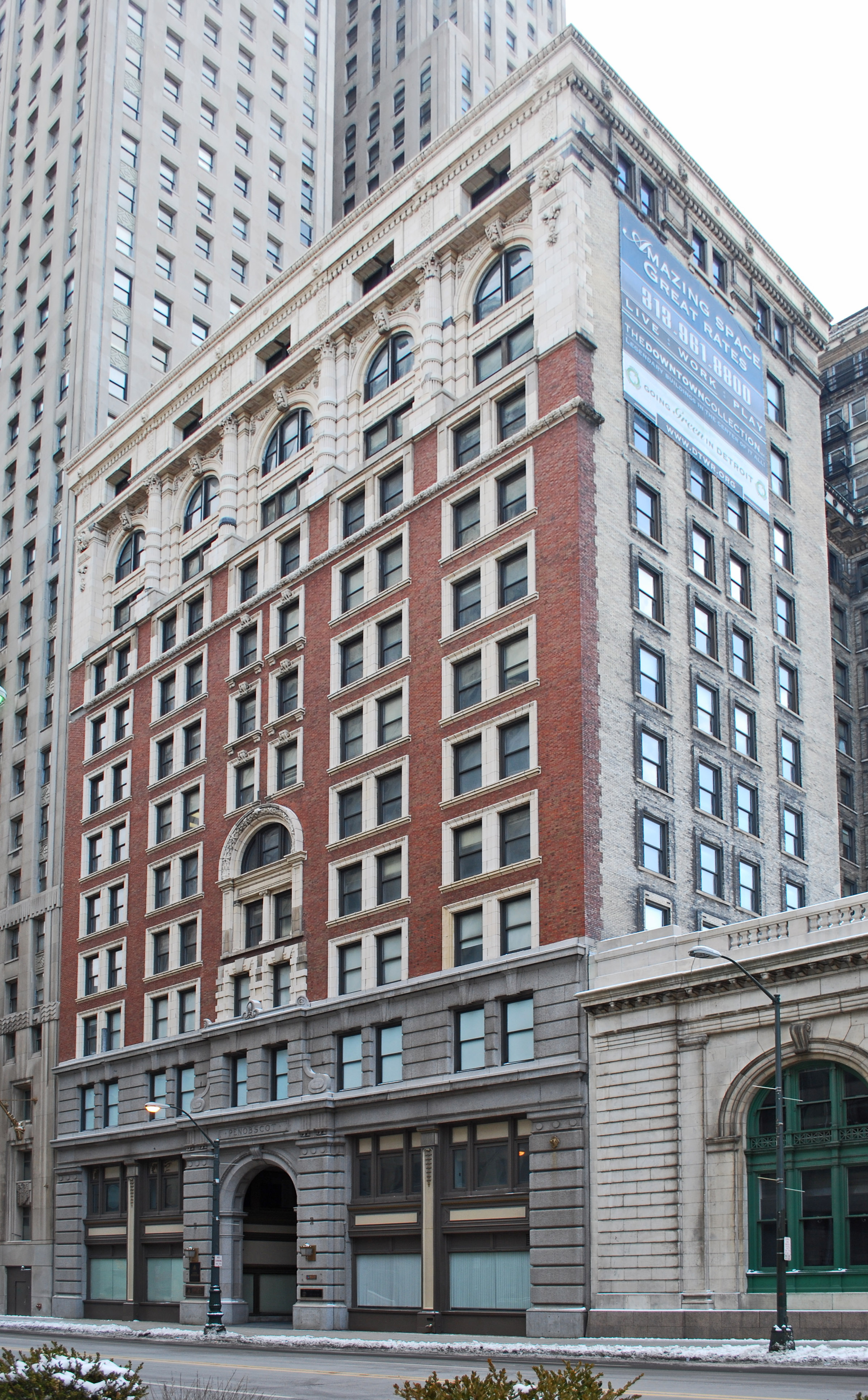
Penobscot Building

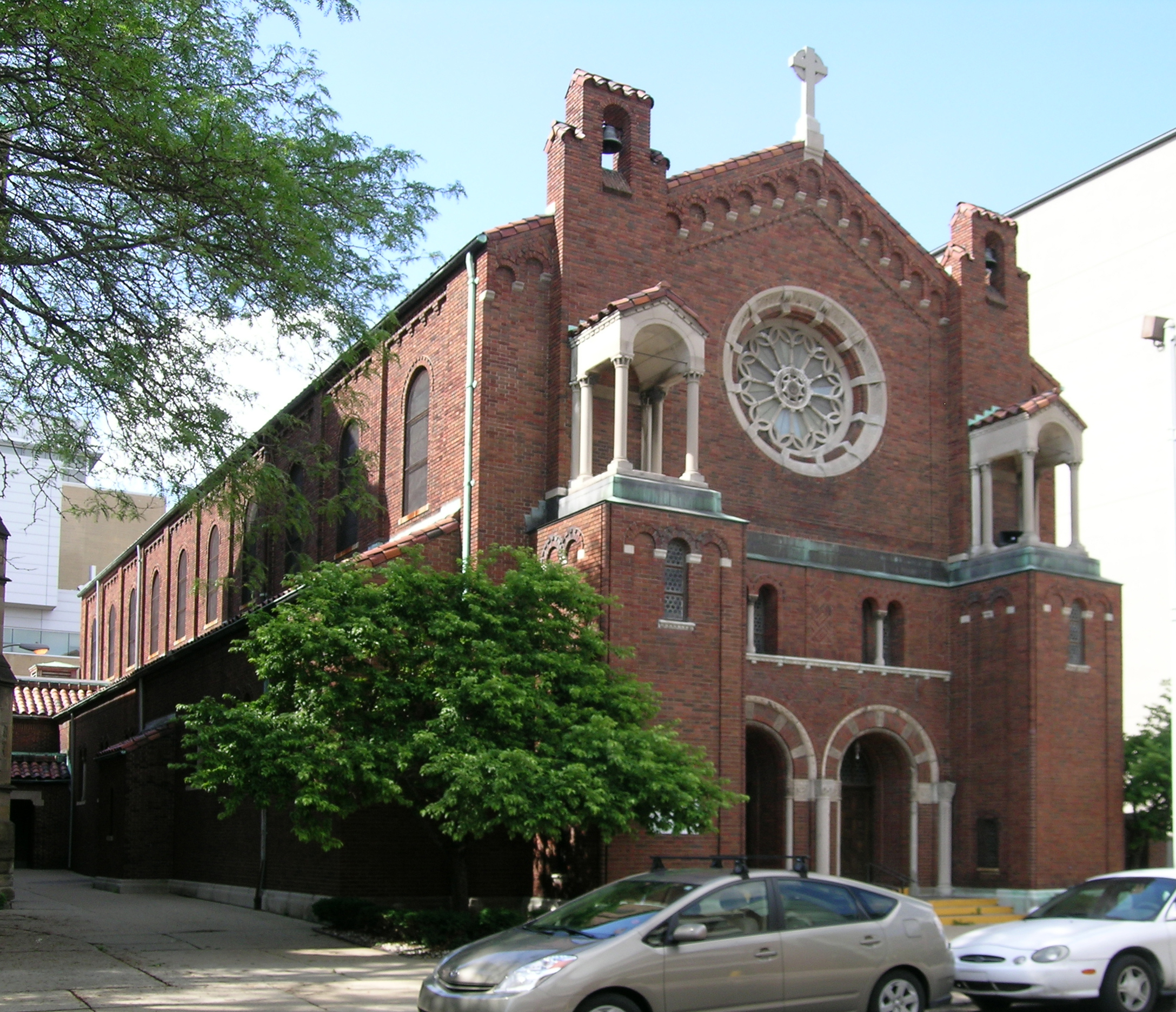
Chapel of St. Theresa-the Little Flower (now St. Patrick Church)

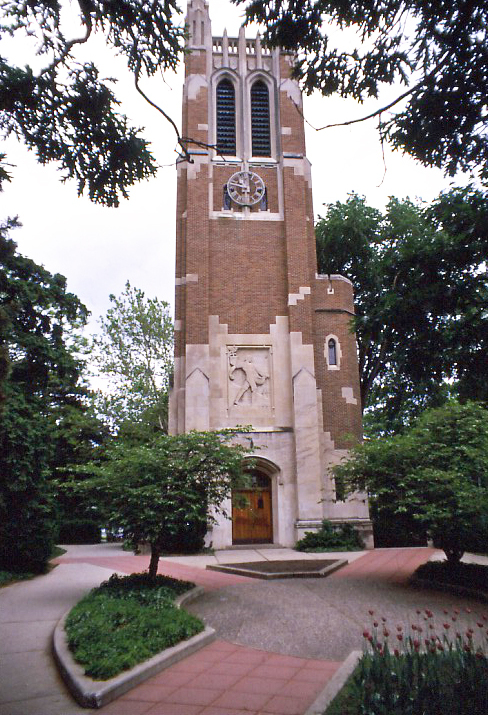
Beaumont Tower

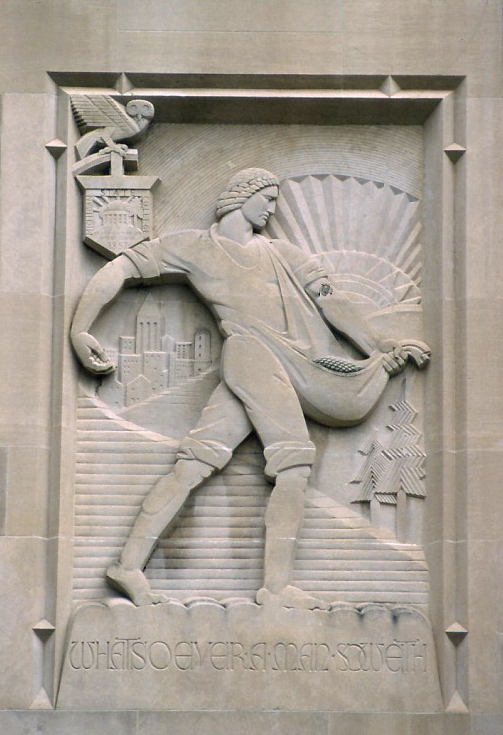
Detail of tower sculpture

== Sources ==
- Doyle, John M., Saint Aloysius Church: The Old and the New, Centennial Publishing Company, Detroit, 1930.
- Eckert, Kathryn Bishop (1993). Buildings of Michigan. New York: Oxford University Press. ISBN 978-0-19-509379-7.
- Ferry, W. Hawkins, The Buildings of Detroit: A History, Wayne State University Press, Detroit, 1968.
- Hill, Eric J.; John Gallagher (2002). AIA Detroit: The American Institute of Architects Guide to Detroit Architecture. Wayne State University Press. ISBN 0-8143-3120-3.
- Meyer, Katherine Mattingly; Martin C.P. McElroy (1980). Detroit Architecture A.I.A. Guide Revised Edition. Wayne State University Press. ISBN 0-8143-1651-4.
- Reade, Marjorie and Susan Wineburg, Historic Buildings: Ann Arbor, Michigan, Ann Arbor Historical Foundation, 1992.
- Savage, Rebecca Binno and Greg Kowalski, Art Deco in Detroit (Images of America), Arcadia Publishing, 2004.
- Sharoff, Robert (2005). American City: Detroit Architecture. Wayne State University Press. ISBN 0-8143-3270-6.
