= Penobscot Block =

Office buildings in Detroit, Michigan

Coordinates: 42.330278°N 83.047222°W

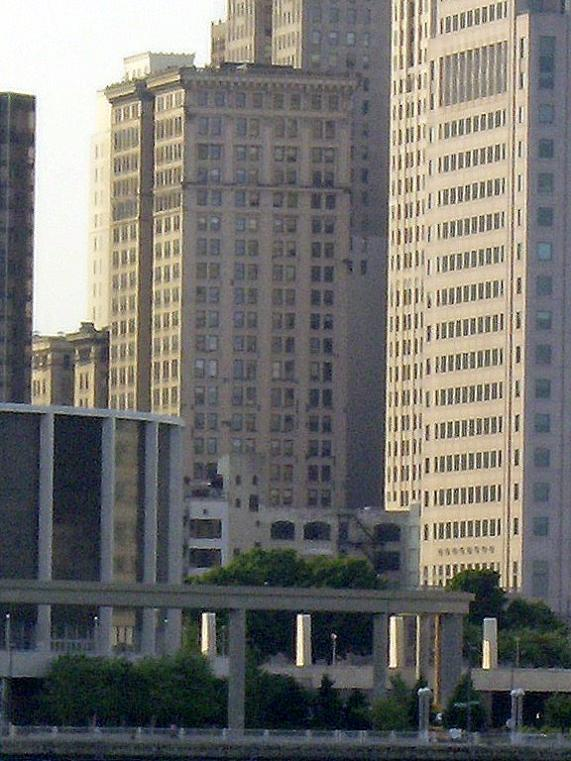
Penobscot Building Annex is part of the 3 building Penobscot Block.

The Penobscot Block is a complex of office towers in downtown Detroit, Michigan, United States.

The block includes four major buildings. The original 13-story Penobscot Building, the 28-story Penobscot Building Annex, and the prominent 45-story Greater Penobscot Building are connected; the unrelated Ford Building stands adjacent to the three at the southeast corner of the block.

The block is also bordered to the west (along Shelby Street) by the Savoyard Centre, previously known as the Peoples Savings Bank Building and 151 West Fort.
