= Penobscot Building (1905) =

- U.S. Historic district – Contributing property
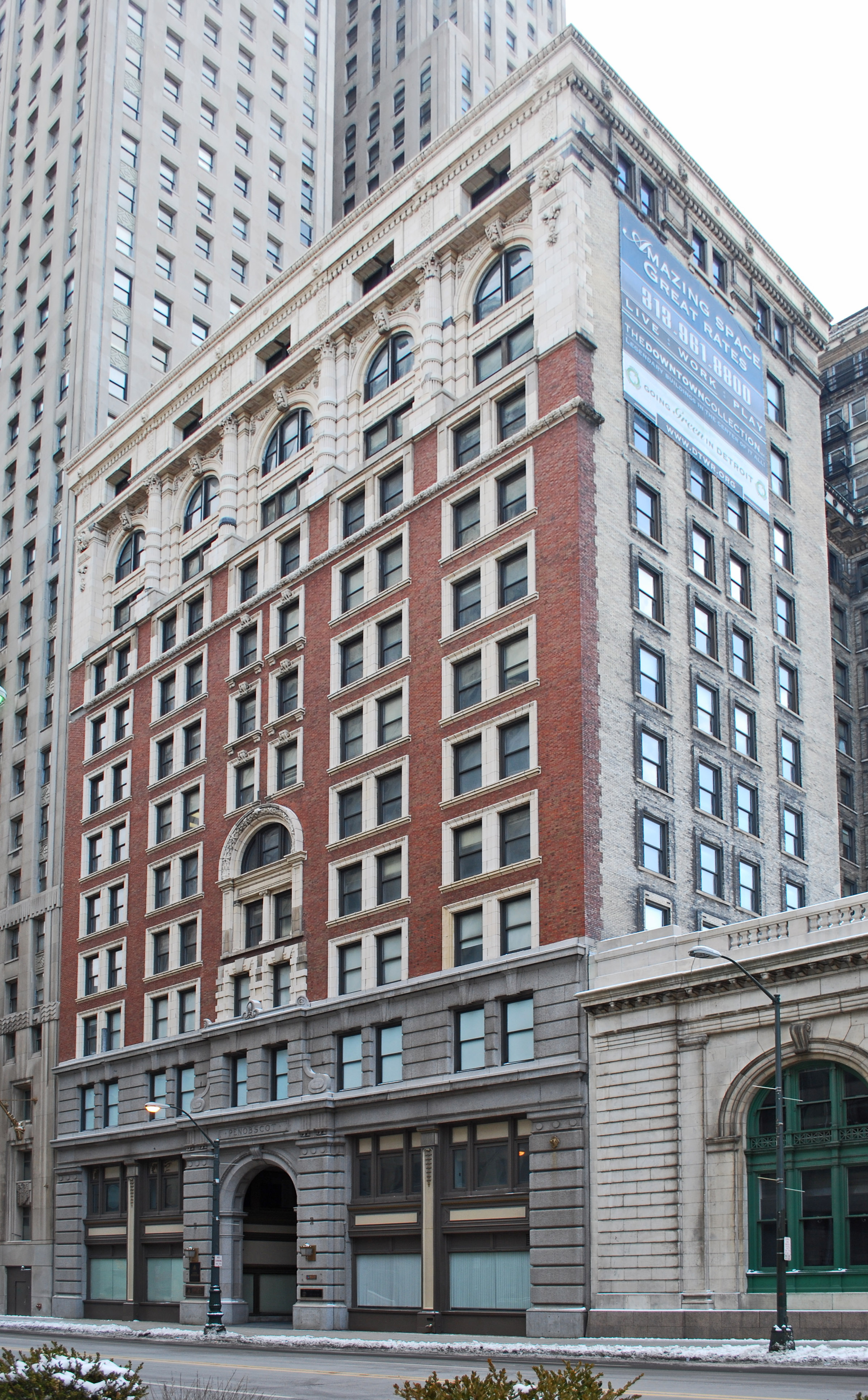
- Location: 131 West Fort Street; Detroit, Michigan
- Coordinates: 42°19′48.5″N 83°2′53.2″W
- Built: 1905
- Architect: Donaldson and Meier
- Architectural style: Beaux-Arts
- Part of: Detroit Financial District (ID09001067)
- Designated CP: December 14, 2009

The Penobscot Building is the original 13-story building of the Penobscot Block complex in downtown Detroit, Michigan. It is the first Penobscot Building, and one of three buildings of the same name in the later-constructed complex. It is located at 131 West Fort Street, within the Detroit Financial District.

== History ==
The Penobscot Building was designed by Donaldson and Meier in the Beaux-Arts style, and incorporates brick and stone into its materials. Construction began in 1904 and was completed in 1905. Its building was financed by prominent Detroit businessmen, including lumberman Simon J. Murphy, Sr.

== Architecture ==
The lower three stories of the building are faced in limestone, the middle seven in brick, and the upper three in terra cotta. The façade is divided into five bays, each with a pair of double-hung windows. Corinthian column piers front the eleventh and twelfth stories, and the original building cornice has been removed.

== Present day ==
The present day use of the office building is primarily for retail shops and services. It is a contributing property in the Detroit Financial Historic District, and on the National Register of Historic Places.

== See also ==
- Penobscot Building (47-story tower)
- Penobscot Building Annex
- Penobscot Block
- National Register of Historic Places listings in Detroit, Michigan
