= Penobscot Building Annex =

Penobscot Annex
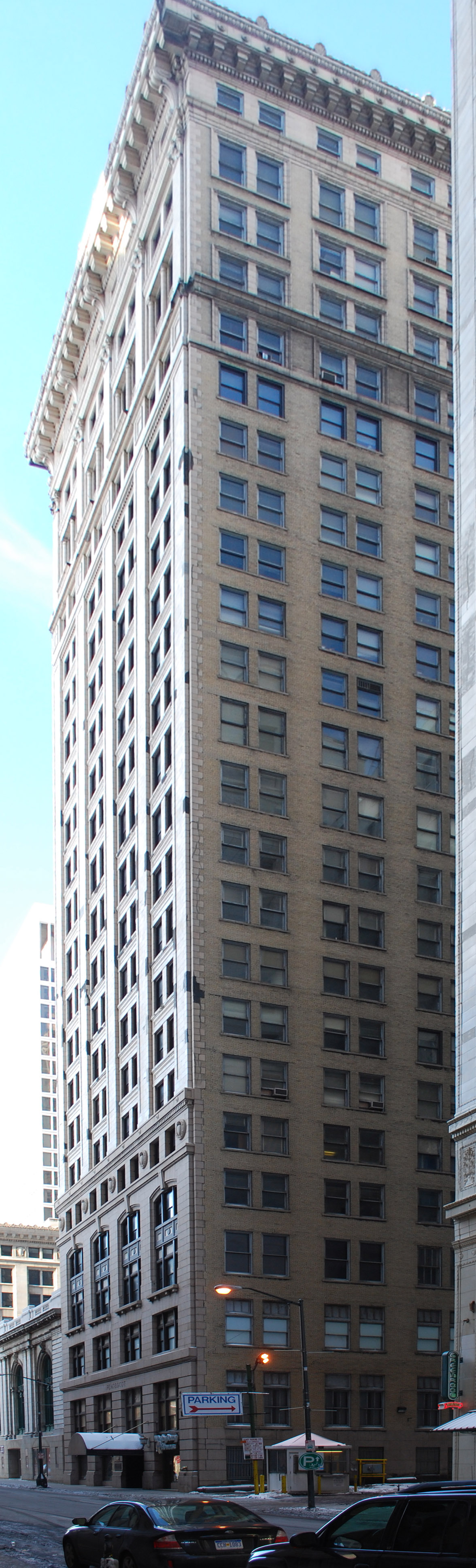
- Alternative names: New Penobscot Building

General information
- Status: Completed
- Type: Commercial offices
- Architectural style: Chicago School
- Location: 144 West Congress Street; Detroit, Michigan
- Coordinates: 42.32966°N 83.04768°W
- Completed: 1916

Height
- Roof: 94.49 m (310.0 ft)

Technical details
- Floor count: 23
- Lifts/elevators: 6

Design and construction
- Architect: Donaldson & Meier
- Penobscot Building Annex
- U.S. Historic district – Contributing property
- Part of: Detroit Financial District (ID09001067)
- Designated CP: December 14, 2009

The Penobscot Building Annex is a 23-story, 94.49 m (310.0 ft) office skyscraper located at 144 West Congress Street in Downtown Detroit, Michigan. This portion of the Penobscot Block is now physically connected to the newer Penobscot Building Tower.

The Penobscot Building Annex is a contributing property in the Detroit Financial Historic District, and on the National Register of Historic Places.

== Architecture ==
The Penobscot Building Annex was designed by the architectural firm of Donaldson and Meier and completed in 1916. The building features a Renaissance-inspired theme, with the lower five stories faced with grey granite, and the upper section faced with lighter terra cotta and ashlar. The lower section of the facade contains broad triple windows; the upper part has pairs of double-hung windows. The top four stories are separated from the lower floors by a band of terra cotta with blind reliefs. The entrance is flanked by retail shop windows, and more retail shops are located in the first-floor interior.

== Gallery ==
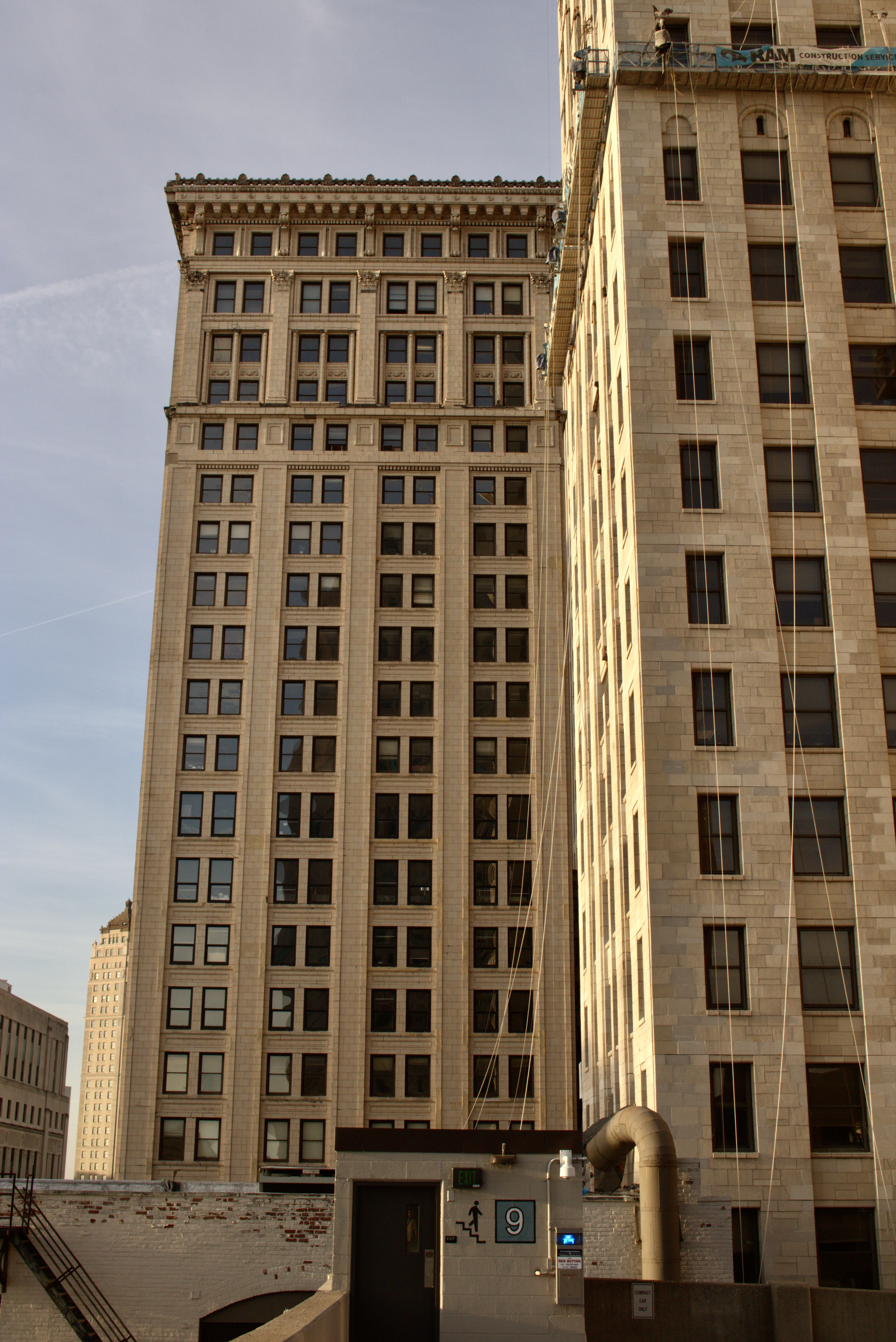
View of the Penobscot Annex with the Buhl Building in the foreground

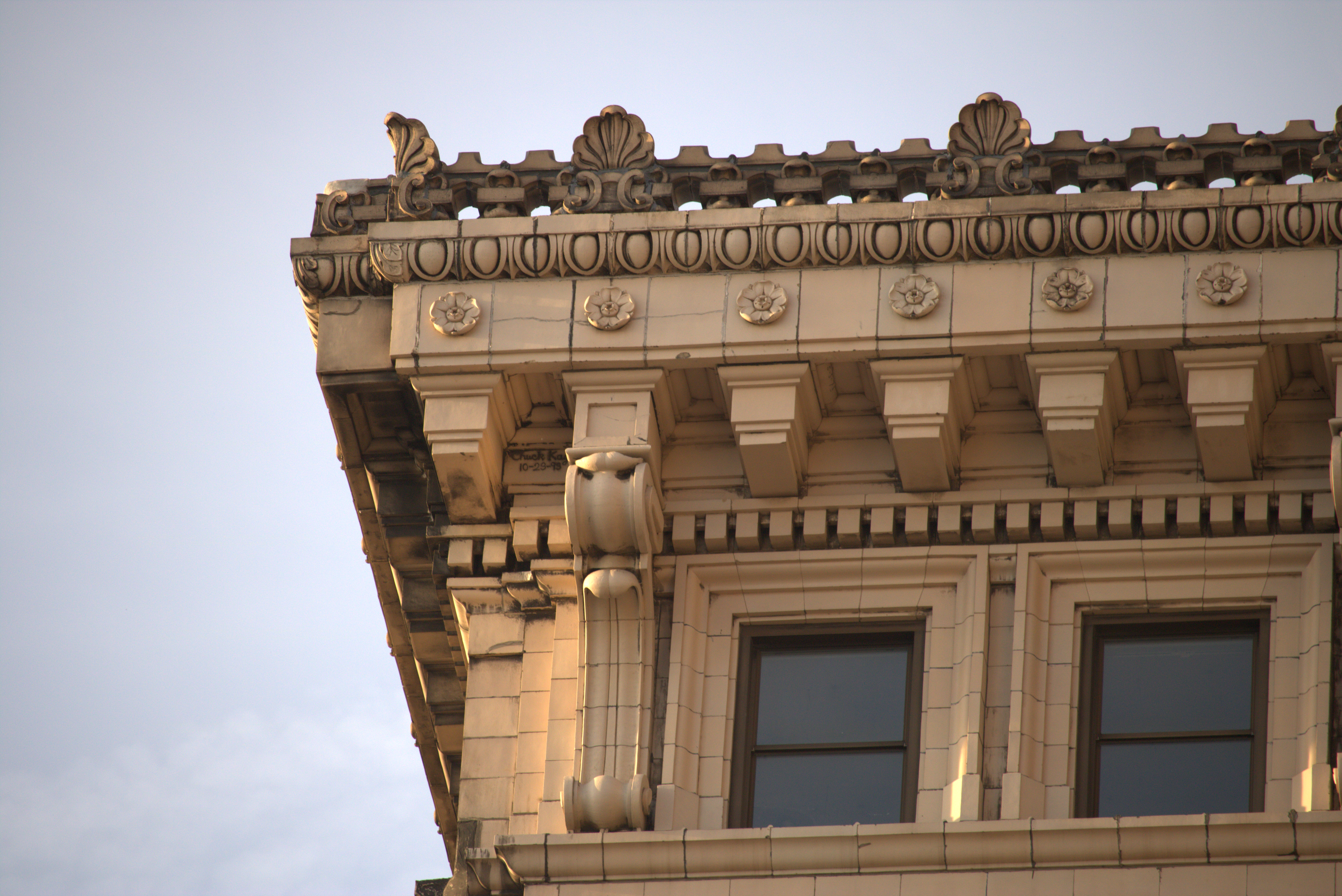
View of the Penobscot Annex's Cornice

== See also ==
- Penobscot Building (1905) — oldest
- Penobscot Building — newest
- List of tallest buildings in Detroit
- National Register of Historic Places listings in Downtown and Midtown Detroit, Michigan
