= Timeline of Detroit =

The following is a timeline of the history of the U.S. city of Detroit, Michigan.

== 18th century ==
- 1701 - Antoine de La Mothe Cadillac, accompanied by approximately one hundred fellow Frenchmen and an additional one hundred Algonquian Indians, established Fort Pontchartrain du Detroit on a site that is today in downtown Detroit.
  - July 24: Antoine de Lamothe Cadillac, with his lieutenant Alphonse de Tonty and a company of 100 men, establishes a trading post on the Detroit River under orders from the French king Louis XIV. They named it Fort Pontchartrain du Détroit, in homage to the Count of Pontchartrain, the Royal Minister of Marine.
  - Ste. Anne de Detroit Catholic Church is the first building built in Detroit, started within two days of Cadillac's landing.
- 1712 - Fort besieged by Fox and Sauk; Fox Wars begin.
- 1750 - Population: 650 (approximate).
- 1760 - British Major Robert Rogers and a group of his Rogers' Rangers take formal command of Fort Detroit during the French and Indian War.
- 1763 - Pontiac besieges Detroit during Pontiac's Rebellion.
- 1778 - Fort Lernault built.
- 1783 - The area south of the Great Lakes (including all of Michigan) is ceded by Great Britain to the United States by the Treaty of Paris that ended the American Revolutionary War. However, the British kept actual possession.
- 1796 - Fort Shelby and all other British posts in Michigan are turned over to the United States under terms of the Jay Treaty. Wayne County, containing Fort Shelby, was established as an administrative division of the Northwest Territory.

== 19th century ==
- 1805
  - June 11: The Great Fire of 1805 burns virtually the entire city. The city's motto, Speramus meliora; resurget cineribus ("We hope for better things, it will rise from the ashes") dates from this event.
  - Detroit becomes capital of Michigan Territory.
- 1806
  - September 13: City of Detroit incorporated by the territorial governing council.
  - Solomon Sibley becomes mayor.
- 1809 - February 24: Territorial governing council repeals the 1806 incorporation of the city.
- 1810
  - Methodist Episcopal Society formed.
  - Population: 770.
- 1812 - August 16: Detroit surrenders without firing a shot to a small British-Indian army under General Isaac Brock in the War of 1812.
- 1813 - September: British forces retreat from Detroit after the Battle of Lake Erie, and the city would serve as a base for the American invasion of Upper Canada.
- 1815 - October 24: territorial governing council enacts the charter for the City of Detroit to be governed by a five-person board of trustees.
- 1817
  - Catholepistemiad (University of Michigan) established.
  - Detroit Book Store in business.
- 1818
  - Walk-in-the-Water Great Lakes passenger steamboat begins operating.
  - Detroit Mechanics' Society formed.
- 1824 - August 5: newly formed territorial legislature reorganizes city government, creating the Common Council and office of mayor.
- 1828 - Capitol building constructed.
- 1831
  - Democratic Free Press newspaper begins publication.
  - Detroit Athenaeum active.
- 1832 - Cholera epidemic.
- 1833
  - June 14: Blackburn Riot.
  - Roman Catholic diocese of Detroit established.
- 1835 - June 29: State constitution adopted.
- 1836 - Municipal water works established.
- 1837
  - City becomes capital of the new U.S. State of Michigan (until 1847).
  - University of Michigan relocated from Detroit to Ann Arbor.
- 1837 to 1838 - Small bands of self-proclaimed "Patriots", some operating from Detroit, invade Canada in the Patriot War.
- 1838 - Detroit-Pontiac railway begins operating.
- 1840 - Population: 9,102.
- 1843 - Michigan State Convention of Colored Citizens meets in Detroit.
- 1845 - Detroit News begins publication.
- 1846 - Elmwood Cemetery established.
- 1848
  - State capital relocated from Detroit to Lansing.
  - Saints Peter and Paul Church built.
- 1850
  - Temple Beth El congregation formed.
  - Population: 21,019.
- 1854 - "Rail connection between Detroit and New York City" begins operating.
- 1860 - Population: 45,619.
- 1863 - Anti-draft and race riot in Detroit.
- 1865
  - Detroit Public Library and Detroit Police Department established.
  - Michigan State Equal Rights League Convention meets in Detroit.
- 1868 - Detroit College of Medicine founded.
- 1870 - Population: 79,577.
- 1871 - Detroit City Hall built.
- 1872 - Michigan Soldiers' and Sailors' Monument unveiled.
- 1877 - Detroit College (now the University of Detroit Mercy and U of D Jesuit HS) is founded by the Society of Jesus.
- 1879 - Belle Isle becomes part of city.
- 1880 - Population: 116,340.
- 1881 - Future industrialist William Boeing born.
- 1885
  - Detroit Museum of Art established.
  - Detroit College of Medicine active.
- 1887 - Detroit Symphony Orchestra formed.
- 1890
  - Reformist Hazen Pingree becomes mayor.
  - "Free music in city parks" begins.
  - Population: 205,876.
- 1891 - Detroit College of Law established.
- 1893 - Palmer Park established.
- 1894 - Mayor "establishes vegetable gardens for the poor" ("Pingree's Potato Patches").
- 1895 - "Public lighting" begins.
- 1896
  - Charles Brady King becomes the first person to drive an automobile in Detroit.
  - Ford Quadricycle created by Henry Ford.
  - Bennett Park baseball field opens.
- 1899 - Detroit Automobile Company in business.
- 1900
  - Population: 285,704.
  - Area of city: 29 square miles.

== 20th century ==
=== 1900s-1950s ===
- 1900: At the beginning of the century, Detroit had 285,704 residents (13th largest city in the U.S.
- 1901
  - Detroit Tigers baseball team formed.
- 1902
  - Cadillac Automobile Company in business.
  - Wayne County Courthouse built.
  - Future aviator Charles Lindbergh born.
- 1903
  - Ford Motor Company and Pewabic Pottery in business.
  - Board of Commerce formed.
- 1904
  - Belle Isle Aquarium opens.
- 1907
  - Detroit auto show begins.
  - Area of city: 41 square miles.
- 1909 - Ford Building constructed.
- 1911: Chevrolet opens its first factory in Detroit. This was significant in the birth of Detroit as the center of the American automobile industry, something that became huge in the city's economy and overall identity.
- 1912
  - Navin Field (baseball park) opens.
  - Dime Building constructed.
- 1913
  - 1913 Studebaker strike
  - Broadway-Strand Theatre in business.
- 1914 - Detroit Institute of Musical Arts founded.
- 1915 - Kiwanis Club founded.
- 1916: Large influx of African Americans into the city during the Great Migration
- 1917: The World War I Draft occurred. Known as the Selective Service Act of 1917, 24 million men between the ages of 18 and 45 registered to fight. This created many more jobs for African Americans in the city of Detroit as a lot of working men went off to war.
- 1918
  - 1918 influenza epidemic.
  - WW1 ends
- 1919 - Orchestra Hall opens.
- 1920: Detroit becomes the 4th largest city in America
- 1920s: All throughout the 1920s, patterns arose of whites beginning to define black neighborhoods by race. The 8 mile Wyoming colonie became a prominent arena for African Americans. White bureaucrats decided to erect a wall known as the"Detroit Wall" to segregate a black neighborhood in Detroit for real estate purposes. Paradise Valley also became a place that many blacks were confined to during this time.
  - 8MK radio begins broadcasting.
  - Color-coded traffic light introduced.
  - Future athlete Sugar Ray Robinson born.
  - Population: 993,078.
- 1921 - Detroit Historical Society formed. Organizations in the United States and Canada
- 1923: The Ford Motor Company and African American churches align. During this time, due to Henry Ford's strong relationship with prominent Black ministers in the city, his company was the largest employer of African American workers in all of Detroit. Ford and church leaders worked together in the black community to employ thousands and prevent conflicts between black and white workers.
- 1924 - Ambassador cinema in business.
- 1925
  - Buhl Building constructed.
  - Ossian Sweet riots. A large crowd was protesting outside Ossian Sweet's house because they did not want him moving into their neighborhood. Rocks were thrown at his home and many windows were broken. Sweet responded by shooting into the crowd and was subsequently charged with murder.
- 1927
  - Detroit City Airport begins
  - Detroit Institute of Arts built.
- 1928
  - Detroit Zoo opens.
  - Skyscrapers Fisher Building and Penobscot Building built.
  - Evans Gliding Club formed.
- 1929
  - Ambassador Bridge construction completed.
  - Union Trust Building (skyscraper) built.
- 1930
  - Detroit-Windsor Tunnel construction completed.
  - Detroit's electric streetcar systems peaks in size with 30 lines stretching over 534 miles.
  - Population: 1,568,662.
  - Wayne County Airport dedicated.
- 1932: Federal Home Loan Bank (FHLB) Act was passed. This act served to form the Federal Home Loan Bank Board which supervised loan institutions and to lower the overall cost of home ownership.
- 1933
  - Formation of Home Owners' Loan Cooperation (HOLC). Established as part of the New Deal, this group mainly served to help refinance home mortgages that faced a risk of foreclosure due to the 1929 economic crash and the housing industry collapse.
  - Diego Rivera paints Detroit Industry Murals in the Institute of Arts.
- 1934: Formation of the Federal Housing Authority. The FHA is responsible for setting standards for construction and insuring and underwriting loans made by various lenders.
- 1935
  - The United Auto Workers labor union was founded. Ford was the first company to sign a contract with them, again showing the impact that the Ford Motor Company has had throughout Detroit's history.
  - Detroit Tigers baseball team win 1935 World Series defeating the Chicago Cubs 4 games to 2. The season was their 35th since they entered the American League in 1901. It was the first World Series championship for the Tigers.
- 1936: 239 maps were commissioned by FHLB for the HOLC and the FHA. The FHLB determined which neighborhoods were safe for loans and which were not. This resulted in redlining and Blacks found it very difficult to get loans.
- 1937
  - The Wagner-Steagall Housing Act is passed. This provided a large amount of money for public housing.
  - Citizen's housing and planning council formed in Detroit
- 1939 - Future film director Francis Ford Coppola born.
- 1940 - Population: 1,623,452.
- 1941
  - A lot of war production was occurring
  - The Davidson Freeway was built (the first urban one ever built in the U.S).
  - Exec Order 8802 (FEPC) - mandated non discrimination in the workplace (factories)
  - Electric streetcars run on Woodward Avenue every 60 seconds at peak times.
- 1942: Pickets at Sojourner Truth Housing
- 1943: - The Detroit riot. A race riot, spurred by competition among black and white residents for wartime factory jobs, resulted in 34 deaths.
- 1944
  - GI Bill was passed.
  - Blacks had trouble buying property outside redline areas and couldn't get loans to buy within red line areas.
  - Future singer Diana Ross born.
- 1945 - Detroit Tigers won the 1945 World Series.
- 1946 - Russell Kelly Office Service
- 1948: Shelley v Kraemer. The decision ruled that restrictive covenants cannot be enforced. However, it was ineffective to get people to stop using them because they didn't want their neighborhood to get a poor rating.
- 1949: Taft Ellender Wagner Act is passed. This resulted in more funding for public housing.

=== 1950s-1990s ===
- 1950
  - United Auto Workers sign agreement with General Motors ("Reuther's Treaty of Detroit").
  - Detroit's population reaches its height at 1.85 million.
- 1951 - Detroit celebrates its 250th anniversary with exhibitions, parades, lectures, entertainments, historical publications, new building construction and more.
- 1954 - City-County Building constructed.
- 1955
  - Anna Scripps Whitcomb Conservatory on Belle Isle active.
  - Charles Diggs becomes U.S. representative for Michigan's 13th congressional district.
- 1956 - Electric streetcar service discontinued on Detroit's last line along Woodward Avenue.
- 1958
  - Wayne State University's McGregor Memorial Conference Center built.
  - The Spirit of Detroit statue is dedicated.
- 1959 - Pavilion Apartments built in Lafayette Park.
- 1960
  - Motown Records in business.
  - Cobo Hall convention center opens.
  - Sister city agreement established with Toyota, Japan.
  - Population: 1,670,144.
- 1961 - Jerome Cavanagh is elected mayor.
- 1963 - Great March to Freedom.
- 1964
  - November 21: Newspaper strike ends.
  - Intermittent windshield wiper for vehicles invented.
- 1965
  - Wright Museum of African American History established.
  - John Conyers becomes U.S. representative for Michigan's 1st congressional district.
- 1967
  - July 23: 12th Street Riot, one of the worst riots in United States history, begins on 12th Street in the predominantly African American inner city (43 killed, 342 injured and 1,400 buildings burned).
  - Wayne County Community College established.
  - Fisher Freeway opens.
- 1968
  - October 10: At Busch Memorial Stadium in St. Louis, Missouri the Detroit Tigers won game 7 & won the World Series.
  - Focus: HOPE founded by William T. Cunningham.
- 1970
  - Detroit Science Center founded.
  - Population: 1,511,482.
- 1973 - Coleman Young elected Detroit's first black mayor—a position he would hold for 20 years.
- 1977 - Renaissance Center skyscraper complex built.
- 1978 - January: Great Blizzard of 1978.
- 1979–1980 - Saddam Hussein makes large donations to a Detroit church and receives a key to the city. Hussein's relationship with Detroit began in 1979, when the Reverend Jacob Yasso of Chaldean Sacred Heart congratulated Hussein on his presidency. Yasso said that in return his church had received $450,000 from the former Iraqi dictator.
- 1980
  - The national economic malaise of the 1970s culminated in Detroit hosting the Republican National Convention which nominated Ronald Reagan who stayed at the Renaissance Center while in Detroit. The Detroit convention kicked off Reagan's campaign to a landslide election.
  - Population: 1,203,339.
- 1984 - The Detroit Tigers won the 1984 World Series, defeating the San Diego Padres in five games.
- 1987
  - August 16: Airplane crash occurs near city.
  - Pope John Paul II visits Detroit.
  - Detroit People Mover operations started. It was the first city and for a long time only railway transit in the city. Operations are driverless.
- 1988 - Bel-Air cinema in business.
- 1990
  - Nelson Mandela visits Detroit.
  - Population: 1,027,974.
- 1992 - November 5: Black motorist Malice Green dies after struggling with white policemen Larry Nevers and Walter Budzyn during a traffic stop. The officers were later convicted and sentenced to prison. The convictions were overturned, but the officers were retried and convicted of lesser charges.
- 1993 - One Detroit Center skyscraper built.
- 1994 - Nancy Kerrigan is attacked in the Cobo Arena shortly before the 1994 U.S. Figure Skating Championships, which were taking place in Detroit. The attack renders her unable to take part.
- 1995 - July: Detroit newspaper strike of 1995–97 begins.
- 1996
  - November: Michigan votes to allow the operation of three casinos in Detroit.
  - Detroit Opera House renovated.
- 1997 - June: Detroit Red Wings ice hockey team wins their first Stanley Cup in 42 years.
- 1998 - City website online (approximate date).
- 1999 - Detroit Tigers play their final baseball game in classic Tiger Stadium, which had opened in 1912.
- 2000
  - Comerica Park stadium opens.
  - Population 951,270

== 21st century ==
- 2002 - Detroit Lions football team begin play in the new, state-of-the-art Ford Field, returning to downtown Detroit after 27 years in suburban Pontiac.
- 2003
  - August 14: Northeast blackout of 2003.
  - Sister city agreement established with Dubai, United Arab Emirates.
- 2004
  - "Restored" Campus Martius Park opens in downtown Detroit. Featuring an ice-skating rink, it is the focal point of the city's new Winter Blast festival.
  - The Detroit Pistons win the NBA Finals.
- 2005 - Comerica Park hosts Major League Baseball's All-Star Game.
- 2006 - February: city hosts Super Bowl XL, and in October, the Detroit Tigers, only three years after having a 119-loss season, defeat the Oakland A's in the American League Championship Series, winning the Penant. They then play in their first World Series since 1984, losing to their 1968 series rivals, the St. Louis Cardinals, in five games.
- 2008 - Kwame Kilpatrick resigned his office as mayor effective September 19, 2008, after pleading guilty to two counts of obstruction of justice and no contest to one count of assaulting and obstructing a police officer. Kilpatrick was succeeded in office on an interim basis by City Council President Kenneth Cockrel, Jr.
- 2009 - Following a special election in May 2009, businessman and former Detroit Pistons star Dave Bing became the Mayor and was subsequently re-elected to a full term of office.
- 2010 - Population: 713,777.
- 2013
  - Michigan governor Rick Snyder declares a financial emergency and appoints emergency manager Kevyn Orr for the city.
  - Detroit goes bankrupt, the largest ever in American history.
  - November: U.S. federal government grants $24,200,000 to hire firefighters.
- 2014 - Mike Duggan becomes mayor.
  - December: Governor Rick Snyder announced that Detroit had emerged from bankruptcy, and that he had accepted Orr's resignation as emergency manager, returning control of Detroit to its elected government.
- 2016 - June: CNU24, the 24th Congress for the New Urbanism, is held in Detroit. Congress focuses on the city's resurgence and legacy projects.
- 2017
  - May: QLine opened for public use.
  - October: National Women's Convention held.
- 2018 - Bedrock Detroit, owned by Dan Gilbert, announces a $900 million, two building project on the site of the former J.L. Hudson store (which once had the tallest retail tower in the world), including a 58-story tower.
- 2020 - Population: 639,111.

== See also ==
- History of Detroit
- List of mayors of Detroit
- National Register of Historic Places listings in Detroit
- Timeline of Michigan history
- Other cities in Michigan:
  - Timeline of Ann Arbor, Michigan
  - Timeline of Lansing, Michigan

== Bibliography ==
=== Published in 18th-19th century ===
- Jedidiah Morse (1797). "D'Etroit". American Gazetteer. Boston, Massachusetts: At the presses of S. Hall, and Thomas & Andrews. OL 23272543M.
- Samuel R. Brown (1817). "Detroit". Western Gazetteer; or, Emigrant's Directory. Auburn, N.Y: Printed by H.C. Southwick. OCLC 10530489. OL 24649079M.
- James H. Wellings (1845), Directory of the City of Detroit, Detroit: Printed by Harsha & Willcox, OL 23357545M
- James H. Wellings (1846), Directory of the City of Detroit, Detroit: A.S. Williams, printer, OCLC 10900751, OL 6989331M
- Johnston's Detroit Directory. 1855.
- "Detroit", State of Michigan Gazetteer & Business Directory, H. Huntington Lee & Co. & James Sutherland, 1856, pp. 33+
- Johnston's Detroit City Directory, James Dale Johnston & Co, 1861, OCLC 81840923, OL 23526571M
- "Detroit", Michigan State Gazetteer and Business Directory, Charles F. Clark, 1863, pp. 239+
- "Detroit", Appleton's Illustrated Hand-Book of American Cities, New York: D. Appleton and Company, 1876
- "Detroit" . Encyclopædia Britannica. Vol. 7 (9th ed.). 1878. p. 133.
- Silas Farmer (1890). History of Detroit and Wayne County and Early Michigan: a Chronological Cyclopedia (3rd ed.). Detroit.
- Delos Franklin Wilcox (1896), Municipal Government in Michigan and Ohio: A Study in the Relations of City and Commonwealth, Columbia University (About Detroit and Cleveland)
- "Detroit", Michigan State Gazetteer and Business Directory, R.L. Polk & Co., 1897, pp. 481–718

=== Published in 20th century ===
- Robert C. Brooks (1901), "Detroit, Mich.", Bibliography of Municipal Problems and City Conditions, Municipal Affairs, vol. 5 (2nd ed.), New York: Reform Club, OCLC 1855351
- "Detroit". Chambers's Encyclopaedia. London. 1901. hdl:2027/njp.32101065312884.
- Lyman Pierson Powell, ed. (1901), "Detroit", Historic Towns of the Western States, New York: G. P. Putnam's Sons
- Leo M. Franklin (1903), "Detroit", Jewish Encyclopedia, vol. 4, New York, hdl:2027/mdp.49015002282284
- Hugo S. Grosser, ed. (1907), "Detroit", What is What in Our Cities, Book of American Municipalities, League of American Municipalities
- "Detroit", United States (4th ed.), Leipzig: K. Baedeker, 1909, OCLC 02338437 – via Internet Archive
- The Detroiter, Detroit Board of Commerce. 1910-
- "Detroit" . Encyclopædia Britannica. Vol. 8 (11th ed.). 1910. pp. 113–116.
- Floyd Benjamin Streeter (1921). "(Detroit)". Michigan Bibliography. Lansing: Michigan Historical Commission. pp. 99–147.
- Clarence M. Burton, ed. (1922). City of Detroit, Michigan, 1701-1922. Chicago: S. J. Clarke Publishing Company. (5 volumes)
- Stocking, William (1922). "Detroit" . Encyclopædia Britannica. Vol. 30 (12th ed.).
- Federal Writers' Project (1941). "Detroit". Michigan: a Guide to the Wolverine State. American Guide Series. New York: Oxford University Press. pp. 228+. ISBN 9781603540216 – via Google Books.
- Wallace John Bonk (1957), Michigan's first bookstore; a study of the books sold in the Detroit Book Store, 1817-1828, Department of Library Science Studies, Ann Arbor: University of Michigan
- Holli, Melvin G., and Jones, Peter d'A., eds. Biographical Dictionary of American Mayors, 1820-1980 (Greenwood Press, 1981) short scholarly biographies each of the city's mayors 1820 to 1980. online; see index at p. 408-9 for list.
- Steve Babson (1986) [1984]. Working Detroit: The Making of a Union Town. Wayne State University Press. ISBN 0-8143-1819-3.
- Peter Gavrilovich & Bill McGraw (2000). Detroit Almanac: 300 years of life in the motor city.

=== Published in 21st century ===
- Paul S. Boyer, ed. (2001). "Detroit". Oxford Companion to United States History. Oxford University Press. p. 185. ISBN 978-0-19-508209-8.
- David Lee Poremba, Detroit in Its World Setting: A Three Hundred Year Chronology, 1701-2001 (2001).
- Eric J. Hill; John Gallagher (2003). AIA Detroit: the American Institute of Architects Guide to Detroit Architecture. Wayne State University Press. ISBN 0-8143-3120-3.
- David Marley (2005), "United States: Detroit", Historic Cities of the Americas, Santa Barbara, California: ABC-CLIO, pp. 557+, ISBN 1576070271
- Paul T. Hellmann (2006). "Michigan: Detroit". Historical Gazetteer of the United States. Taylor & Francis. ISBN 1-135-94859-3.
- Michael O. Smith (2007). "Detroit, Michigan". In David Goldfield (ed.). Encyclopedia of American Urban History. Sage. pp. 218+. ISBN 978-1-4522-6553-7.
- Dan Austin (2010). Lost Detroit: Stories Behind the Motor City's Majestic Ruins. Arcadia. ISBN 978-1-62584-237-4.
- Catherine Cangany (2014). Frontier Seaport: Detroit's Transformation into an Atlantic Entrepôt. American Beginnings, 1500-1900. University of Chicago Press. ISBN 978-0-226-09684-1.
