= Ellie Reed (disambiguation) =

Ellie Reed is an American actress.

Ellie Reed may also refer to:

- Ellie Reed, contestant on series seven of the UK version of The Apprentice

== See also ==
- Eleanor Josaitis (1931–2011), born Eleanor Reed, American activist, co-founder of Focus HOPE
- Elli Burris, born Elli Reed, American soccer player
