= William T. Cunningham =

William T. Cunningham (1930 – May 26, 1997), a Detroit native, began studies for priesthood in 1943 at Sacred Heart Seminary. Cunningham was a parish priest for five years, then in 1961 joined the faculty of Sacred Heart Seminary as an English professor. He was a columnist and book review editor of the Michigan Catholic. Cunningham and Eleanor Josaitis co-founded Focus: HOPE, a non-profit civil and human rights organization intended to help to resolve discrimination and injustice and to build a harmonious community on March 6, 1968, spurred by the destructive 1967 Detroit riot they witnessed. Cunningham died of a liver infection following cancer surgery in 1997. In 2005, members from the Church of the Madonna and its music director, William S. Harrison, honored Cunningham's legacy with the Fr. William T. Cunningham Memorial Choir, which has won both national and international choral competitions.

== Awards ==
- NAACP's Ira W. Jayne Memorial Medal
- Temple Israel Brotherhood Award
- Bishop Donnelly Alumni Award
- Jefferson Award
- UCS Executive of the Year Award
- Jessie Slaton Award of the Detroit Association of Black Organizations
- National Governor's Association Award (twice)
- 1987 Detroit News Michiganian of the Year Award
- Salvation Army's William Booth Award
- Marquette University Alumni Award
- University of Michigan 1993 Business Leadership Award
