= Timeline of Michigan history =

Flag of Michigan

== Natural history ==
- 13000 BC to 12000 BC The most recent of four major glaciers (Wisconsin glaciation) started to recede, leaving a tundra-like environment. The melting ice formed the Great Lakes, the Upper Peninsula and Lower Peninsula (in the Michigan Basin).
- 12800 BC Mastodons and other ice age mammals started to appear in the fossil record.
- 11000 BC to 9000 BC Archeological evidence of Paleo-Indians appeared, in the form of sharpened stone tool points known as fluted biface.

== French colonization ==
- 1621 or 1622 Étienne Brûlé and his companion Roosevelt paddled up the St. Mary's River and entered Lake Superior.
- 1634 Jean Nicolet, guided by the Wyandot, passed through the Straits of Mackinac and followed the southern shoreline of the Upper Peninsula, en route to find the Ho-Chunk and the imagined passage to the Pacific.
- 1641 Jesuit priests Isaac Jogues and Charles Raymbault followed the same route as Brûlé, finding many Ojibwa at the St. Mary's River rapids and naming it Sault Ste. Marie.
- 1653 The Iroquois Wars virtually emptied the Lower Peninsula of Native Americans and cut off the Ottawa River route and the St. Lawrence River route into Michigan.
- 1659 Pierre-Esprit Radisson and Médard des Groseilliers traveled to western Lake Superior with an envoy of fur trading Native Americans returning from Montreal.
- 1661 Father René Menard retraced the route of Radisson and Groseilliers to find the Wyandot, wintered in L'Anse, and then disappeared traveling inland from Chequamegon Bay.
- 1665 Claude-Jean Allouez and six Voyageurs retraced Menard's route to find him and the Wyandot; they reported copper deposits in the Keweenaw Peninsula area.
- 1668 Father Jacques Marquette established Sault Ste. Marie, the first European settlement in what is now Michigan.
- 1669 Jean Talon sent Adrien Jolliet and Jean Peré on a mission to investigate the Allouez copper reports. Peré appears to have abandoned the mission in favor of fur trading. An Iroquois warrior guided Jolliet's return trip along the eastern shoreline of the Lower Peninsula and down the St. Clair and Detroit Rivers. That may have been the first visit of a European to the Lower Peninsula.
- 1671 June 14 – In "The Pageant of the Sault" at Sault Ste. Marie, Ontario, four Jesuit priests led by Father Claude-Jean Allouez, representing the Roman Catholic Church, and Simon Francois Daumont St. Lusson held aloft a sword and a symbolic tuft of sod, declaring to the Native Americans that all of the Great Lakes country was henceforth a possession of King Louis XIV of France.
- 1671 Father Claude Dablon took over the mission at the Sault, and Marquette moved to establish a mission at St. Ignace.
- 1679 René Robert Cavelier, Sieur de La Salle sailed Le Griffon to St. Ignace and on to an island at the inlet of Green Bay, departed from there with 14 men via canoe south on Lake Michigan, and established Fort Miami.
- 1680 La Salle abandoned Fort Miami and made an overland trip across the Lower Peninsula.
- 1683 Louis de la Porte, Sieur de Louvigny and 150 French soldiers established Fort de Buade at St. Ignace.
- 1684 The mission of St. Joseph was established in Niles by Claude-Jean Allouez.
- 1686 Daniel Greysolon, Sieur du Lhut established Fort St. Joseph in what is now Port Huron.
- 1691 Marquis de Denonville sent Augustin le Gardeur de Courtemanche to establish another Fort St. Joseph at the Jesuit mission that had been formed around 1684 at modern Niles, Michigan.
- 1701 Antoine de Lamothe Cadillac, with his lieutenant Alphonse de Tonty, established a settlement on the Detroit River which they named Fort Pontchartrain du Détroit, today the city of Detroit. Their wives joined them and are said to be the first European women in Michigan.
- 1710 Cadillac was removed from Fort Pontchartrain du Détroit and replaced by Charles Regnault, Sieur Dubuisson. Before leaving, Cadillac invited the Meskwaki to live around the fort.
- 1712 The Meskwaki were not welcomed by the tribes living around Detroit, and Dubuisson ordered them to leave. They refused, and a fight broke out for 19 days, leading to the Fox Wars.
- 1715 Fort de Buade was abandoned and Fort Michilimackinac was constructed in what is now Mackinaw City, Michigan.
- 1720 to 1744 was a period of peace, fur trading and little expansion in the part of New France that would become Michigan.
- 1758 During the French and Indian War, Fort Frontenac was captured by British forces cutting off New France's St. Lawrence River supply and communication conduits into Michigan.
- 1760 Fort Pontchartrain du Détroit was peacefully turned over to the British after Quebec was defeated.

== British colonization ==
- 1763 In the Treaty of Paris, France ceded all lands in New France east of the Mississippi River to Great Britain, ending the French colonial period in Michigan.
- 1763 Odawa leader Pontiac led a major revolt of Native Americans against the British, besieging Fort Detroit.
- 1763 George III of Great Britain proclaimed that the newly acquired North American land – except Quebec, West Florida and East Florida – would be an Indian Reserve, prohibiting settlement without British permission west of the Appalachian Mountains.
- 1774 The Parliament of Great Britain passed the Quebec Act, which expanded Quebec's borders south to the Ohio River.
- 1783 The area that is now Michigan was included with the territory ceded by Great Britain to the United States by the Treaty of Paris that ended the American Revolutionary War. However, the U.S. did not take control of the territory until 1796.
- 1796 Detroit and other posts in Michigan were turned over to the United States under terms of the Jay Treaty. Wayne County was established as an administrative division of the Northwest Territory.

== U.S. territory ==
- 1805 Michigan Territory was created, with Detroit designated as the seat of government. William Hull appointed as governor. Detroit was destroyed by fire.
- 1812 Detroit and Mackinac Island were captured by the British in the War of 1812.
- 1813 Detroit was recovered from the British by future-President William Henry Harrison.
- 1813 Lewis Cass became Territorial Governor.
- 1817 The University of Michigan was established in Detroit, the first public university in the state.
- 1818 The British ceded control of the several islands of the Upper Peninsula and in the St. Clair River to the U.S. after the Treaty of Ghent and border negotiations were concluded.
- 1819 In the Treaty of Saginaw, the Ojibwe, Ottawa, and Potawatomi ceded more than six million acres (24,000 km^{2}) in the central portion of the Lower Peninsula of Michigan to the United States.
- 1821 With the 1821 Treaty of Chicago, the Ojibwe, Ottawa, and Potawatomi ceded all the lands south of the Grand River to the United States.
- 1823 Congress transferred legislative powers previously exercised by the Territorial Governor and Judges to a nine-member Legislative Council, appointed by the U.S. president, who selected them from eighteen persons chosen by the people. The council was expanded to thirteen members in 1825 and made an elected body in 1827.
- 1824 The Chicago Road was surveyed between Fort Dearborn in Chicago and Detroit. Besides its original military purpose, it became a major avenue for settlement and trade.
- 1828 The British turned over their fort on Drummond Island to the United States.
- 1828 Lewis Cass and Henry Schoolcraft established the Historical Society of Michigan.
- 1832 The Territorial Capitol was built in Detroit at a cost of $24,500.
- 1833 The Detroit Arsenal was constructed in Dearborn, Michigan, to serve the territorial militia and the regular army.
- 1833 Treaty of Chicago
- 1835 The First Constitutional Convention was held. Stevens T. Mason was inaugurated as the first Governor of Michigan. A minor conflict with Ohio, known as the Toledo War, over an area including the city of Toledo, Ohio, delayed Michigan statehood, because the State of Ohio objected.
- 1836 Michigan accepted Ohio's claim to Toledo and the Toledo Strip and received, as compensation, the western three-fourths of the Upper Peninsula.
- 1836 In the Treaty of Washington, representatives of the Ottawa and Chippewa nations of Native Americans ceded an area of 13,837,207 acres (55,997 km^{2}) in the northwest portion of the Lower Peninsula of Michigan and the eastern portion of the Upper Peninsula of Michigan. This area represents approximately 37% of the current land area of the state of Michigan.
- 1837 Michigan was admitted as a free state into the union (the 26th state). It was admitted a few months after the slave state of Arkansas.

== As a U.S. state ==
- 1837 The Panic of 1837 was a severe setback to the nascent state bank and to several ambitious programs of public improvements, including the Clinton-Kalamazoo Canal.
- 1838 The Patriot War saw Irish nationalists invade Upper Canada from southeast Michigan.
- 1840 Douglass Houghton reported finding copper deposits on the Keweenaw Peninsula.
- 1842 The Treaty of La Pointe was the last Native American land cession in Michigan.
- 1846 Marji-Gesick, an Ojibwa Indian, pointed out a large deposit of iron ore to prospector Philo Everett near the present-day city of Negaunee.
- 1847 Under the leadership of Albertus van Raalte, Dutch Calvinist separatists founded Holland, Michigan, in southwest Michigan.
- 1847 A law was passed by the State Legislature to re-locate the state capital from Detroit to a site "in the township of Lansing, in the county of Ingham".
- 1849 Michigan State Normal College was founded in Ypsilanti as the first normal college west of the Appalachian Mountains.
- 1854 The first official meeting of the group that called itself the "Republican Party" was held in Jackson.
- 1855 Michigan State University was founded as the Agricultural College of the State of Michigan, becoming the first land grant university in the United States.
- 1861-1865 Michigan sent 90,000 men, nearly a quarter of the state's male population, to fight in state regiments in the Civil War.
- 1871 Fires burned Manistee and Holland.
- 1872 The first rail connections reached Northern Michigan port cities. The Grand Rapids and Indiana Railroad reached Traverse City in December 1872 (via Walton Junction and Traverse City Rail Road Company) and reached Petoskey in 1873. The Flint and Pere Marquette Railroad completed its terminal at Ludington in 1874. While the Michigan Central Railroad reached Otsego County in the fall of 1872, Cheboygan and Mackinaw City did not have rail service until the early 1880s.
- 1879 The new State Capitol was dedicated in Lansing. The structure cost $1,510,130.
- 1890s and 1900s (decade) Ford, Chrysler and General Motors were among many automotive companies founded in southeastern Michigan.
- 1919 The State Trunkline Highway System was created as an act of the state legislature which took effect on May 13.
- 1928 Construction of the Ford River Rouge Plant was completed. It was the largest integrated factory complex in the world, employing 100,000 people
- 1929 The Ambassador Bridge opened between Detroit and Windsor, Ontario. It was the longest bridge in the world when built. The Detroit-Windsor Tunnel opened the next year.
- 1937 The Flint Sit-Down Strike ended with official recognition of the United Auto Workers by General Motors.
- 1941-1945 During World War II, Detroit was called the "Arsenal of Democracy" for its wartime industry; Fort Wayne was the largest motor vehicle and parts depot in the world.
- 1943 A riot broke out, pitting whites against blacks during wartime.
- 1950 Detroit was the 4th largest city in the U.S., with 1.8 million people.
- 1957 The five-mile-long Mackinac Bridge opened on November 1.
- 1959 Motown began recording music in Detroit.
- 1960 Census results revealed a 1.45 million increase in state population, the largest in state history.
- 1967 Race riots struck the city of Detroit. After five days of rioting, 43 people were dead, 1,189 injured and over 7,000 arrested. The riot had lasting effects on the entire metro region and is usually cited as one of the reasons the Detroit area is among the most segregated areas in the United States.
- 1974 Gerald R. Ford of Grand Rapids became the 38th President of the United States.
- 1987 Michigan celebrated 150 years of statehood.
- 2001 The emigration rate for Michigan began to exceed the immigration rate.
- 2002 Michigan elected its first female governor, Democrat Jennifer Granholm.
- 2009 Michigan had the worst unemployment rate of any state, peaking at over 15%, due to the Automotive industry crisis of 2008–2010 and the Great Recession.
- 2010 Michigan lost 0.6% of its population since the previous census, the first decline in its population recorded by the United States Census Bureau.

== See also ==
- Timeline of Detroit
- List of Michigan state legislatures
- Timeline of the Toledo Strip/War
- Michigan History magazine

== References and further reading ==
- Dunbar, Willis F. and George S. May (1995). Michigan: A History of the Wolverine State. WM. B. Eerdmans. ISBN 0-8028-7055-4.
- Poremba, David Lee (2003). Detroit: A Motor City History. Arcadia Publishing. ISBN 0-7385-2435-2.
- Poremba, David Lee (2001). Detroit in Its World Setting (timeline). Wayne State University. ISBN 0-8143-2870-9.
- Woodford, Arthur M. (2001). This is Detroit 1701–2001. Wayne State University Press. ISBN 0-8143-2914-4.
