= Focus: HOPE =

American nonprofit organization

Focus: HOPE is a Detroit-based, non-denominational, non-profit organization whose aim is to overcome racism and poverty by providing education and training for underrepresented minorities and others. The organization is a public foundation under section 501(c)(3) of the Internal Revenue code.

== Founders and origins ==
Focus: HOPE was established in Detroit, Michigan, in March, 1968 by co-founders Father William T. Cunningham, Father Jerome Fraser and Eleanor Josaitis. At the time the social environment in northern Detroit was one of severe racial tension as a result of the 12th Street Riot of the previous summer. The co-founders' objective was to create a harmonious community where diverse people live and work together. Starting out in the basement of the Catholic Church of Madonna, where Father Cunningham was pastor, Focus: HOPE eventually grew to encompass a 40-acre (160,000 m^{2}) campus along Oakman Boulevard in Detroit. Despite its origins, however, Focus: HOPE has no affiliation with the Catholic Church.

Focus: HOPE's first significant action was a consumer survey on the disparity of food and prescription drug prices between inner-city Detroit and the surrounding suburbs. The survey was conducted in April, 1968 and was aimed at answering three questions:
• Do the poor pay more?
• Does skin color affect service?
• Are facilities and products equal for inner city and suburban shoppers?
The survey was designed with the help of local universities, government agencies and private firms. Focus: HOPE recruited 403 women from the city and surrounding suburbs to shop for a prescribed list of items at various chain and independent stores throughout the Detroit area. The findings of the survey were that people in poor, inner-city areas paid roughly 20% more for groceries and prescription drugs than people in the more affluent suburbs Furthermore, survey participants reported inferior quality and service in the inner-city stores. The consumer survey was instrumental in Focus: HOPE becoming the host agency for the Commodity Supplemental Food Program for the Detroit/Wayne County, MI region.

In 1972 Focus: HOPE formed a coalition opposing the relocation of the Automobile Association of America of Michigan's headquarters from the city of Detroit to Dearborn, a suburb of Detroit in which the black population was less than 0.02%. After an injunction against the move was denied Focus: HOPE filed a class action suit against AAA on behalf of its black employees alleging racial motivation for the move. The lawsuit, "Bell et al. vs. The Automobile Club of Michigan, et al." claimed that the relocation would force 200 black employees of AAA to leave their jobs due to the unavailability of public transportation to or affordable housing in the city of Dearborn. Shortly after the lawsuit was filed a federal judge ruled that Focus: HOPE had no standing in the case, since the organization itself had not suffered any damages. For the duration of the case, however, the majority of the financial support of the legal action against AAA was provided by Focus: HOPE. In February 1983 a settlement was reached between AAA and the plaintiffs for a substantial cash amount and a court-enforced affirmative action program to be implemented by AAA. The Housing and Transportation Trust fund was formed with part of the cash settlement for the purpose of providing low-interest mortgages and automobile loans for black employees of AAA, with Focus: HOPE appointed by the court as trustor. In the same timeframe a second lawsuit against AAA was also funded in large part by Focus: HOPE. "Greenspan, et al. vs. The Automobile Club of Michigan, et al.", was a gender discrimination class action fought on behalf of 7,000 female employees. The lawsuit branched off of the "Bell" case in 1974 and the trial concluded in December 1979. In February of the following year AAA was found guilty of discriminatory compensation and job-promotion practices.

Focus: HOPE's first major program was the Commodity Supplemental Food Program, a federal program to fight malnutrition in infants and young children. The co-founders revived the program in the early 1970s and led the effort to include low-income senior citizens. The Commodity Supplemental Food Program currently assists 500,000 people nationwide, with Focus: HOPE serving 42,000 in metropolitan Detroit – the program's largest component, with monthly distributions of food.

When Father Cunningham approached the owners of a closing machine tool plant, seeking to expand the parking lot for the Oakman Blvd. food distribution center, he observed that the plant's machinists were predominantly older, white males. Subsequent research showed that very few minorities or women were employed in the metalworking industry and that much of the workforce was nearing retirement age. The opportunity to create a means for helping area minorities trapped in welfare and low-paying jobs escape from poverty was clear and Focus: HOPE purchased the closing plant. Father Cunningham was able to convince the U.S. Department of Defense that the shortage in qualified machinists was cause for national security concerns. With the help of Sen. Carl Levin of Michigan, Focus: HOPE obtained loans of surplus machine tool equipment from the government along with a federal grant and donations from various private organizations and established the Machinist Training Institute (MTI) in 1981.

With industry layoffs hindering the job placement of some of the first MTI graduates, Father Cunningham and General Motors President James McDonald came to an agreement in which Focus: HOPE would be given a small production contract, enabling Focus: HOPE to hire the remaining graduates. Thus, F & H Metalcrafting was established. In the following years, Focus: HOPE acquired more industrial space along Oakman Blvd. through purchases and donations. Additional manufacturing operations were started as sources of revenue, to provide employment for single mothers and to foster minority business ownership. These manufacturing operations earned QS9000 certification and served the automotive companies as tier-one suppliers. The "Industry Mall", as the Oakman Blvd. industrial complex came to be known, included MTI, facilities for its manufacturing operations, medical and day-care centers and other industrial space for lease.

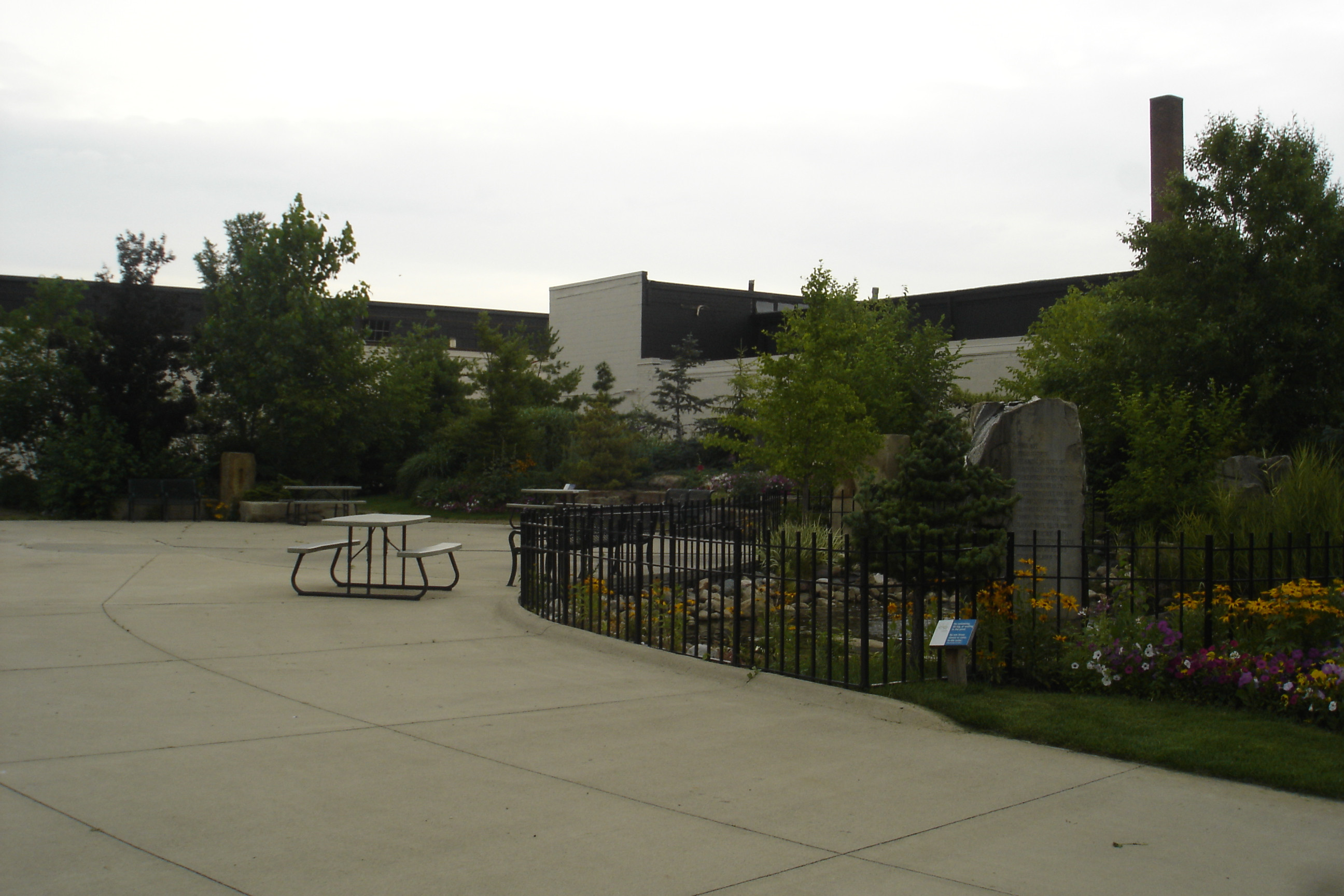
Focus: HOPE Park

On July 2, 1997, just weeks after the passing of Father Cunningham, a tornado caused severe damage to buildings on the Focus: HOPE campus and to several homes in the surrounding neighborhood. The wreckage of one building was cleared to make way for a park, dedicated to the memory of Father Cunningham and his vision of racial harmony. Focus: HOPE Park is tucked between two Oakman Blvd. buildings and is open to the public, with regular community gatherings hosted by Focus: HOPE.

Focus: HOPE's automotive parts manufacturing operations were phased out in 2005 due to the steady decline in production by the U.S. automotive industry.

Among Focus: HOPE's current operations are the Commodity Supplemental Food Program; technical training programs – Fast Track, The Machinist Training Institute (MTI), The Center for Advanced Technologies (CAT) and The Information Technologies Center (ITC) – collectively known as "The Centers for Opportunity"; a child-care center; a community arts program; and community and economic development activities. Focus: HOPE hosts the annual WALK for Diversity through varying Detroit neighborhoods. Inspired by the peaceful demonstrations of Martin Luther King Jr., the WALK for Diversity is an event that brings together people of different races and cultural backgrounds. Focus: HOPE is active in neighborhood improvement efforts such as blight removal, illegal dumping prevention and park restoration. Two recent community development efforts include the construction of a new housing facility for low-income seniors, in partnership with Presbyterian Villages of Michigan, and a new neighboring park.

The Focus: HOPE logo represents brotherhood and racial cooperation. It depicts two hands, one black and one white, reaching out for one another with the hope that one day they will touch. Through its endeavor, Focus: HOPE helps struggling families by providing resources that communities could not afford otherwise.

On November 3, 2008, William F. Jones Jr. was named chief executive officer of Focus: HOPE effective January 1, 2009. Jones recently retired as Chief Operating Officer of Chrysler Financial.

Recognizing the dignity and beauty of every person, we pledge intelligent and practical action to overcome racism, poverty and injustice. And to build a metropolitan community where all people may live in freedom, harmony, trust and affection. Black and white, yellow, brown and red from Detroit and its suburbs of every economic status, national origin and religious persuasion we join in this covenant.

— Focus Hope Mission Statement

== Commodity Supplemental Food Program ==
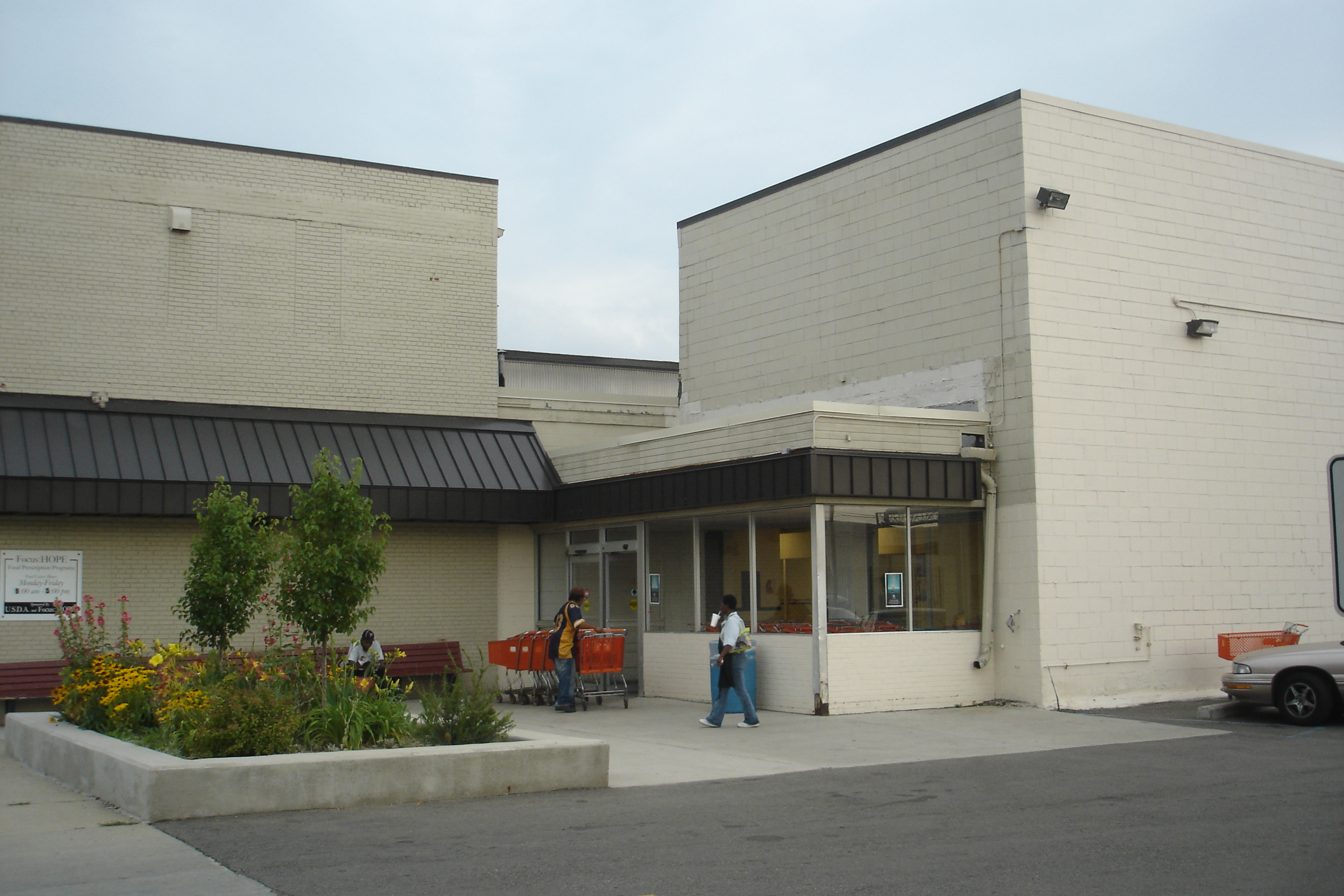
Focus: HOPE volunteers at work at the Oakman Blvd. food distribution center

In November, 1968, the U.S. Department of Agriculture, in accordance with Public Law 90-463, instituted the Commodity Supplemental Food Program (CSFP). The purpose of the program was to stave off the lifelong effects of early childhood malnutrition. The program also benefited farmers by providing an outlet for surplus food. Eligible participants of the program included pregnant and post-partum women, infants and children up to the age of six. Food items distributed through CSFP include infant formula; cereal; canned fruits, vegetables and juices; peanut butter; rice; pasta; dry beans and similar items.

Focus: HOPE became the host agency of the Commodity Supplemental Food Program for the Detroit area in 1971, classified by the USDA as a "community action or advocacy agency" with similar agencies administering the program in San Francisco, Louisville and Omaha. By 1980, Focus: HOPE had three distribution sites with 32,600 monthly participants, accounting for roughly 32% of the national caseload. By 1985, monthly participation had grown to over 60,000.

In January 1980 Focus: HOPE, along with The Children's Foundation, hosted the first ever Commodity and Supplemental Food Conference with the goal of strengthening Commodity Supplemental Food Programs and identifying and solving potential problems. A study published by The Children's Foundation the following year indicated that this program was effective in reducing the incidents of low birth rate and infant mortality and reducing the needs for lifelong medical care.

In the late seventies Focus: HOPE conducted a study, which was commissioned by the Detroit-Wayne County Agency on Aging, inquiring into the prevalence of malnutrition among senior citizens in the area. The findings of the study were that roughly 52,000 senior citizens in Wayne County, Michigan were nutritionally deprived. Following the study, Focus: HOPE proposed a one-year pilot program, to include 1,500 seniors in the Commodity Supplemental Food Program. A documentary film, entitled "Broken Promises", was produced by Focus: HOPE. Filmed over a four-month period on a $22,000 budget with a grant from the Detroit-Wayne County Agency on Aging, the film examined the plight of Detroit's hungry seniors. "Broken Promises" aired locally on WXYZ-TV in April, 1981. Later that year Congress narrowly passed the Agriculture and Food Act, Public Law 97-98, approving the participation of a limited number of eligible senior citizens in the CSFP in pilot programs in Detroit and Polk County, Iowa. The Farm Bill, signed into law by President Reagan in 1985, made the "Food for Seniors" program a permanent part of the Commodity Supplemental Food Program.

Focus: HOPE currently operates four food distribution centers, with supermarket-style checkout aisles, throughout the Detroit area. Qualified senior citizens are welcome at any of the food distribution centers and homebound seniors are eligible for deliveries of pre-assembled food packages. Forgotten Harvest, an independent non-profit, collects perishable foods from grocery stores and distributes them to various food centers, including Focus: HOPE. Consequently, food recipients occasionally receive perishable items such as bread, fresh fruit and condiments. In addition, free medical services, such as eye exams and flu shots, are occasionally provided to program participants at the food distribution centers.

== Education and training programs ==
=== Machinist Training Institute (MTI) ===
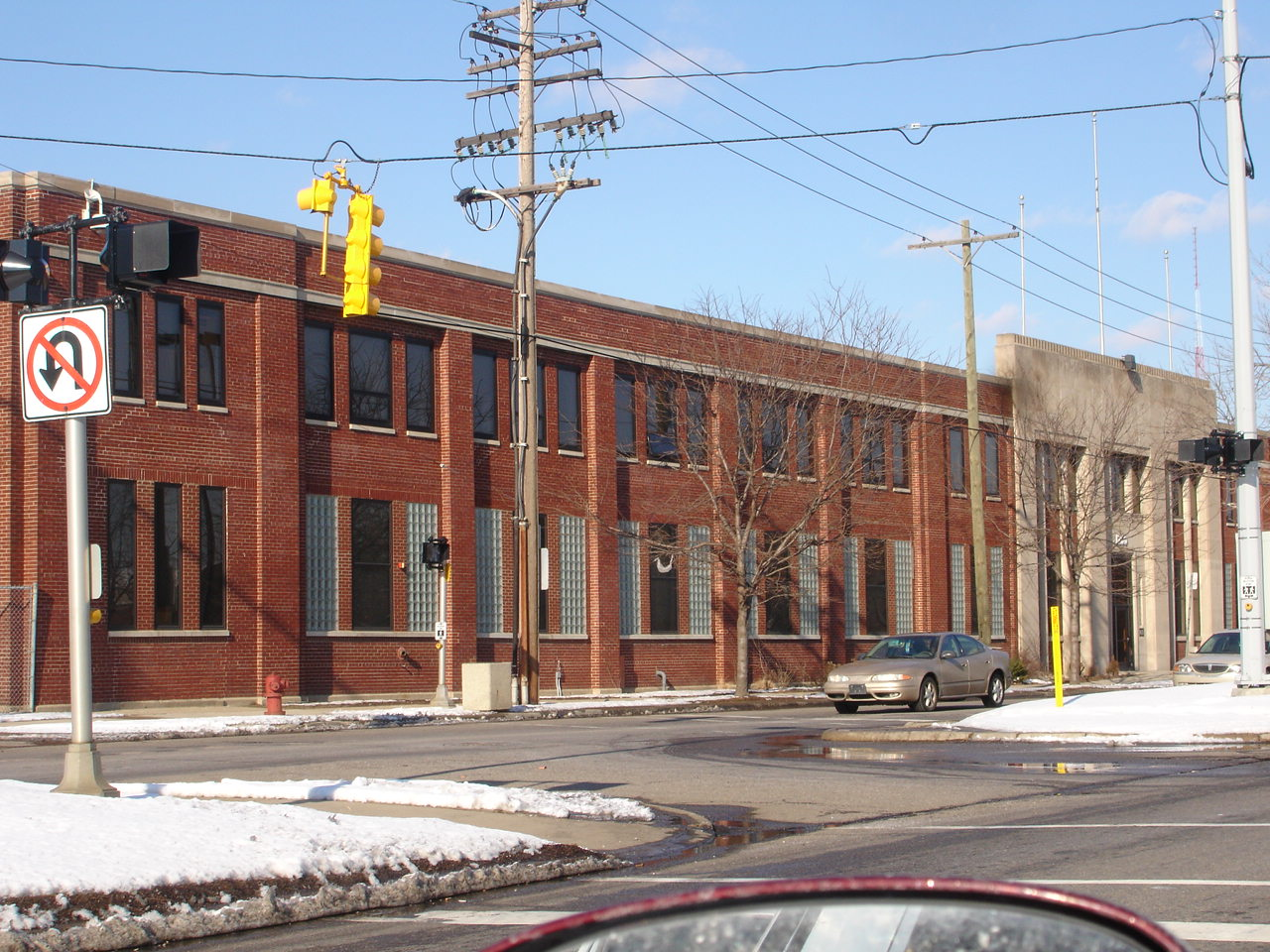
Focus: HOPE, Machinist Training Institute

The Machinist Training Institute (MTI) was established in 1981 and is located at 1360 Oakman Boulevard, the site of a former Ex-Cell-O plant that was used for automotive and farm implement production. As the Ex-Cell-O company was ceasing production at the Oakman Blvd. plant and preparing to permanently close it, Focus: HOPE leadership approached the plant's management in hopes of obtaining additional parking space for the neighboring food distribution center. While touring the facility Father Cunningham observed that the machinists employed there were mainly older, white men. Focus: HOPE immediately conducted a study and found that almost no minorities or women were employed as machinists and, moreover, American manufacturers, as a whole, suffered a shortage of 200,000 skilled machinists with the average journeyman's age being 58. No training facility for machinist had existed in the region since the Henry Ford Trade School closed decades earlier and shop owners had been reluctant to train new apprentices for fear that they may leave for higher wages. With these facts, Father Cunningham convinced the U.S. Department of Defense that the nationwide shortage of skilled machinists represented a national security concern, arguing that in the event of a war, the armed forces would be faced with a shortage of replacement parts. Focus: HOPE bought the 300,000-square-foot (28,000 m^{2}) Ex-Cell-O plant for a nominal price and obtained a federal grant along with a number of corporate donations for equipment and building refurbishment. With the help of Sen. Carl Levin, Focus: HOPE obtained a loan from the U.S. Department of Defense of $3 million worth of machine tool equipment that had been in storage.

Focus: HOPE began screening the first applicants to the Machinist Training Institute in July, 1981. Instruction began in November that same year after the first class of 60 students was accepted from a pool of 4000 applicants. Student tuition was funded through the Comprehensive Employment and Training Act (CETA). Beginning in 1982, tuition funding was also provided through the Job Training Partnership Act (JTPA). MTI graduated its first class of machinists on August 24, 1982. Shortly thereafter, Focus: HOPE entered into an agreement with General Motors to accept production contracts, allowing Focus: HOPE to employ some of its own MTI graduates, as well as give real-production experience to its trainees. The Machinist Training Institute gained accreditation through from the Council for Noncollegiate Continuing Education in 1986. That same year, CNC training was added to the MTI curriculum. By the end of the decade, Focus: HOPE had graduated roughly 800 students from The Machinist Training Institute with a job-placement average of 95%. In 1994, through the assistance of Sen. Levin, an avid supporter of Focus: HOPE's training programs, the Institute received a donation of 16 new lathes and had achieved 100% job placement of MTI graduates.

The MTI program is modeled after a similar program in St. Louis, a program that had a job-placement rate of 90% [26]. Students are taught shop-theory, math, blueprint reading, and quality inspection and receive more than 600 hours of hands-on machine tool setup and operation training. Training takes place eight hours per day, five days per week. The training program is divided into three tiers:
1. A 5-week "vestibule" program - focuses on communication and technical skills
2. A 26-week basic machining program
3. A 26-week advanced machining program (select participants only) – prepares students for the Center for Advanced Technologies (CAT) engineering programs
The requirements for entry into the Machinist Training Institute are a high school diploma or GED with ninth grade reading and tenth grade mathematics skill levels. MTI is a member of the Michigan Job Training Coordinating Council and the Michigan association of Vocation Private Schools (MSVP).

The Machinist Training Institute represents a bold new direction in the mission of Focus: HOPE, a direction in which the founders turned the organization's attention toward providing opportunities for economic inclusion to minorities as the chief means of fighting racism and injustice. It is the first and essentially the core of Focus: HOPE's education and training programs. More than 2,385 people have graduated from MTI. The program broke the race and gender barriers in the machinist trades in the 1980s.

=== Fast Track ===
Focus: HOPE launched the Fast Track program in 1989 to address the difficulty in recruiting qualified candidates for enrollment in the Machinist Training Institute. The administrators were finding that, although enough applicants possessed the requisite high school diploma or GED, many lacked the mathematics or communication skills necessary for success in the MTI program.

Fast Track is a seven-week, computer-based training program designed to raise the reading, writing and math skills to the necessary levels for admission into MTI or the Information Technologies Center (ITC). In addition to those key areas, students are rated on certain employability attributes including attendance, cooperativeness, interpersonal skills and work performance. Upon completion of the program, students typically demonstrate an increase in skills by two grade levels. In many cases, the skill-enhancement received in the FAST TRACK program improves graduates' job hunting success. Traditionally reserved for Focus: HOPE students, Fast Track is being opened up to others in new partnerships with community colleges and businesses.

The "First Step" program was introduced in 1997 to augment Fast Track. The purpose of First Step is to prepare students needing even further remedial development in basic skills for entrance into Fast Track. Applicants with sixth-grade math and eighth-grade reading skills are eligible for the four-week program.

=== Center for Advanced Technologies (CAT) ===
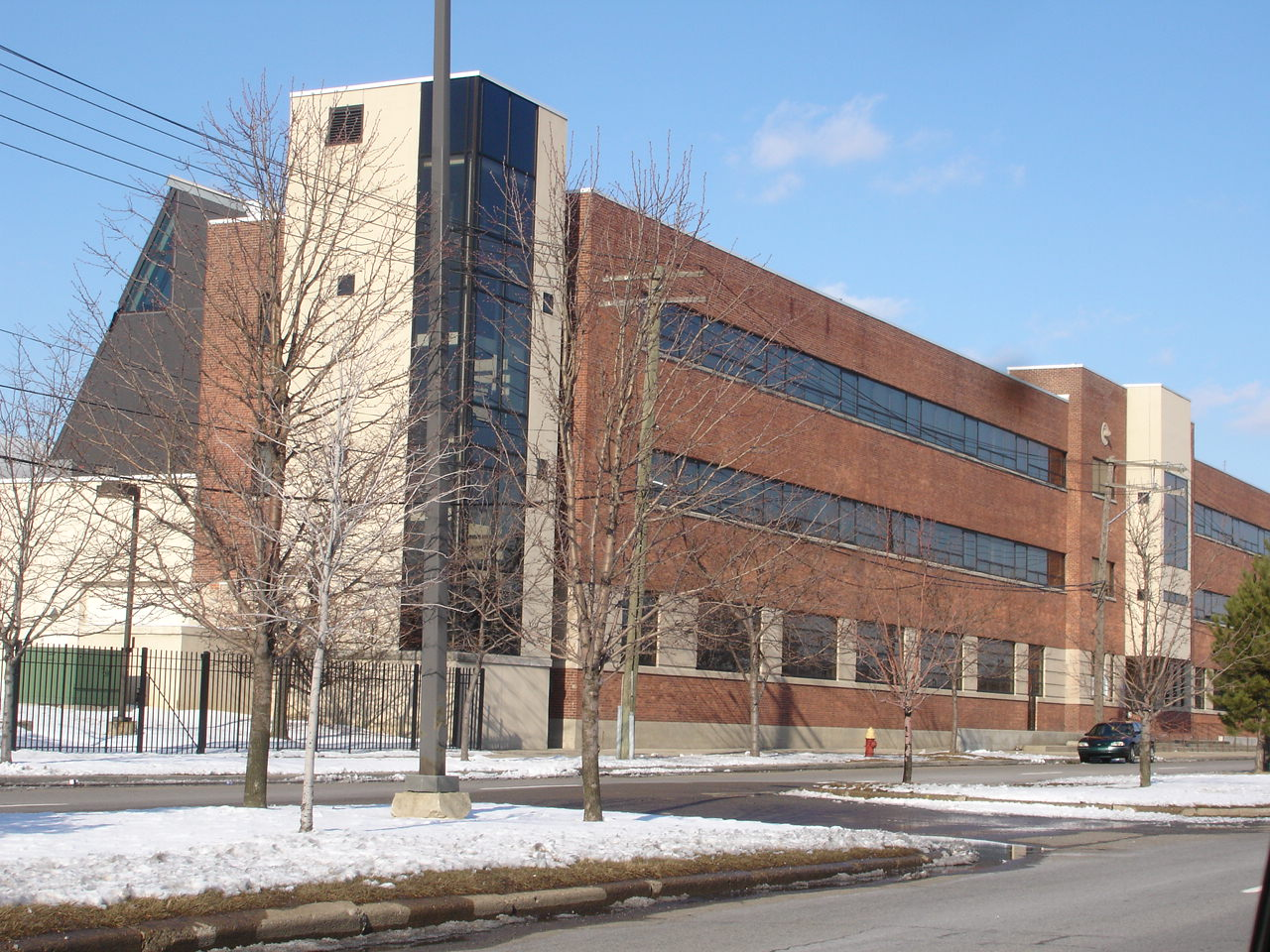
Focus: HOPE, Center For Advanced Technologies

The Center for Advanced Technologies (CAT) was created in 1989 through a memorandum of understanding between the Department of Defense, Commerce, Education and Labor. It was developed and operated by Focus: HOPE to enhance the competitiveness of the U.S. industry and to allow interested MTI students to continue their manufacturing education. The CAT program offers associates and bachelor's degrees in manufacturing engineering in partnership with Lawrence Technological University, Wayne State University, and University of Detroit Mercy. The CAT program teaches contemporary manufacturing, while studying related academics. Courses are taught on-site by faculty from partner universities. In addition, some students take classes on the campuses of area universities.

Focus: HOPE contracts with government and business to provide real-world work experience and hands on engineering experience for its students while pursuing academic degrees. The CAT currently holds a contract with the US Army. In conjunction with the US Army's National Automotive Center (NAC), the CAT developed the Mobile Parts Hospital (MPH). The MPH is capable of producing a variety of critically needed replacement parts for the military vehicles on site. The MPH unit sends a request for manufacturing data to the Command and Control Center, located in the CAT building at Focus: HOPE, which then transmits the data back to the field where the part is manufactured for immediate use.

=== The Information Technologies Center (ITC) ===
Focus: HOPE started the Information Technologies Center (ITC) in 1999, to provide industry-certified training. It is a part-time program, either 28 or 55 weeks long, open to everyone in Detroit. The ITC trains students for entry-level positions in the Information Technology (IT) industry based on a curriculum developed by IT leaders such as Microsoft, Novell and Cisco. The ITC program offers training in three IT career paths: Cisco Certified Network Associate (CCNA), Microsoft Certified Application Specialist (MCAS) in Office 2007 and Windows Vista for Business Worker, and Microsoft Certified Technical Specialist (MCTS). In partnership with Wayne State University, the ITC now gives students who graduate the program the opportunity to continue their education and earn a college degree in Information Management and Systems Engineering.

== Focus: HOPE Community Arts and Development ==
=== Focus on the Mission ===
Focus on the Mission is a Focus: HOPE community arts program that mixes inner-city and suburban teenagers. The goal is to help students develop knowledge and respect for different cultures and races while introducing them to new experiences. Students are grouped into culturally diverse teams, which are mentored by a professional photographer and an art educator. Students are taken on field trips which include tours of various cultural and historical sites in Detroit. Each student uses digital and 35mm cameras to take black-and-white photos during field trips. The field trips and photo assignments enable teens to explore the cultural, geographical and social boundaries of Detroit. At the end of the program, each student is challenged to pick one photo which they believe is a representation of themes taken from the Focus: HOPE mission statement, including dignity, community, beauty, freedom and hope. These photos are then put on display in the Focus: HOPE Gallery, located on the second floor of the Focus: HOPE Center for Advanced Technologies, where they are available for public viewing.

=== The Center For Children (CFC) ===
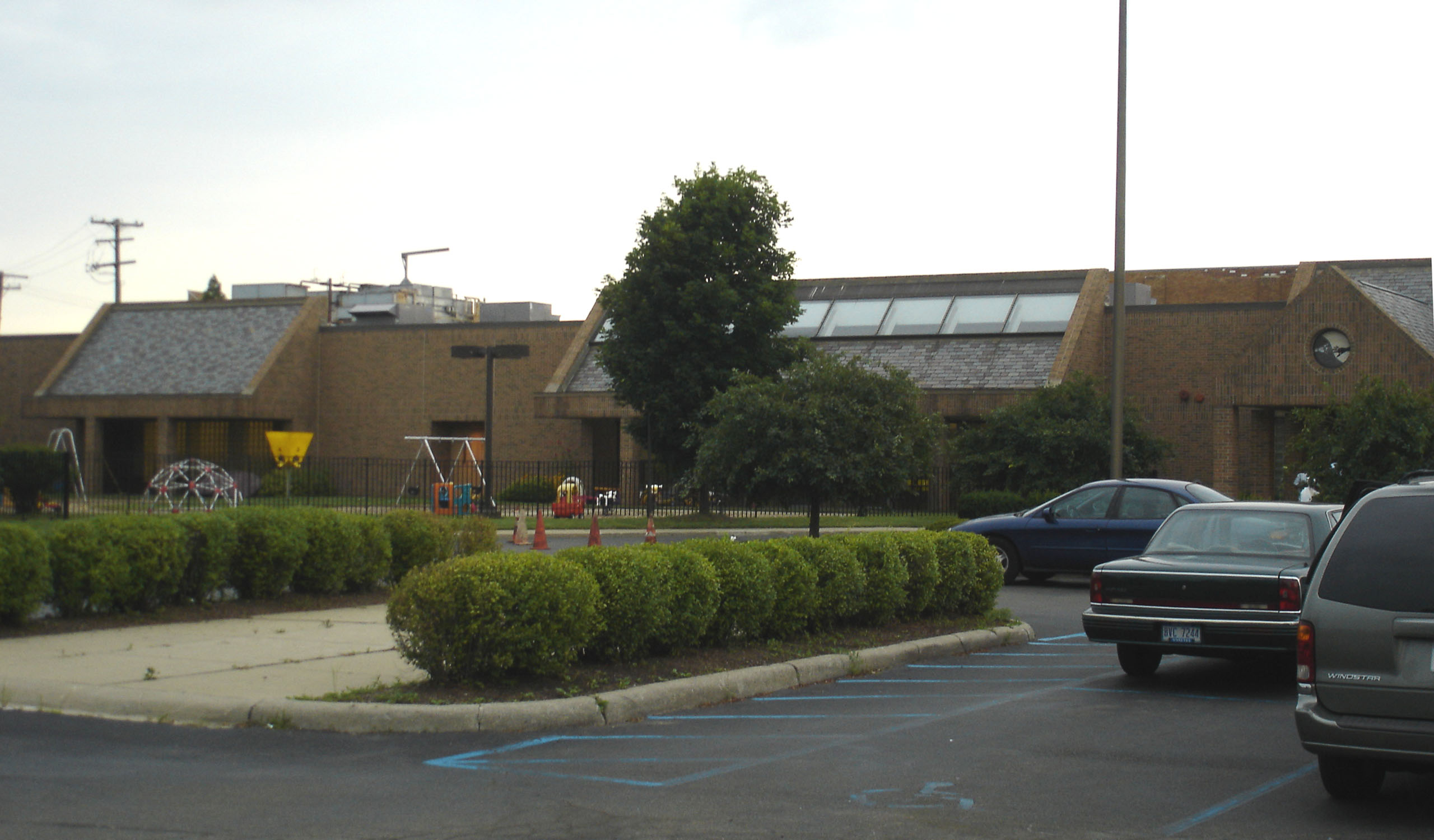
The Focus: HOPE Center for Children

Started in 1987, the Focus HOPE Center for Children provides infant and toddler care, also Montessori and early childhood preschool education (age three through kindergarten) and after-school programs for children up to age twelve. The CFC's approach is to stress the needs and basic development of the children socially and intellectually, by enhancing self-confidence and independence with love and respect.

=== WALK for Diversity ===
The annual WALK for Diversity is an event with the purpose of bringing together people who are committed to Focus: HOPE's civil rights mission. The WALK brings together thousands of people of all races and cultures every year from Detroit city and its suburbs. Money raised through the walk, from sponsors and donations, goes toward scholarships for students in all of Focus: HOPE's education programs. The WALK route is chosen to emphasize Detroit's historic neighborhoods, and cultural differences. The WALK celebrates the success and impact Focus: HOPE has had on the community.

=== Senior housing ===
The Village of Oakman Manor is a 4-story, 54-unit apartment housing complex for senior citizens. It is located within blocks of the Focus: HOPE campus. The complex was built with a goal of bringing in new development to the area as well as helping out its elderly community. The Village of Oakman Manor was opened to residents in January 2007. Qualified prospective residents are low-, fixed-income seniors and rent is based on each resident's adjusted monthly gross income, generally ranging from $0–$600 a month. The complex is part of Michigan's Cool Cities Initiative, a state-sponsored movement to revitalize Michigan's cities. Focus: HOPE was awarded a catalyst grant from the program to help fund the housing project. Other housing, as well as a new park, is expected to be developed in the area as part of the Cool Cities "Neighborhood in Progress" program.
