= Eleanor Josaitis =

American civil rights activist

Eleanor Mary Josaitis (née Reed; December 17, 1931 – August 9, 2011) was an American civil rights activist and the co-founder of Focus: HOPE, an organization fighting racism and poverty. Michigan governor Rick Snyder referred to her as a "tireless and devoted leader".

== Work ==
Having become involved in civil rights after hearing about the violence directed towards civil rights activists in Alabama, Josaitis co-founded Focus: HOPE a year after the 1967 Detroit riot and served as its associate director for many years. Upon the executive director Fr William Cunningham's death in 1997, she succeeded him and later became the CEO.

She also provided leadership and advocacy for the Commodity Supplemental Food Program and made important contributions to public awareness of hunger and malnutrition. Working with co-founder Cunningham, she helped develop Centers of Opportunity education and training programs to help primarily underrepresented minorities gain access to jobs and careers. She served on numerous board and committees, including The National Workforce Alliance Board, the Michigan Council for Labor and Economic Growth, and the advisory board for the Arab-American and Chaldean Council. In 2002 she was named one of the most influential women in Detroit by Crain's Detroit Business.

In 2006, she turned over the day-to-day operation to a new leadership team in order to focus her efforts on fundraising. She died of peritoneal cancer on August 9, 2011, in Livonia, Michigan.

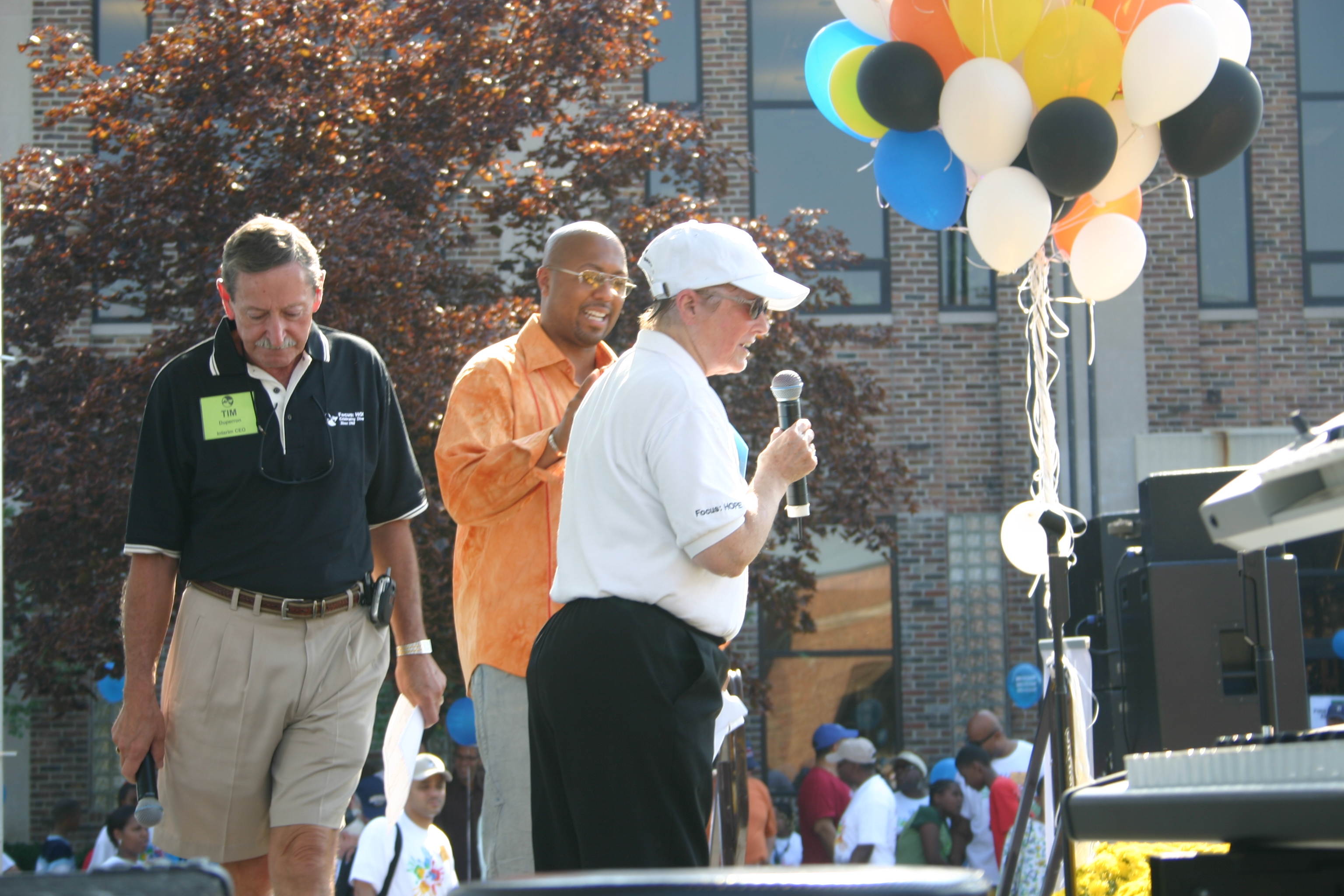
Eleanor Josaitis at a Focus: HOPE event.

== Legacy ==
Josaitis was widely known and respected throughout Metro Detroit for her work in the community, and had been referred to as "Detroit's Mother Theresa" before her death. U.S. Senator Carl Levin gave the eulogy at her funeral mass, quoting her exhortation to "Recognize the dignity and beauty of every person, and take practical action to overcome racism, poverty and injustice." She was inducted into the Michigan Women's Hall of Fame in 1998.

In her memory, the Detroit Free Press and Detroit Metropolitan Affairs Coalition annually present the Eleanor Josaitis Unsung Hero Award, which "recognizes an individual who may not have yet received the widespread recognition she or he deserves for long-standing efforts to further regional cooperation and understanding."

== Awards ==
- 1999 “Distinguished Warrior” by the Detroit Urban League
- Anti-Defamation League's Women of Achievement Award
- Arab American Institute Foundation's Khalil Gibran Spirit of Humanity Award
- Assumption University's Christian Culture Series Gold Medal Award
- Boy Scouts of America's Good Scout Award
- City Year Detroit Lifetime of Idealism Award
- Clara Barton Ambassador Award
- Detroit NAACP Presidential Award
- Education Award from Society of Automotive Engineers
- Ford Employees African-Ancestry Network's 2002 Heritage Award
- Jeffery W. Barry Award for Educational Excellence and Service from Walsh College
- Marygrove College's Theresa Maxis Award
- National Council of Negro Women's Achiever Award
- Peacemaker Award from Wayne State University's Center for Peace and Conflict Studies
- The Detroit News Michiganian of the Year
- The National Council of Women of the United States Inc.'s Woman of Conscience Award
- University of Michigan School of Business Administration Leadership Award
- Wade McCree Award from the Federal Bar Association
- Woman of the Year by YWCA of Western Wayne County
- Wonder Woman Award by the Women's Survival Center of Oakland County
- National Caring Award from the Caring Institute in Washington D.C.
