= Griswold Street =

Street in Detroit, Michigan

Coordinates: 42.33027°N 83.04707°W

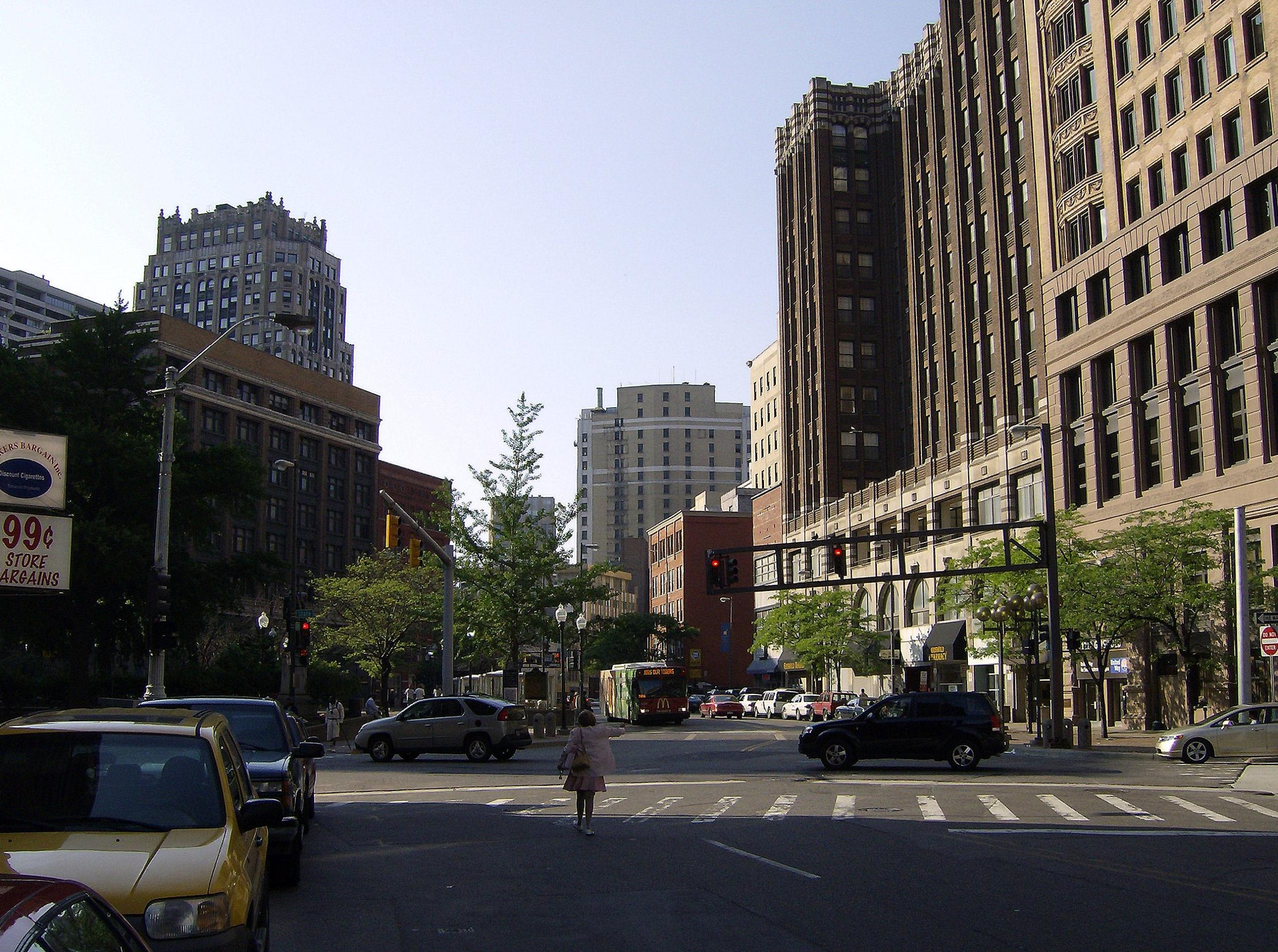
- Griswold Street looking north from State Street, with the former DDOT downtown layover area and Industrial-Stevens Apartments visible to the left.
- Interactive map of Griswold Street
- Length: 0.5 mi (0.80 km)
- South end: M-10 in Detroit
- Major junctions: M-85 in Detroit
- North end: Clifford Street in Detroit

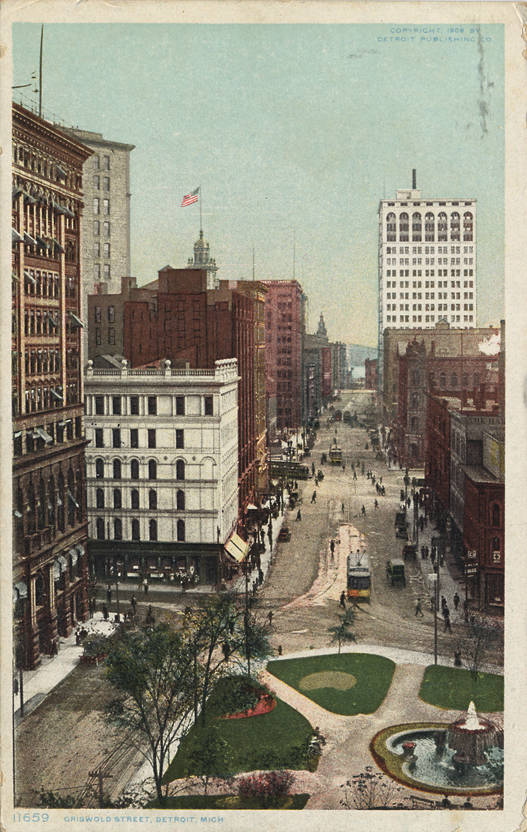
Griswold Street, c. 1900s

Griswold Street is a major north-south street in downtown Detroit, which passes through the city's Financial District lined with many of its most familiar and recognizable structures, such as the Guardian Building and One Woodward Avenue. Griswold Street also passes through the Capitol Park Historic District.

== Tour of the buildings ==
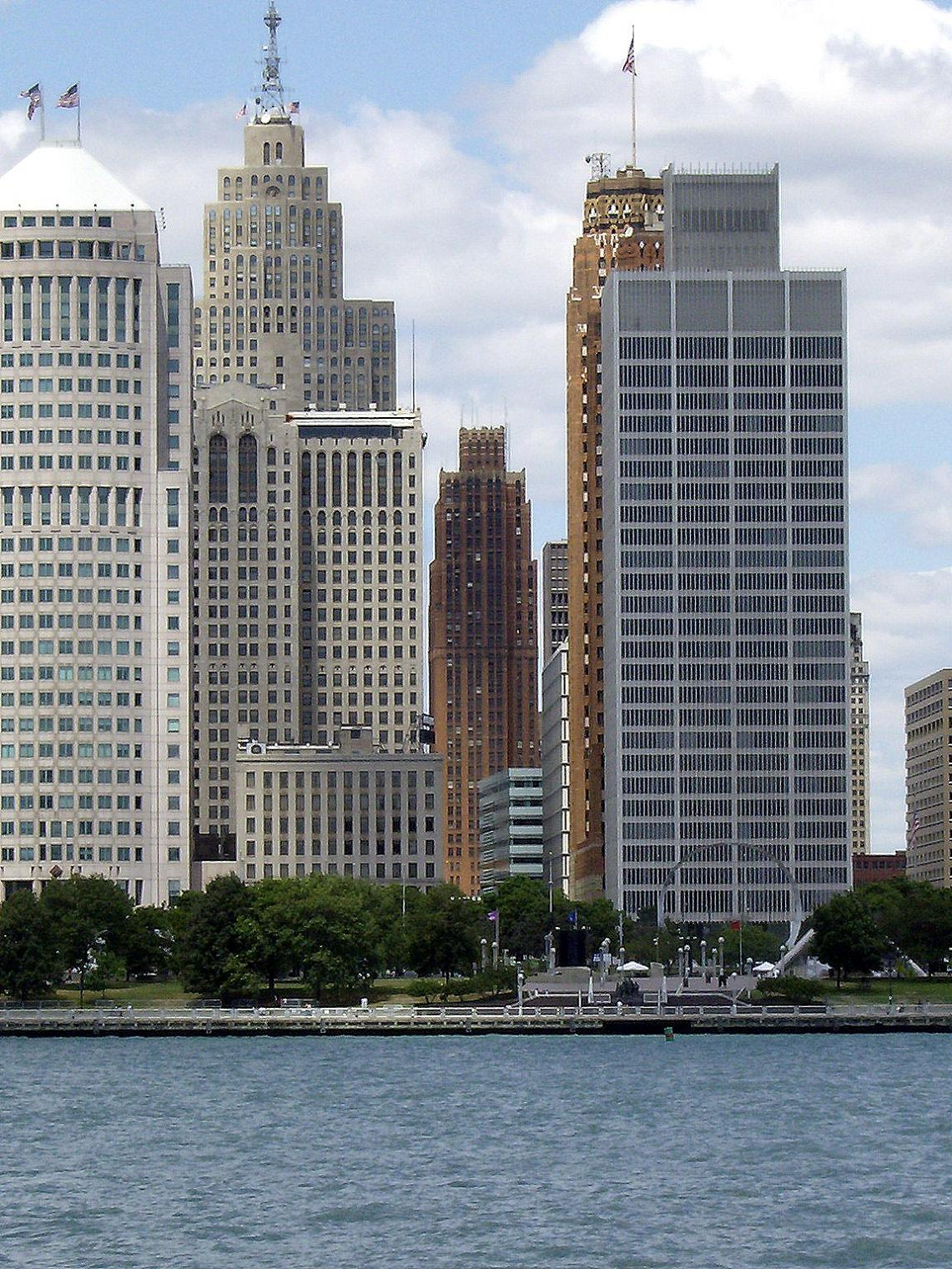
The Detroit Financial District followed by the David Stott Building standing proudly in the distance, along Griswold Street. This view was taken from across the International Riverfront, in Dieppe Gardens in Windsor, Ontario.

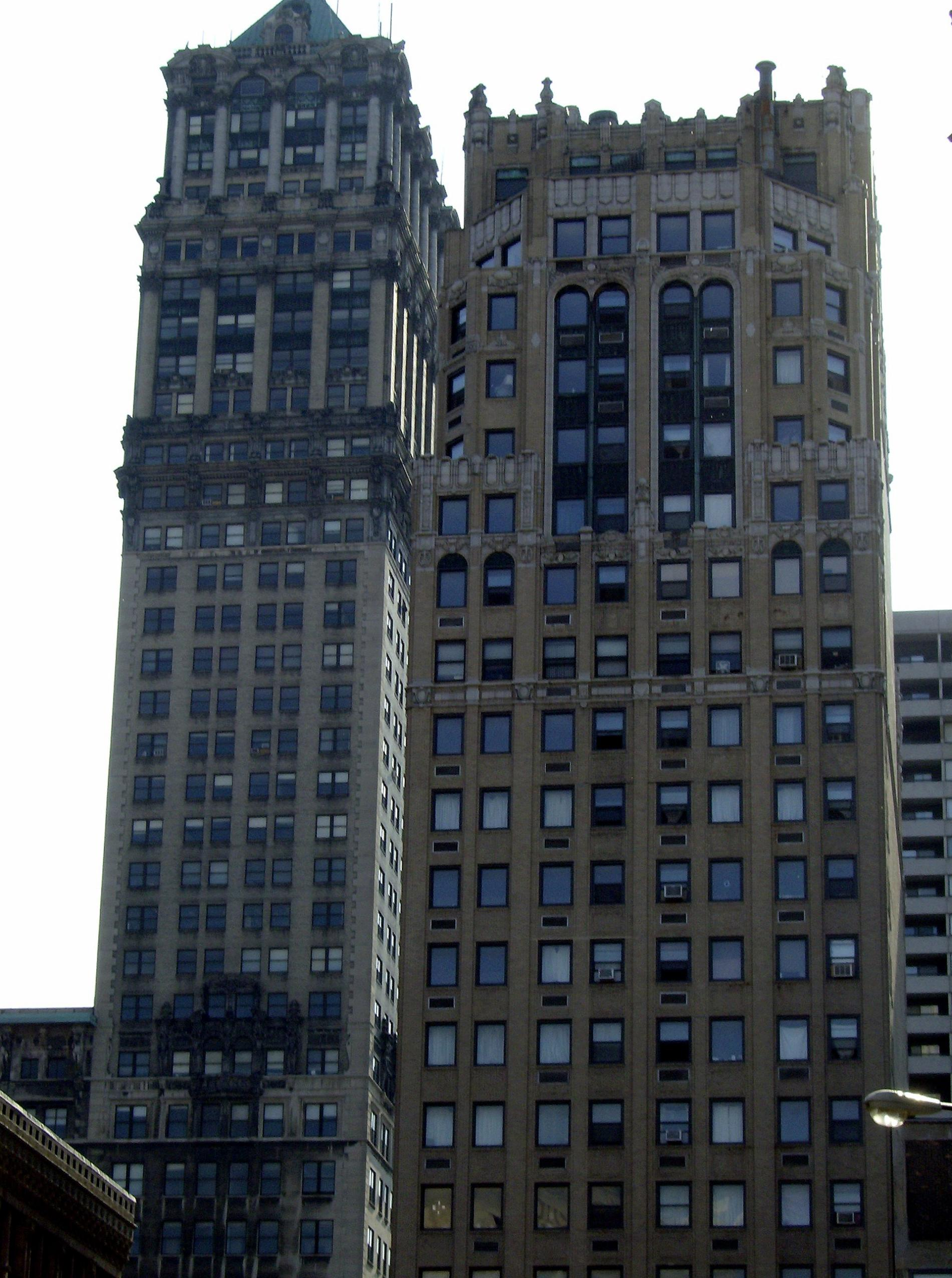
Book Tower (left) and Industrial-Stevens Apartments both by Louis Kamper.

This list below shows the information on the buildings located along Griswold Street. This list starts at Jefferson Avenue (south end), and heads northbound, terminating at Clifford Street.

Address	Building name		Building use	Year built	Architectural Style	Floors	Notes
Address	West side of street	East side of street	Building use	Year built	Architectural Style	Floors	Notes
Detroit River/Hart Plaza
West Jefferson Avenue
1 Griswold Street	One Griswold Street		Church(Church of Scientology)	1927	neo-classical	9	Stands next to 150 West Jefferson Avenue
150 West Jefferson Avenue	150 West Jefferson		office building	1989	postmodern	28	Stands on the site of the former Detroit Stock Exchange
1 Woodward Avenue		One Woodward Avenue	office building	1962	Modern architecture	26	built by Minoru Yamasaki Associates, designers of the now-destroyed World Trade Center in New York City.
West Larned Street
500 Griswold Street		Guardian Building	office building	1929	Art Deco	40	Known as the "Cathedral of Finance"
525 Griswold Street	Griswold-Larned Parking Garage		Parking garage	1968	modern architecture	9	
535 Griswold Street	Buhl Building		office building	1925	Neo-Gothic and Romanesque	25	
West Congress Street
615 Griswold Street	Ford Building		Office building	1909	Neo-classical and neo-Renaissance	21	
645 Griswold Street	Penobscot Building		office building, conference center	1928	Art deco	47	Once the tallest building outside of New York City and Chicago
611 Woodward Avenue		Chase Tower	office building, bank	1959	modern architecture	14	Stands at the location of Detroit's first skyscraper, the Hammond Building
West Fort Street
719 Griswold Street	Dime Building		Office building	1923	Neo-classical	23	
777 Woodward Avenue		One Kennedy Square	Office building	2006	modern architecture	10	Detroit's newest high-rise building
West Lafayette Street
751 Griswold Street	The Olde Building		lofts, restaurant	1927	neo-classical architecture	4	designed by Albert Kahn and Corrado Parducci
144 West Lafayette	Lafayette Building		office building	1923	neo-classical architecture	14	demolished 2010
Michigan Avenue
150 Griswold Street	The Griswold ~ Capitol Park		parking garage with ground floor retail	2008	modern	10	Roxbury Group bought the air rights above the garage in 2007 to construct 80 condos atop the structure, but plans were halted for the condo portion in January 2008 due to a weak economy.
1001 Woodward Avenue		1001 Woodward Avenue	mixed-use	1965	International	25	
1150 Griswold Street		David Stott Building	office building	1929	Art Deco	38	
State Street
1212 Griswold Street		United Way Community Services Building	Charity, offices	1895	Neo-classical	12	United Way for Southeast Michigan moved into the building as its main tenant in 1987
1214 Griswold Street		Griswold Building Senior Apartments	Apartment building (seniors' residence)	1929	Art moderne	12	Formerly an office building
Unknown address	Capitol Park		Park	Unknown	Unknown	1	
Grand River Avenue
1457 Griswold Street		Isaac Agree Downtown Synagogue	Synagogue			4	Last congregation-owned synagogue building in Detroit.
Clifford Street

== See also ==
- Detroit Financial District
