= Hammond Building =

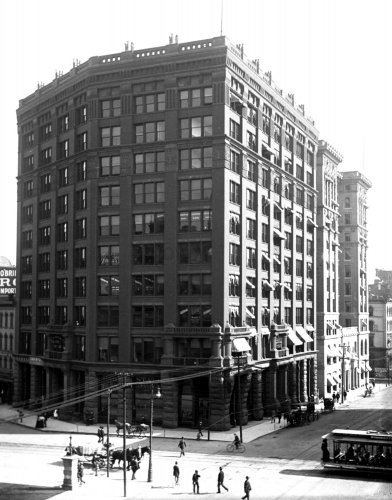
- c.1900
- Interactive map of the Hammond Building area

General information
- Status: Demolished
- Type: Commercial offices
- Location: 632-656 Griswold Street; Detroit, Michigan
- Coordinates: 42.3306°N 83.0471°W
- Completed: 1889
- Demolished: 1956

Height
- Roof: 45.72 m (150.0 ft)

Technical details
- Floor count: 10 plus excavated basement

Design and construction
- Architect: George H. Edbrooke

The Hammond Building was a high-rise building completed in 1889 at the southeast corner of Griswold Street and West Fort Street in the financial district of downtown Detroit, Michigan directly across Fort Street from the Detroit City Hall. The 46 m (151 ft) building was designed by George H. Edbrooke, and is considered the first skyscraper in the city, and was the tallest in the state when built. Russell Wheel & Foundry supplied and erected the iron and structural steel for the building. The Hammond Building was demolished in 1956 to make way for the National Bank of Detroit Building, which has since been renamed The Qube. At 12 stories, the steel-framed United Way Community Services Building (1895), originally the Chamber of Commerce Building, qualifies as Detroit's oldest existing skyscraper.

== History ==
=== George H. Hammond ===
Born in Massachusetts, George H. Hammond moved to Detroit in 1854 and opened a small meat market at the corner of Third and Howard streets. Hammond later bought a refrigerated boxcar patent from William Davis, a Detroit fish dealer. Davis' idea involved using horsehair to line the car. Next to the shell were sheet metal tanks for broken ice and salt. Hammond used Davis' boxcar to successfully move beef to market; the first trial run occurring in May 1869, moving beef from Detroit to Boston, Massachusetts using ice from the Detroit River

Hammond eventually established operations in Hammond, Indiana to manufacture the refrigerated cars. His operations, which were located near the stockyards in Chicago, included slaughtering and meat processing operations. He amassed a business that owned over 800 refrigerator cars and slaughtered 100,000 head of cattle annually. As the meat was processed, it was loaded into the refrigerated rail cars and shipped cross country to the east coast. Hammond died in 1886 leaving his fortune to his wife, Ellen Hammond. Ellen divested her interests in the meat packing business in 1888, receiving over $2 million at the time. Hammond had started making plans for his skyscraper in the early 1880s. After his death, Ellen purchased the property for $350,000 and commissioned the building which was completed in 1889.

=== Construction ===
On 14 March 1889, construction of the building began by Chicago builders, W.A. Wells and A.E. Wells, with the demolition of former buildings on the site and an excavation of the ground beneath. The former buildings on the site included the home of Detroit's first postmaster, James Abbott.

The building was built using iron beams and wooden joists which were protected by 2" hollow tiles. The exterior of the building consisted of red pressed face brick bonded with lime and cement mortar, common hard burned clay brick and rubble stone. The floors in the office areas were generally oak and corridor floors were marble with marble wainscoting up to a high of 4 feet. Construction of the building was at times halted due to an insufficient quantity of mules.

When Ellen Hammond hired architect and chief contractor, George H. Edbrooke, she retained 15% of the building fee to ensure quality of workmanship. Upon completion, it was determined that defective work was provided by the plasterers, steam fitters and carpenters and Edbrooke was not paid in full. Edbrooke then did not pay his subcontractors. Some of the contractors were owed substantial sums of money, such as A.L. Deane & Co, the vault supplier, was owed $8,217.

The matter was referred to the United States Court of Appeals. In 1894, Edbrooke committed suicide in his New York office, owing to business troubles.

=== Building usage ===
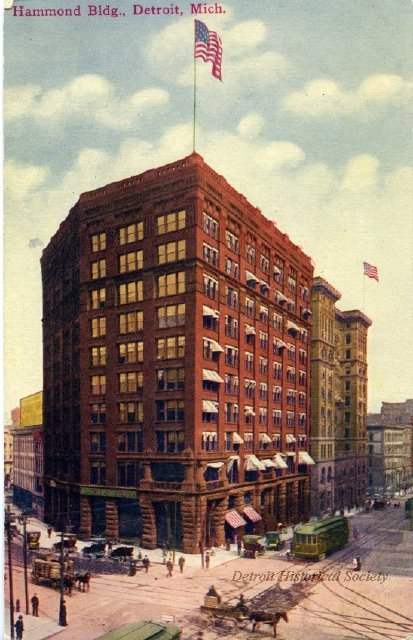
Postcard of the Hammond Building, c. 1915

In August 1890, the 246 offices of the building were illuminated for an entire week to honor the Detroit International Exposition. Edison incandescent lights and gas were utilized to light up the offices. During the day, the offices of the building were opened to allow visitors to tour the building. Throughout the life of the building incandescent lights had a usage sufficient for Westinghouse Electric & Manufacturing Company's Incandescent Lamp Division carried a stock in Detroit specifically for the Hammond Building.

The roof of the building was used to signal ships in the Detroit River to warn them of storm conditions on the Great Lakes.

In February 1906, a night watchman, William Urquhart, mistook an open elevator door as an open door in the darkness and fell down the elevator shaft from the first floor to the basement. He suffered broken limbs and internal injuries. The Detroit Free Press anticipated his demise as they reported the fall to be fatal.

Tenants varied over the years of operation. In 1911 the Dime Savings Bank was a tenant prior to construction of the Dime Building. In 1911, the United States Department of Agriculture occupied the building. Other tenants, were of a smaller nature, like J. A. Mercier a general contractor, who wrote to the Hammond Building Company to advise them that outside workmen may "invariably come to (his) office as there is no other place for them to go." He further advised, "if this custom does not agree with your views...I can find an office in some other office building where I can do my business as I see fit to do it"

=== Demolition ===
By 1944, the building was marginally profitable to operate. Several other, more modern high rise buildings had been built in Detroit. The Hammond Building was only netting $1.43 per square foot from rentals whereas the cost to operate the building was $1.20 per square foot.

The corporation which owned and managed the Hammond building, The Hammond Building Company was dissolved on 15 February 1956.

In 1956, the Hammond building was demolished to make room for the $20 million National Bank of Detroit (NBD) headquarters building. Construction on the new building, designed by Albert Kahn Associates, began in summer of 1957. NBD moved into its new headquarters in September 1959. The building is currently owned by Quicken Loans and referred to as The Qube.

== Notes ==
a: Other texts refer to Harry W. J. Edbrooke as the architect of record, however graduated in 1898 from the school of architecture which was after construction of the Hammond Building was complete.
