= Farwell Building =

- U.S. National Register of Historic Places
- U.S. Historic district – Contributing property
- Michigan State Historic Site
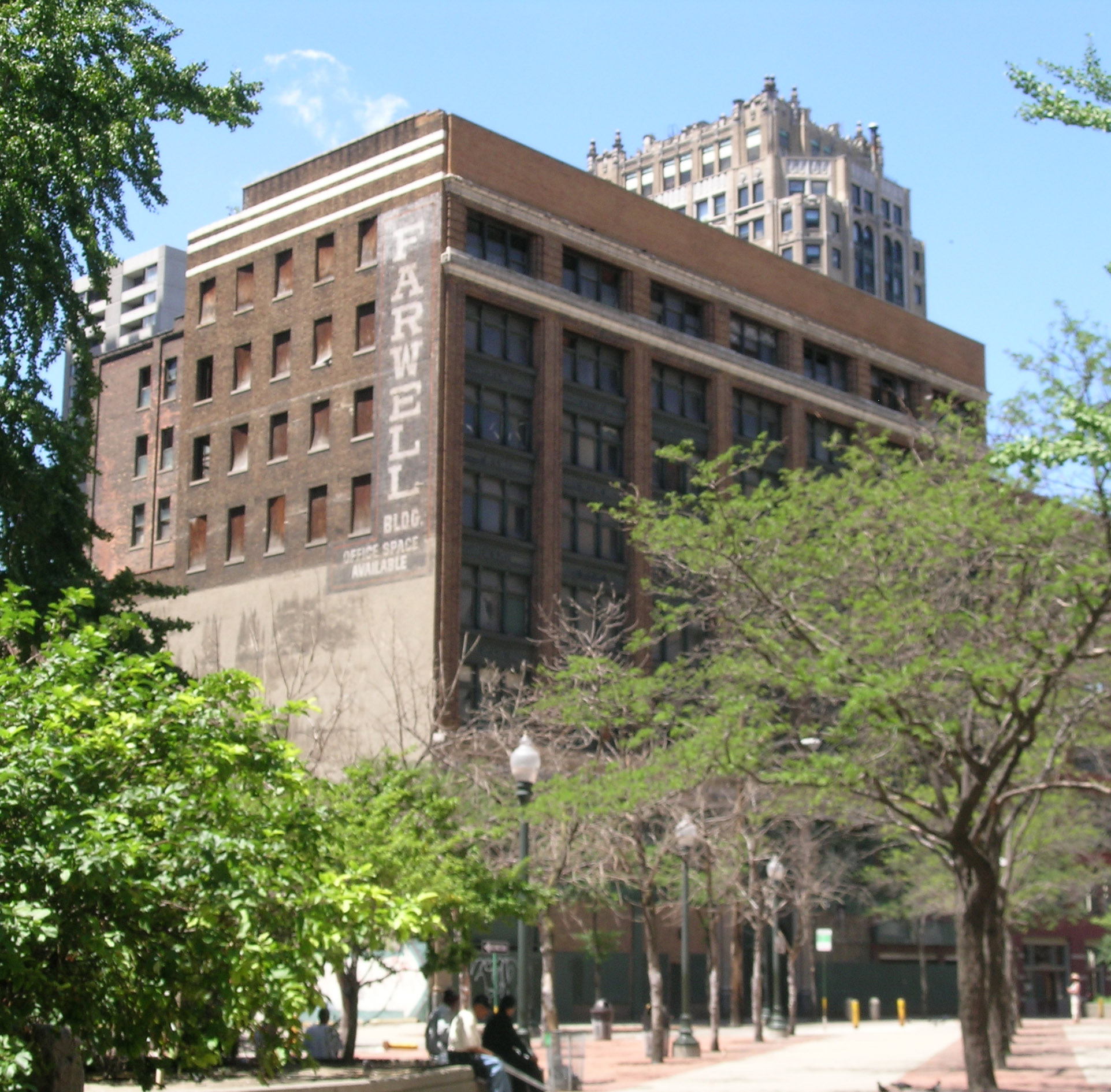
- Farwell Building, looking through Capitol Park
- Interactive map
- Location: 1249 Griswold Street; Detroit, Michigan
- Coordinates: 42°20′0″N 83°3′0″W
- Built: 1915
- Architect: Harrie W. Bonnah
- Architectural style: Chicago school
- Part of: Capitol Park Historic District (ID99000338)
- NRHP reference No.: 76001037

Significant dates
- Added to NRHP: April 30, 1976
- Designated MSHS: July 26, 1974

The Farwell Building is a commercial building and residential building located at 1249 Griswold Street in Downtown Detroit, Michigan. It was designated a Michigan State Historic Site in 1974, and listed on the National Register of Historic Places in 1976.

== Description ==
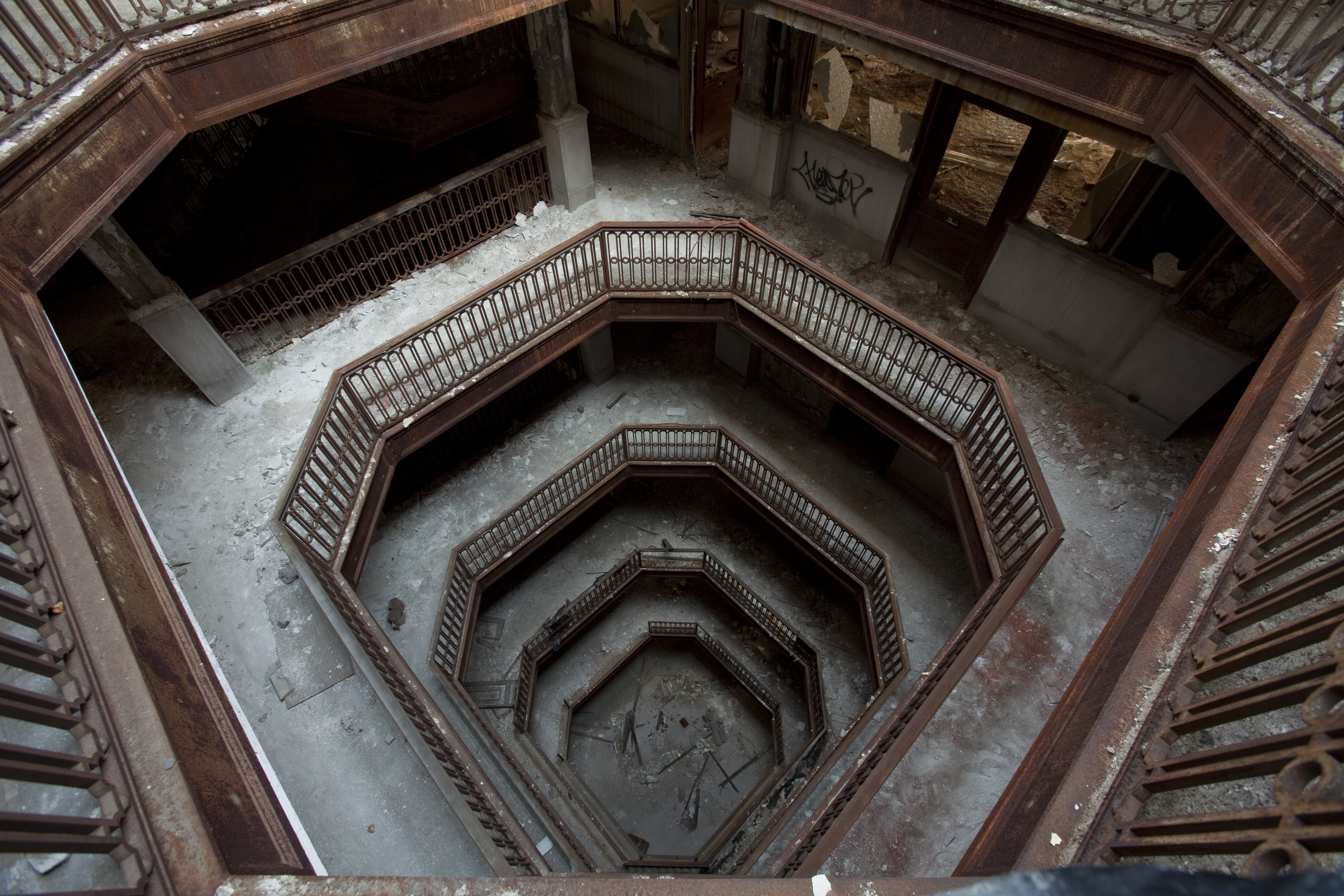
Building interior, looking down at the light court

The Farwell Building is an eight-story rectangular building built of brick, and designed in the Chicago school architectural style. The front façade makes extensive use of glass, and includes both horizontal and vertical elements. A horizontal frieze crosses the façade at the entrance level, and a second frieze decorated with triglyphs and metopes adorns the second story. Ionic pilasters stand at the corners of the building and flanking the central entrance. Iron grillwork decorates the entrance transom, and the interior features a Tiffany mosaic ceiling, brass elevator doors, and marble walls.

== History ==
The Farwell Building is named for the estate of Jesse H. and Emmer J. Farwell. The building was completed in 1915 from plans made by architect Harrie W. Bonnah. The decorative (and structural) ironwork was made by the Russell Wheel and Foundry Company of Detroit.

In 1956, the Farwell was significantly altered: the original terra cotta cornice with Pewabic tiles was removed, and significant changes were made to the ground level façade. Higgins Management Company purchased the Farwell during the 1970s and renovated the building for retail office space. The building became completely vacant in 1984.

In October 2009, the State of Michigan announced it was in negotiations to buy the building from the current owners through the federal Neighborhood Stabilization Program with a final sale price expected to be over US$3 million, less past-due property taxes owed on the building. In April 2012, Lansing-based Karp and Associates submitted a successful bid to restore the building and the nearby Detroit Savings Bank Building to house residential units, offices and retail space. Part of the renovations include recreating the cornice removed in 1957. The building reopened in 2019.

== See also ==
- Capitol Park
- Urban development in Detroit
