= The Qube =

Financial center in Michigan, US

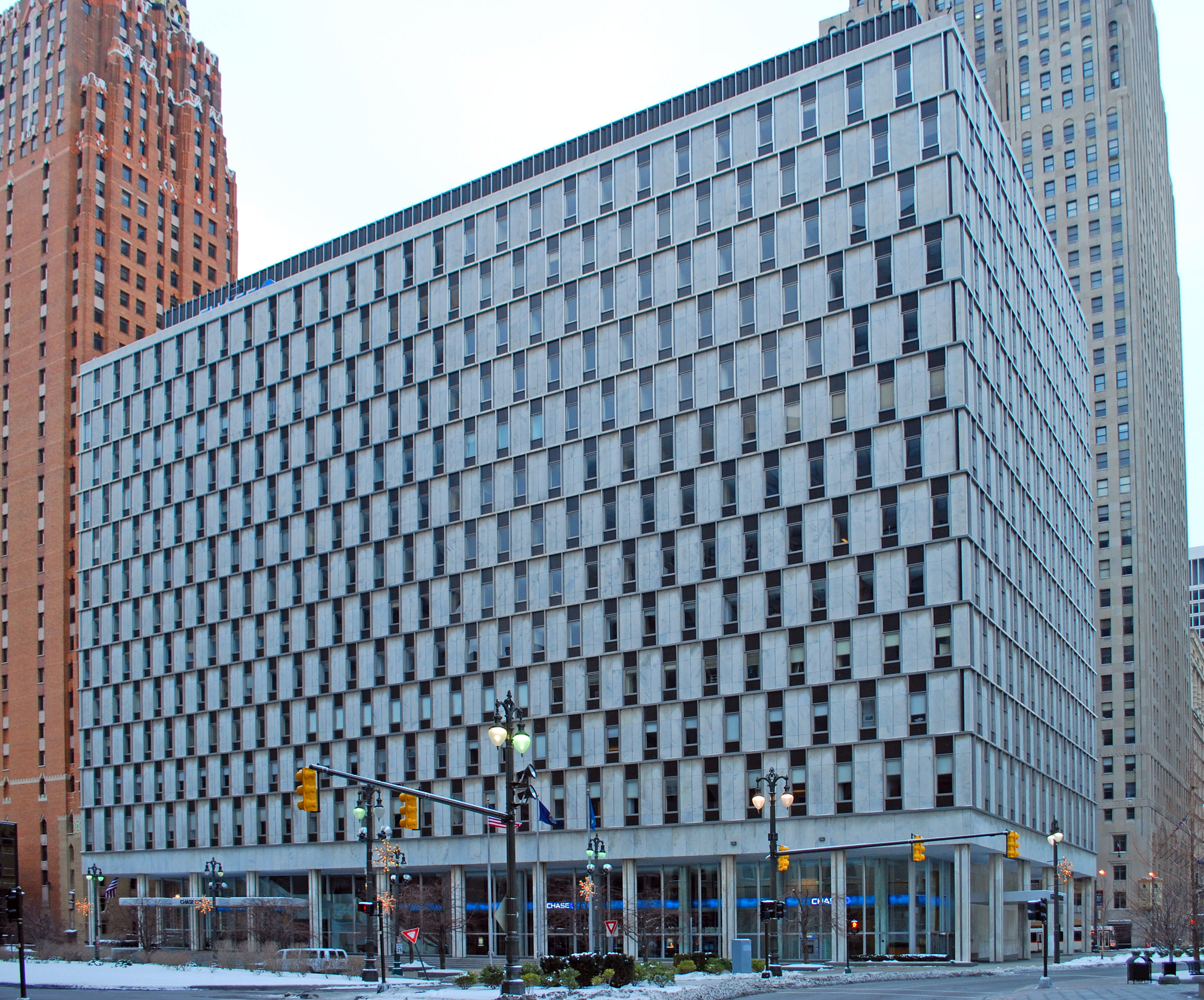
- Interactive map of the The Qube area

General information
- Architectural style: Modern
- Location: 611 Woodward Avenue; Detroit, Michigan, U.S.
- Coordinates: 42°19′50″N 83°2′48″W
- Current tenants: Rocket Mortgage; Chase Bank
- Completed: 1959
- Owner: Bedrock Detroit

Height
- Height: 204.00 ft (62.18 m)

Technical details
- Floor count: 14
- Lifts/elevators: 16

Design and construction
- Architect: Albert Kahn Associates

Other information
- Public transit: Financial District; Congress Street; DDOT 3, 5, 6, 9, 40, 52, 67; SMART FAST Michigan 261, Woodward 461, 462, Gratiot 561
- The Qube
- U.S. Historic district – Contributing property
- Location within Michigan Location within the United States
- Built: 1959; 67 years ago
- Part of: Detroit Financial District (ID09001067)
- Designated CP: December 14, 2009; 16 years ago

The Qube is a 14-story office building in downtown Detroit, Michigan. It is located on Campus Martius at the northeast corner of the Detroit Financial District. Designed by Albert Kahn Associates in the modern architectural style, it includes a great deal of marble, similar to other buildings in the nearby Civic Center.

The building is also known as the Chase Tower and was formerly named the National Bank of Detroit Building and Bank One Center.

== History ==
The Qube stands on the site of Detroit's first skyscraper, the Hammond Building. The ground floor of this building is a massive 1.5-story glass sheathed, banking hall. The building was constructed as headquarters for the National Bank of Detroit in 1959 and was known as 'Chase Tower' from 2006 to 2011 to reflect Chase Bank's buyout of Bank One. In March 2007, the Sterling Group purchased the tower from JP Morgan Chase. Occupancy was approximately 50 percent at the time of sale. The building has had names corresponding to each of the three successive banks that have owned it: National Bank of Detroit (NBD), succeeded by Bank One, and lastly Chase. The building has gone by several names in the past, most notably: Bank One Center, National Bank of Detroit Building, Bank One Building, and Chase Tower.

In April 2011, Quicken Loans bought the building, renamed it the Qube and relocated 4,000 of the company's employees to the facility. The company plans to fill remaining space with retail.

In August 2014, the Detroit bureau of Southfield-based ABC affiliate WXYZ-TV moved into the Qube after spending several decades across from the headquarters of the Detroit Police Department; its new location now includes satellite studio and newsroom facilities.

== Location ==
The building is located on the block bordered by Woodward Avenue to the east, with the First National Building across Woodward. West Fort Street borders the building on the north, with Cadillac Square and 1001 Woodward across the street. Griswold Street borders the building to the west, with the Penobscot Block and Chrysler House across the street. West Congress Street borders the building to the south, with the Guardian Building across the street. Across Woodward Avenue from the Guardian Building lies Ally Detroit Center, and the Buhl Building lies across Griswold Street, to the west. The building has a similar shape and size to the building at 411 West Lafayette, which Comerica Bank sold to the Sterling Group in 2025.

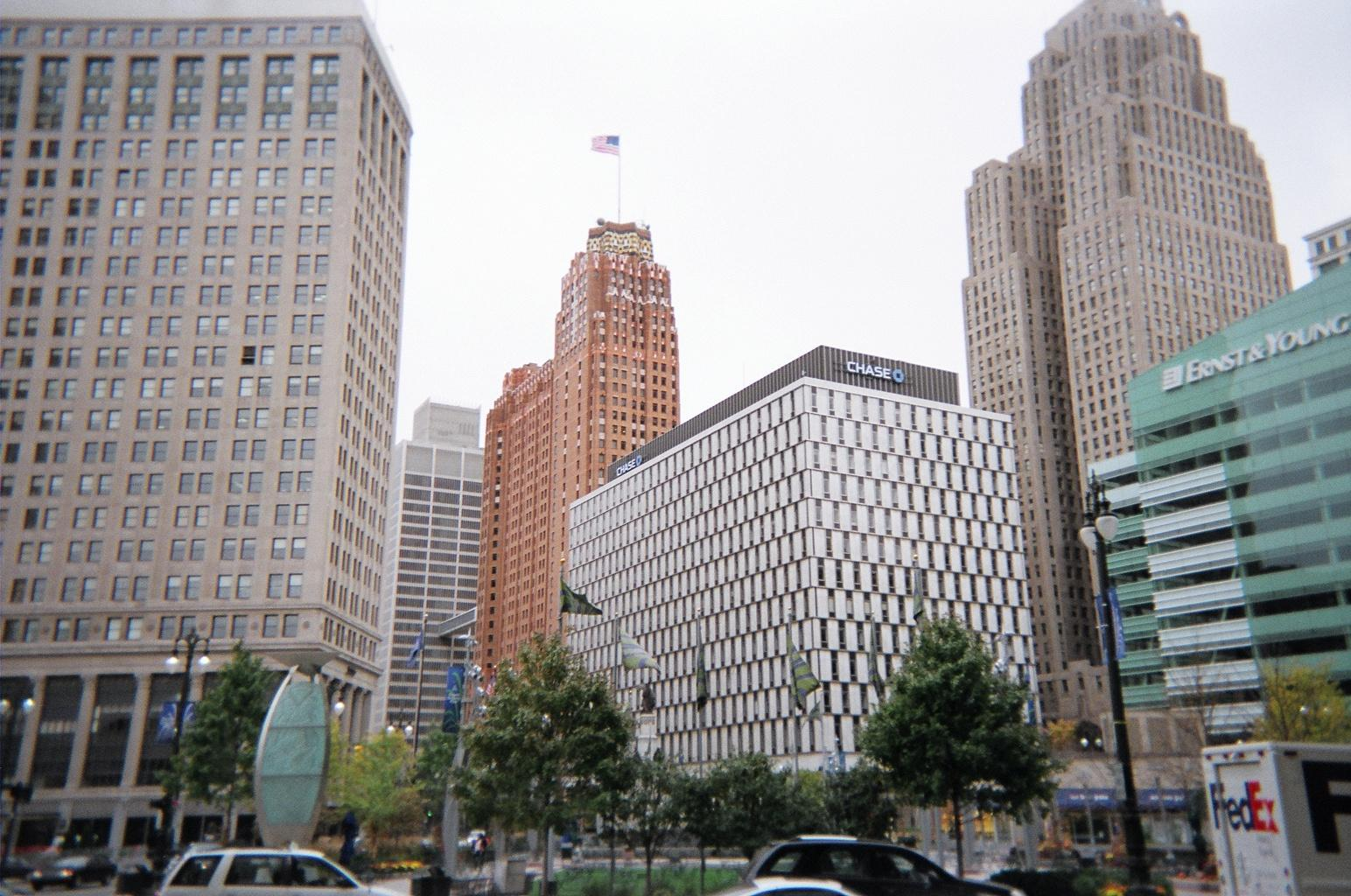
The Qube (white low rise), viewed from Campus Martius Park

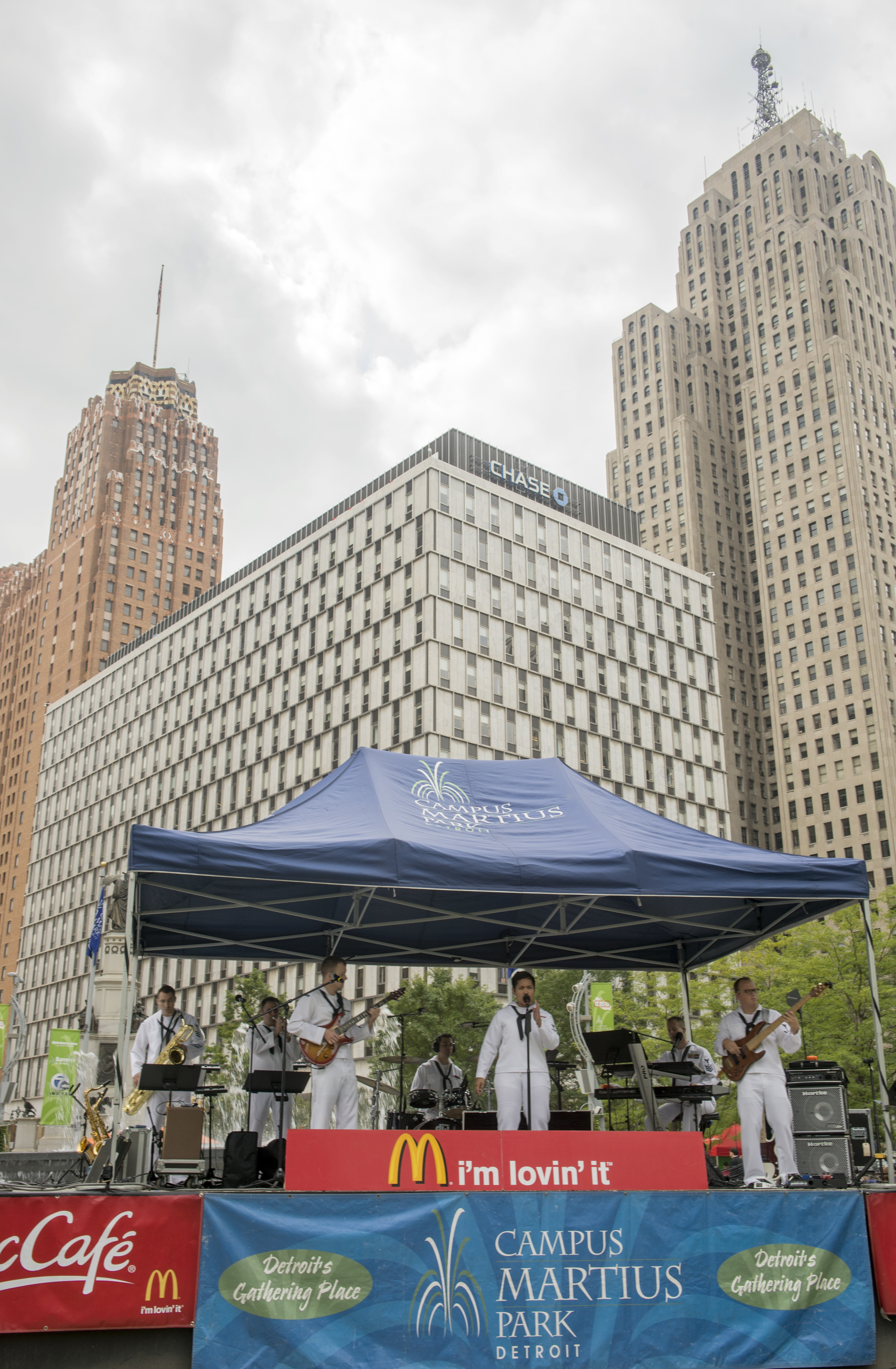
A naval band performing outside the Qube in August 2015
