= United Way Community Services Building =

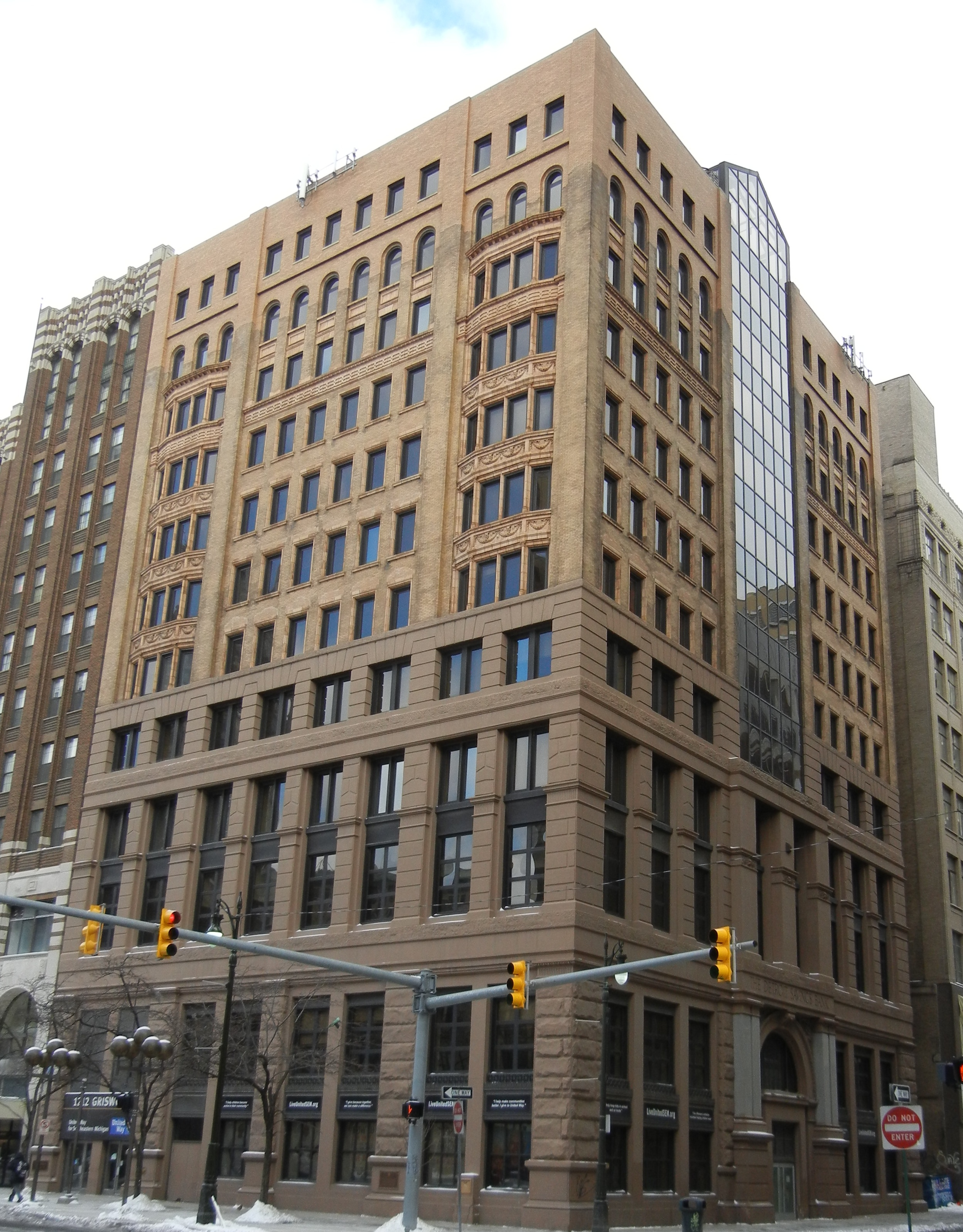
- Interactive map of the United Way Community Services Building area
- Former names: Detroit Savings Bank Building; Chamber of Commerce Building

General information
- Type: Commercial offices
- Location: 1212 Griswold Street; Detroit, Michigan
- Coordinates: 42.33281°N 83.0486°W
- Construction started: 1892
- Completed: 1895
- Owner: Capital Park Partners

Height
- Roof: 48.77 m (160.0 ft)

Technical details
- Floor count: 12

Design and construction
- Architect: Spier and Rohns

The United Way Community Services Building is a high-rise office building completed in 1895 at 1212 Griswold Street, at the northeast corner of State Street, in the Capitol Park Historic District of downtown Detroit, Michigan. The 48.77 m (160.0 ft) 12-story building was designed by architects Spier & Rohns and was the tallest in the state when built. The lower two floors are faced with a brown rusticated stone with the main entry centered on the south façade and framed by four square pilasters of gray granite. Floors three through five are smooth stone and floors six through twelve are tan brick. The structure originally had an elaborate cornice surrounding the twelfth floor which was removed in the 1950s. The light court which extended from the fifth to twelfth floor above the entry was filled in 1988 and faced with glass and a gabled glass roof to provide additional office space.

== History ==
The building was owned and occupied by the United Way for Southeastern Michigan from 1987 to 2009; the city's redevelopment agency purchased it from United way for $1.75 million. For many years prior to 1987, it was known as the Detroit Savings Bank Building and contained offices for the Detroit Savings Bank, which became Detroit Bank and Trust and later Comerica.

At the time of construction it was known as the Chamber of Commerce Building and, at 12 stories, is Detroit's oldest existing skyscraper and among the first constructed in the city with a steel skeleton. The 10-story Hammond Building (1889), now demolished, is considered the city's first skyscraper. The Qube in the Detroit Financial District now stands on former Hammond Building site.

In May 2013, the Archdiocese of Detroit announced it would consolidate offices from multiple sites in the city into approximately 50,000 sq ft (4,600 m^{2}) of the building, currently owned by Capitol Park Partners, LLC. After renovations were completed, the chancery and other components moved into the lower six floors of the structure in early 2015, with residences on the upper floors. Part of the renovations included re-creating a cornice at the top of the façade. Richard Karp, whose company oversaw the renovations, said he also plans to restore the name of the Detroit Savings Bank Building.

== Gallery ==
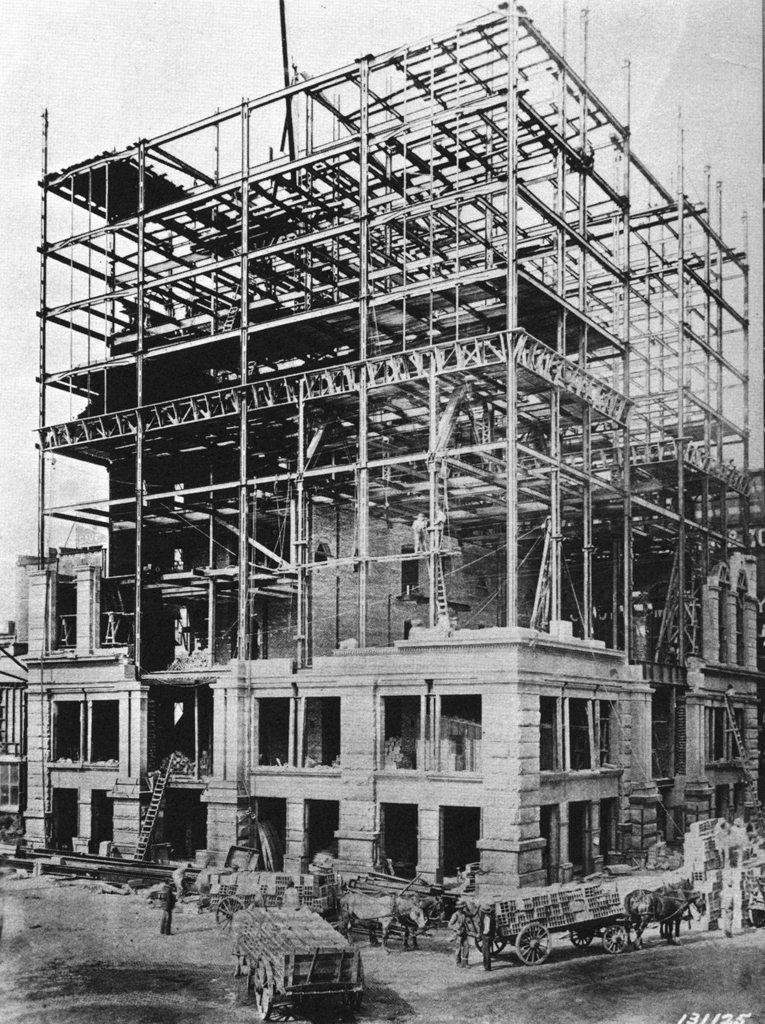
The building during construction c.1893

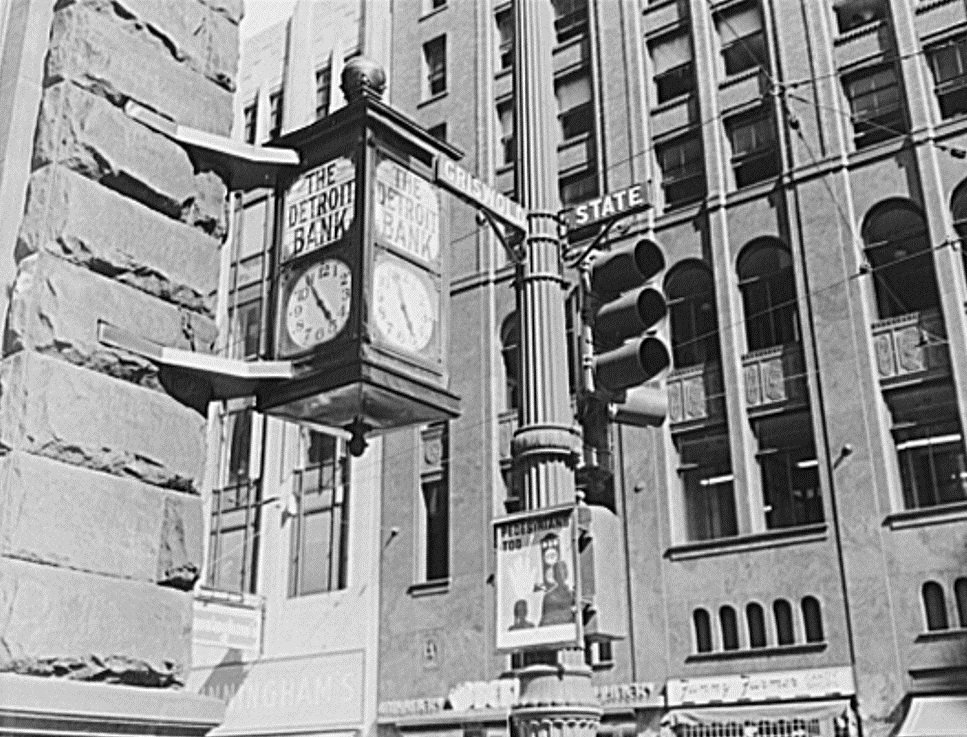
Clock at Griswold and State Streets, July 1942
