= The Albert (Detroit) =

- Griswold Building
- U.S. National Register of Historic Places
- U.S. Historic district – Contributing property
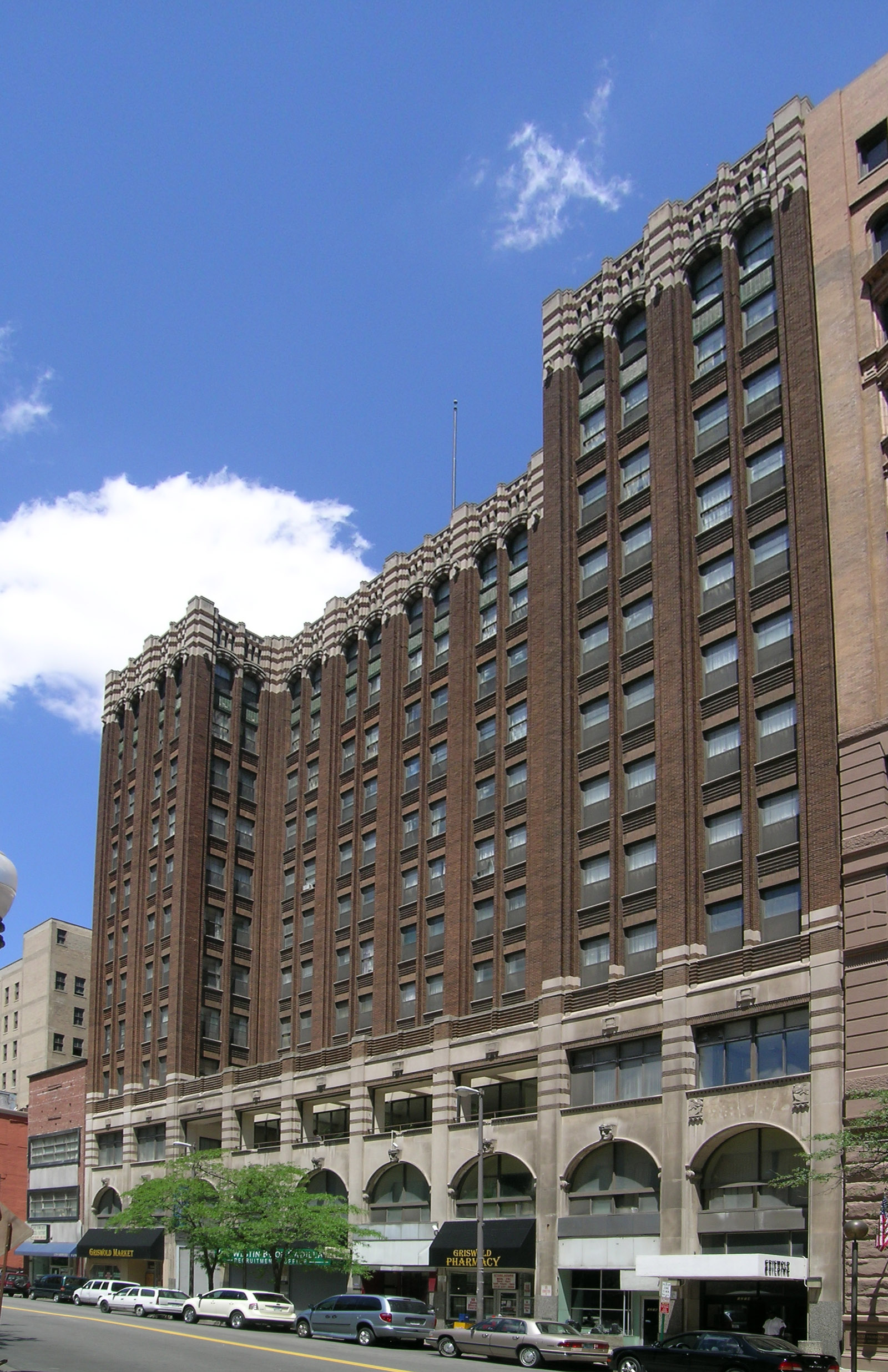
- Interactive map
- Location: 1214 Griswold Street; Detroit, Michigan
- Coordinates: 42°19′58.77″N 83°2′56.23″W
- Built: 1929
- Architect: Albert Kahn
- Architectural style: Modern Movement
- Part of: Capitol Park Historic District (ID99000338)
- NRHP reference No.: 80001923
- Added to NRHP: June 09, 1980

The Albert, formerly the Griswold Building, is a former office building named after architect Albert Kahn, located at 1214 Griswold Street in Downtown Detroit, Michigan. It was listed on the National Register of Historic Places in 1980 and is part of the Capitol Park Historic District. In 2014, it was renovated into apartments.

== History ==
The Griswold Building was built in 1929 as an office building, on the former site of the Miles Theatre, and was later converted to residential use in the 1980s as senior apartment building.

The Albert was renovated as of fall 2014. The renovation converted the building's HUD Section-8 senior housing to 127 market-rate apartments, with 14,000 square feet of retail space on the building's first floor.

== Description ==
The Albert stands 12 floors in height, with 127 units/rooms. The high-rise was designed by Albert Kahn in the Art Moderne architectural style, and is significant as an example of the architect's transition from Art Deco to Art Moderne. The façade is divided into two sections: a lower, three-story portion faced with limestone and divided into nine bays, and an upper, nine-story portion constructed of brick with five center bays set back from the main façade.
