= David Stott Building =

Skyscraper in Detroit

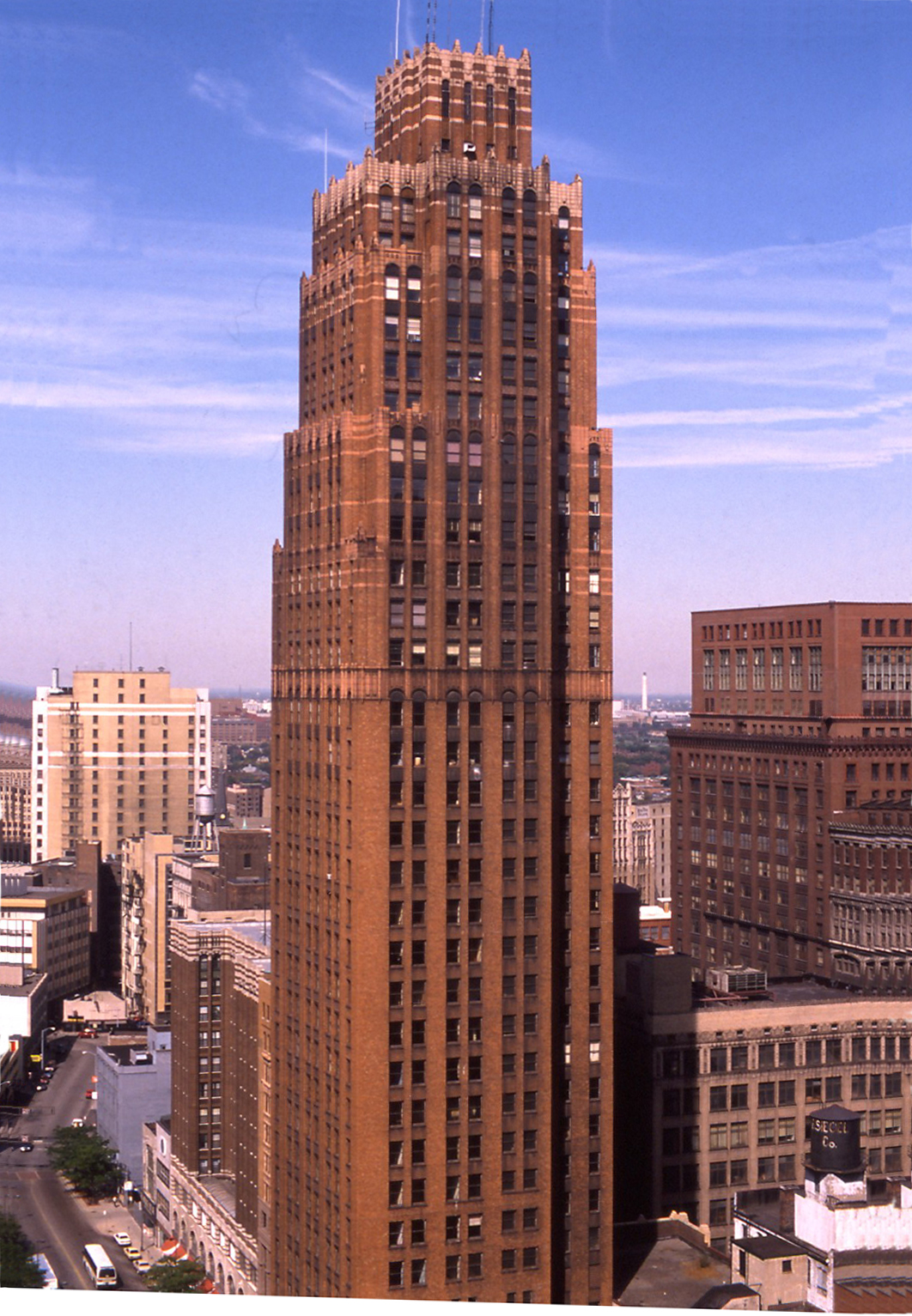

General information
- Type: Office
- Architectural style: Art Deco
- Location: 1150 Griswold Street; Detroit, Michigan
- Coordinates: 42.3320°N 83.0486°W
- Completed: 1929
- Owner: Bedrock Detroit

Height
- Antenna spire: 138 m (453 ft)
- Roof: 133.1 m (437 ft)
- Top floor: 131.8 m (432 ft)

Technical details
- Floor count: 38 stories
- Floor area: 18,784 m^{2} (202,190 sq ft)

Design and construction
- Architect: John M. Donaldson of Donaldson and Meier
- Main contractor: Martin & Krausmann Co.
- David Stott Building
- U.S. Historic district – Contributing property
- Part of: Capitol Park Historic District (ID99000338)
- Designated CP: March 18, 1999

The David Stott Building is a 38 story high-rise apartment building with office space on floors 2-6 and retail space on the first floor. The "Stott" was originally built as a class-A office building located at 1150 Griswold Street (corner of Griswold and State Streets) in Downtown Detroit, Michigan, within the Capitol Park Historic District. It was designed in the Art Deco style by the architectural firm of Donaldson and Meier and completed in 1929. Bedrock Detroit owns and manages the building which began leasing in late 2018 and includes 107 apartment homes and 5 floors of commercial office space.

== History ==
The skyscraper is named after David E. Stott (1853–1916), an English-born businessman who owned a mill company, the David Stott Flour Mills, and was on the boards of multiple other companies, including the Stott Realty Company. First conceived in 1921, the tower was built by the Stott Realty Company in honor of its founder twelve years after his death. Construction began on June 1, 1928, and the tower opened on June 17, 1929; it cost $3.5 million (equivalent to $51,800,000 in 2025) to build. The advent of the Great Depression brought a halt to all major construction in Detroit: as a result, the David Stott Building was the last skyscraper built in the city until the mid-1950s.

The building ceased operations in 2010 and was sold later that year for $922,000. The new owner proposed a conversion of the building to Mixed-Use and opened a bar called SkyBar Detroit in the lobby with intentions to open a private lounge in the 33rd floor penthouse. While the bar opened, the private lounge and Mixed-Use conversion were not completed. In September 2013, Shanghai-based DDI Group purchased the property for $8.95 million. In May 2015, it was purchased by Dan Gilbert for an undisclosed price.

== Architecture ==
The tower stands 38 stories tall, with three additional floors below street level; when it opened, it was the fourth tallest building in downtown Detroit. It was designed by architect John M. Donaldson of Donaldson and Meier in the Art Deco style. The building's design, characterized by a strong sense of verticality, was profoundly influenced by Eliel Saarinen's 1922 Chicago Tribune Tower design. Verticality is emphasized by the near absence of ornamentation, and by a relatively small footprint which yields a slender profile.

The building rises from a reddish granite base and incorporates buff-colored brick, marble (on the first three floors from the street), and limestone as its surface materials. As with many of the other Detroit buildings of the era, it boasts architectural sculpture by Corrado Parducci. The building features a series of setbacks from the 23rd floor upward. The tower's tiered summit is brightly lighted with uplights on each facade and complements the similarly lighted Westin Book Cadillac Hotel downtown. The David Stott Building neighbors 1001 Woodward to the southeast.

== Notable events ==
In August 2025, Detroit Pistons shooting guard Malik Beasley was evicted from the building over $7,355 of unpaid rent.

== Gallery ==
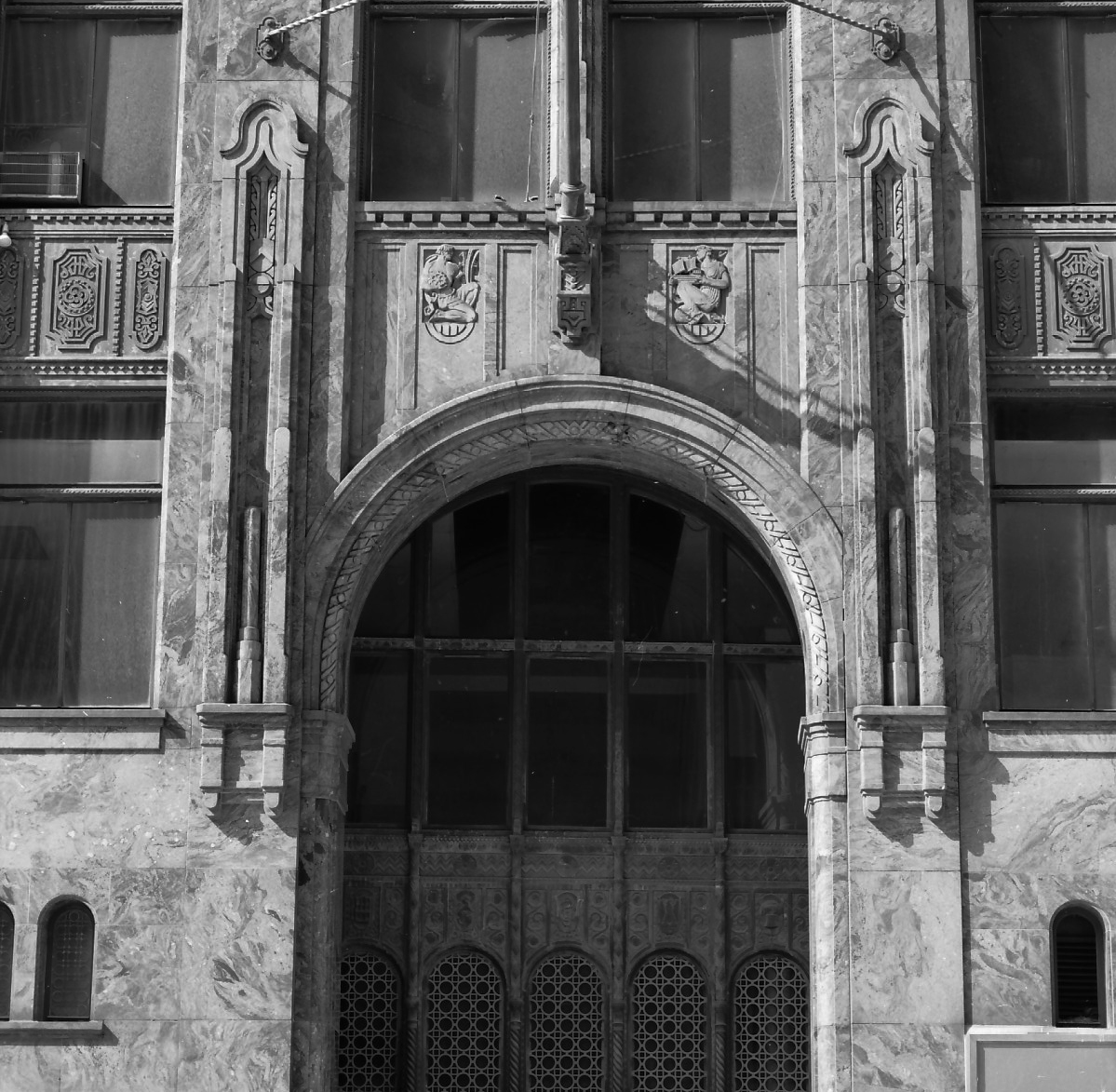
Main entrance, sculpture by Parducci

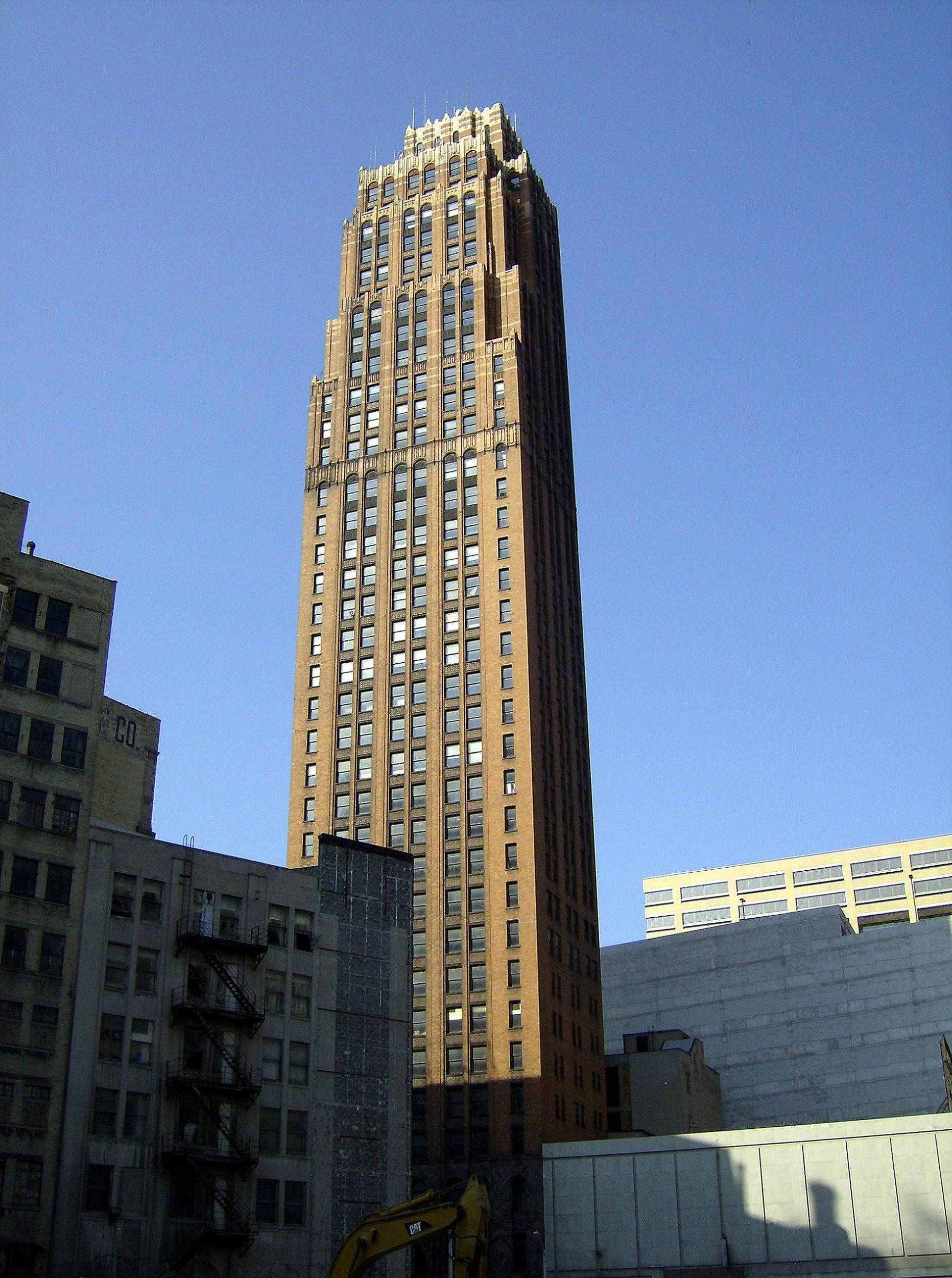
Compuware Headquarters in the bottom left

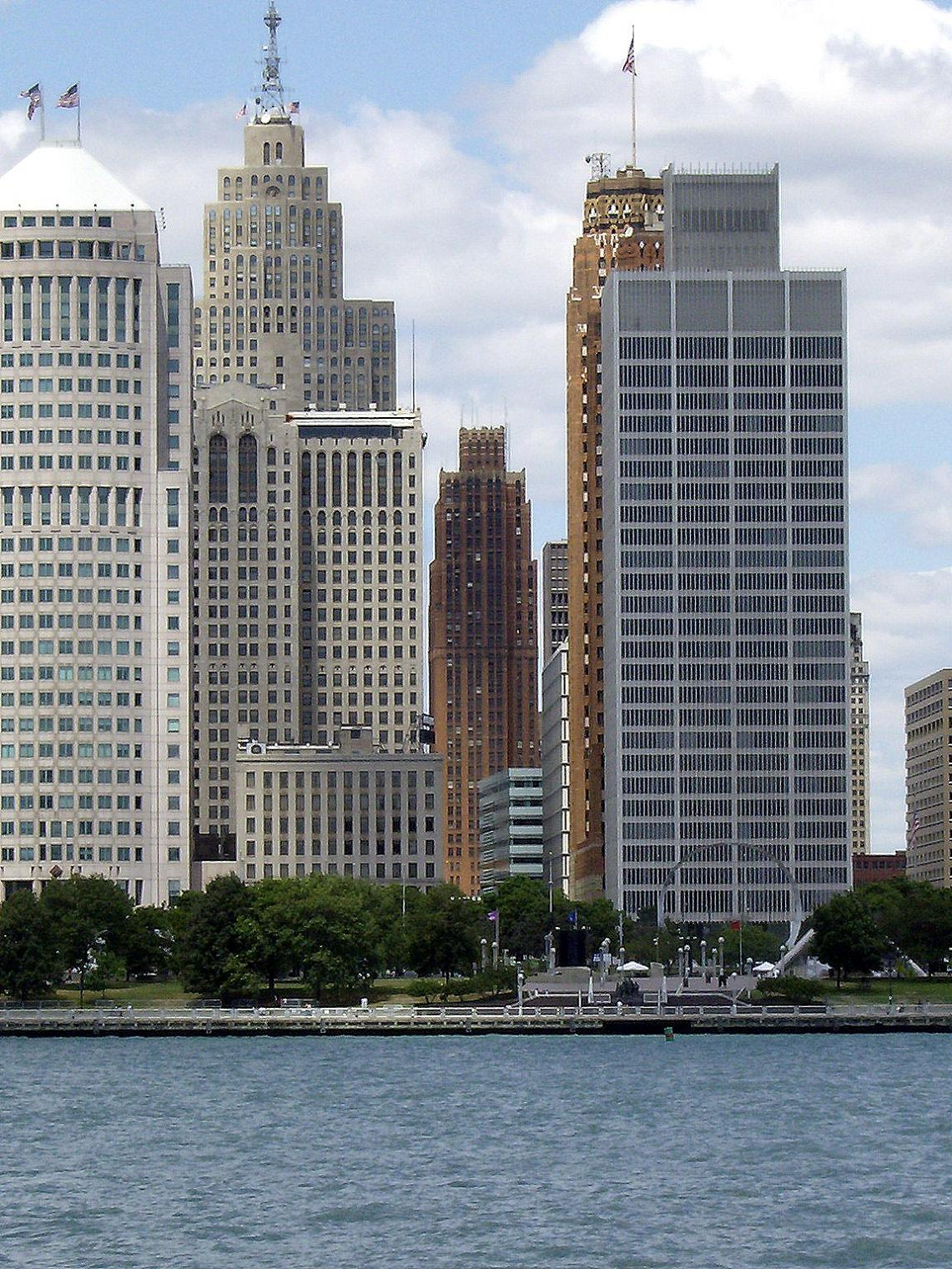
Downtown Detroit from Windsor. The David Stott Building stands at the center

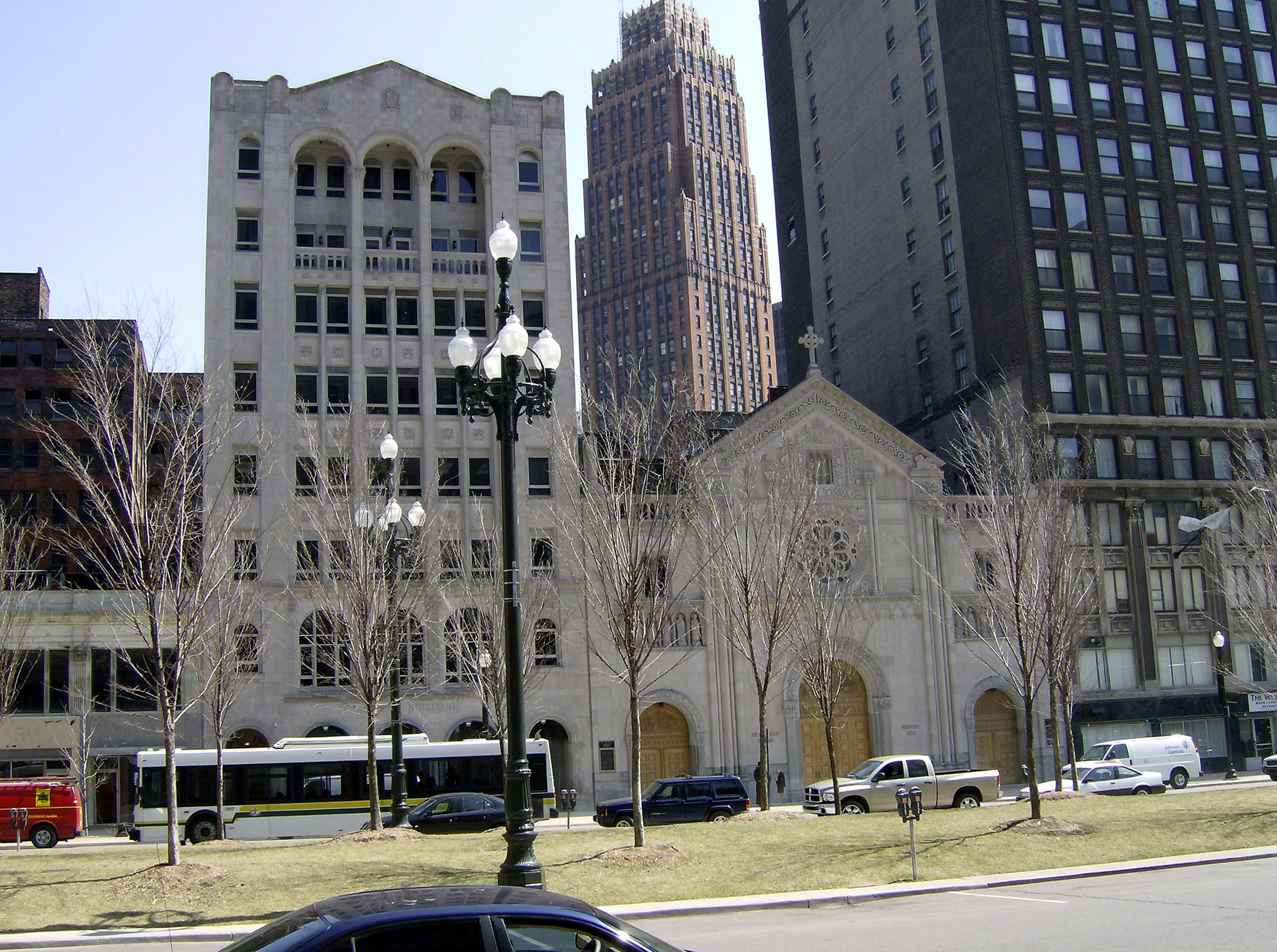
The Stott from across Washington Boulevard

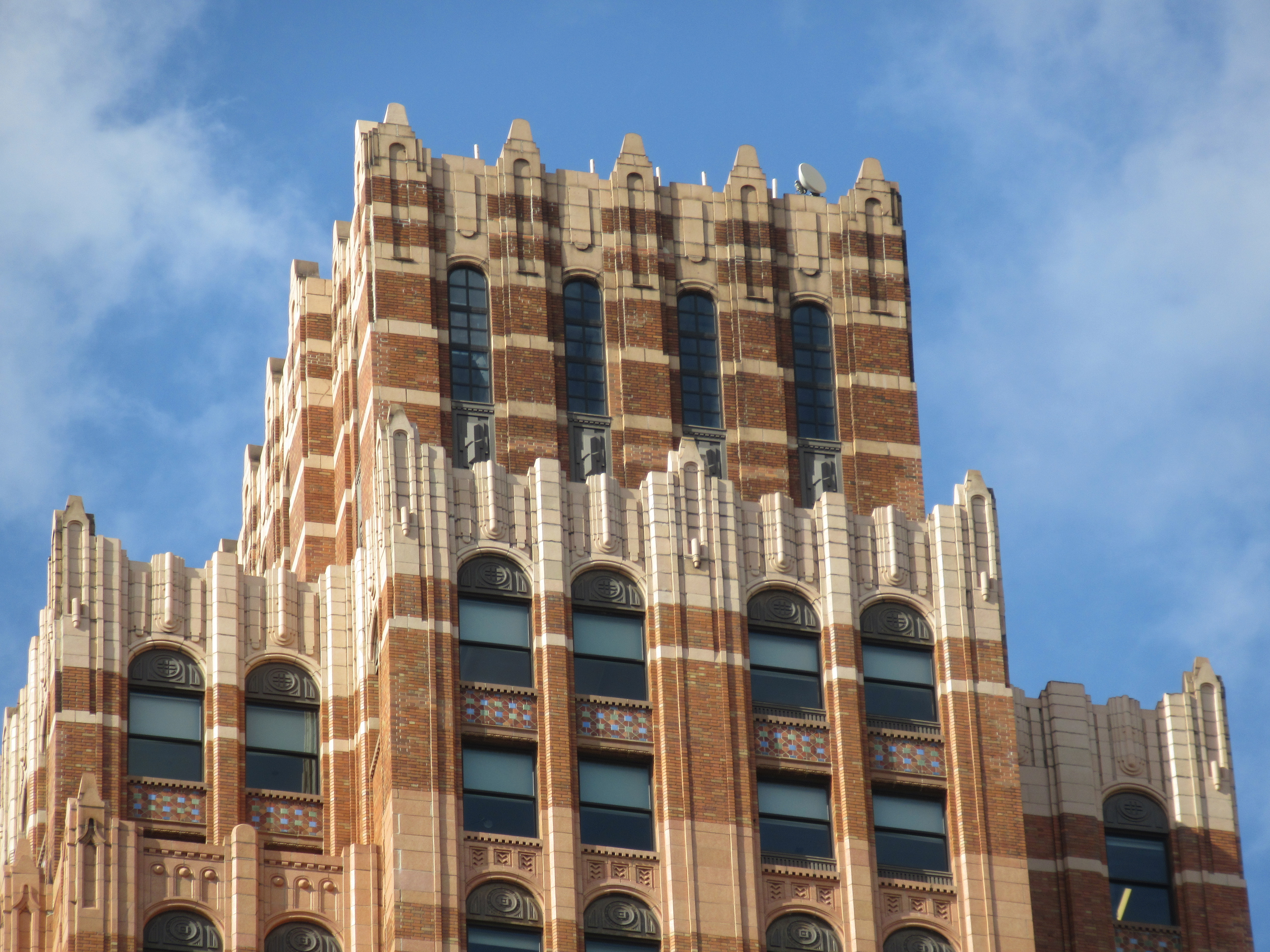
Detailing of the tiered roof

== See also ==
- Fisher Building
- Guardian Building
- List of tallest buildings in Detroit
