= National Bank of Detroit =

Defunct American commercial bank

NBD Bank

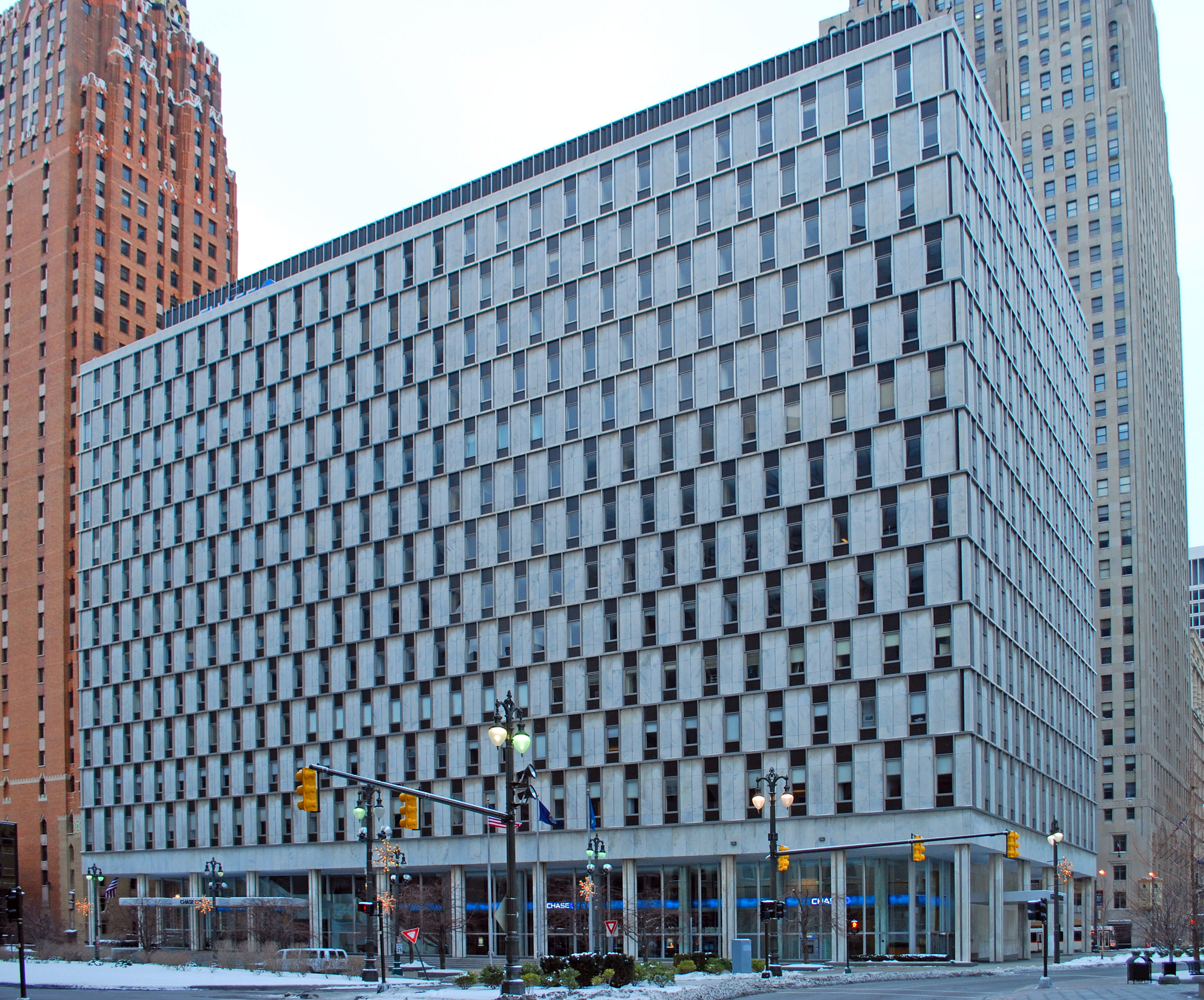
- Former NBD headquarters (1959–1995)
- Trade name: NBD Bank
- Formerly: National Bank of Detroit (1933–1990); NBD Bank (1990–1999)
- Type: Public
- Traded as: NYSE: NBD (1973–1995)
- Industry: Banking
- Founded: March 24, 1933; 93 years ago
- Defunct: December 1, 1995; 30 years ago (as an independent bank); May 17, 1999; 27 years ago (as a brand)
- Fate: Merged with First Chicago Bank (Note: First Chicago NBD Corporation operated under both the First Chicago Bank and NBD Bank names.) (1995); Acquired by Banc One Corporation (1998)
- Successor: Bank One (now Chase Bank)
- Headquarters: Detroit, Michigan
- Key people: Charles T. Fisher Jr.; Charles T. Fisher III; Verne G. Istock
- Products: Financial services
- Parent: National Detroit Corporation (1973–1981); NBD Bancorp (1981–1995); First Chicago NBD Corporation (1995–1998); Bank One Corporation (1998–1999)

The National Bank of Detroit (NBD), later renamed NBD Bank, was a bank that operated mostly in the Midwestern United States. Following its merger with First Chicago Bank, the bank was ultimately acquired and merged into Bank One, at which point the NBD name was discontinued. Today, what was once NBD is owned by JPMorgan Chase.

== History ==
NBD was founded in 1933 in Detroit in the midst of widespread bank failures during the Great Depression. Spurred by the Reconstruction Finance Corporation (RFC) to help stabilize the nation's banking system, NBD's shares were initially equally owned by General Motors (GM) and by the U.S. government under the RFC. The bank opened for business on March 24, 1933. Charles T. Fisher Jr., of the automobile body manufacturing family became a Director and the President in 1938, serving until his death in 1958 and assisted by Walter F. Truettner as vice-president. By 1945, GM had divested its ownership of bank stock, and by 1947 RFC had ended its involvement in the bank as well.

From 1959 until 1995, NBD was headquartered in the National Bank of Detroit Building (now The Qube).

In September 1993, Charles T. Fisher III stepped down as chairman, president and chief executive officer of NBD Bancorp and was replaced by Thomas H. Jeffs II as president and Verne G. Istock as chairman and chief executive officer.

In 1995, NBD merged with the First Chicago Bank; the combined bank was called First Chicago NBD. While NBD was the nominal survivor, the merged bank was based in Chicago. First Chicago NBD later merged with Bank One, which eliminated the NBD name in 1999. Bank One was itself purchased by JPMorgan Chase in 2004. As of 2026, most former NBD branches carry the Chase name.

NBD had branches in Toronto and Windsor, Ontario, and overseas in London's Finsbury Circus, in Tokyo, and in Frankfurt.

=== NBD Bancorp ===
Up until the 1970s, retail banks located within the state of Michigan were restricted to building branches within their home counties, but could have a branch office outside their home county only if that branch was located within a 25-mile radius of their main offices. Starting in 1972, the state legislature began to allow the formation of multibank holding companies. To take advantage of this new law, the National Bank of Detroit formed the National Detroit Corporation on January 1, 1973 as its holding company. The holding company began to offer stock on the New York Stock Exchange under the ticket symbol NBD. National Detroit Corp. was later renamed NBD Bancorp in 1981.

==== Michigan ====
In November 1974, National Detroit Corporation made its first acquisitions outside the Detroit area by the acquisition of the Grand Valley National Bank in Grandville for $3.4 million. The acquisition was first announced in February 1974.

In December 1974, National Detroit Corporation announced the pending acquisition of the Lansing-based Bank of Commerce. The acquisition was finalized in September 1975 for $3 million in cash.

In October 1977, National Detroit Corporation announced the pending acquisition of the Saginaw-based First State Bank of Saginaw for $9.4 million. The acquisition was finalized in November 1978 for $8.3 million.

In July 1978, National Detroit Corporation announced the pending acquisition of the Alpena-based Peoples Bank and Trust of Alpena for about $11 million in cash and notes.

In February 1979, National Detroit Corporation announced the pending acquisition of the Benton Harbor-based Farmers and Merchants National Bank. The acquisition was finalized in January 1980.

In August 1979, National Detroit Corporation announced the pending acquisition of the Cadillac-based West Michigan Financial Corp. for about $21.3 million. The acquisition was finalized in July 1980.

In September 1979, National Detroit Corporation announced the pending acquisition of the Ann Arbor-based National Ann Arbor Corp. for about $29 million in cash and notes. Shortly after National Detroit changed its name to NBD Bancorp, the acquisition was finalized in May 1981.

In October 1980, National Detroit Corporation announced the pending acquisition of the Roscommon-based Roscommon State Bank for about $9.9 million in cash and notes.

In November 1980, National Detroit Corporation announced the pending acquisition of the Sandusky-based Wolverine State Bank for about $11.2 million. The acquisition was finalized in November 1981.

In April 1983, NBD Bancorp announced the pending acquisition of the Pontiac-based Pontiac State Bank for $19.2 million. The acquisition was finalized in August 1984.

In March 1984, NBD Bancorp acquired the deposits from the failed National Bank & Trust Co. of Traverse City from the Federal Deposit Insurance Corporation.

In August 1984, NBD Bancorp announced the pending acquisition of the Flint-based United Michigan Corp. for $77.8 million. The acquisition was finalized in March 1985 for more than $78 million.

In August 1985, NBD Bancorp announced the pending acquisition of the Port Huron-based Peoples Bank of Port Huron for $22 million.

In December 1985, NBD Bancorp announced the pending acquisition of the Grand Rapids-based Union Bancorp for $104 million. The acquisition was finalized in June 1986.

In September 1986, NBD Bancorp announced the pending acquisition of the Wyandotte-based OmniBank, the holding company for Wyandotte Savings Bank, for $51 million. The acquisition was finalized in January 1987.

In April 1990, NBD Bancorp acquired the assets and the 8 offices of the failed Taylor-based New Guaranty Federal Savings & Loan Association from the Resolution Trust Corporation.

==== Indiana ====
NBD Bancorp made its first out-of-state move in May 1985 by announcing the pending acquisition of Midwest Commerce Corp. of Elkhart; however, NBD could not complete the transaction until the state of Michigan enacted a law that would permit such actions. The acquisition was finalized in May 1986 at a cost of $61 million in stock.

In June 1991, NBD Bancorp announced the pending acquisition of the Merrillville-based Gainer Bank for $134 million in stock. The acquisition was completed in the following January.

In December 1991, NBD Bancorp announced the pending acquisition of Fort Wayne-based Summcorp, the holding company for Summit Bank and four other banks. The $350 million in stock transaction was completed in July 1992.

In March 1992, NBD Bancorp announced the pending acquisition of the Indianapolis-based INB Financial Corporation, the largest Indiana-based bank holding company with its six subsidiary banks, including its flagship bank, Indiana National Bank, the largest Indiana owned bank at the time of the announcement. NBD paid $876 million in stock and the acquisition was completed in October 1992.

==== Illinois ====
NBD Bancorp entered the state of Illinois for the first time by announcing the pending acquisition of Bannockburn-based USAmeribancs with its six suburban Chicago-area banks for $250 million in stock in October 1986. The acquisition was completed a year later and USAmeribancs was renamed NBD Illinois Inc. and each of the banks were renamed NBD followed by the name of the geographical area in which each of the banks were located.

In June 1987, NBD Bancorp announced the pending acquisition of the State National Corp. of Evanston for $103 million in cash and stock.

In March 1988, NBD Bancorp announced the pending acquisition of the Charter Bank Group Inc. of Northfield for $65 million in stock and completed in September.

In March 1991, NBD Bancorp announced the pending acquisition of the Mount Prospect-based FNW Bancorp. with its 17 banks for $205 million in stock.

In March 1994, NBD Bancorp announced the pending acquisition of the Joliet-based Amerifed Financial Corporation, the holding company for the AmeriFed Federal Savings Bank, with its 10 offices for $149 million in stock. When the acquisition was completed, NBD had 51 offices in Illinois and 630 offices in Michigan, Indiana, Illinois, Ohio, and Florida.

In January 1995, NBD Bancorp announced the pending acquisition of the Deerfield-based Deerbank Corporation, the holding company for the Deerfield Federal Savings and Loan Association, with its 15 offices for $120 million in stock. The acquisition was completed in July. After the completion of the acquisition, NBD became the sixth largest bank in Illinois and also the largest bank in many counties in the suburban Chicago-area, but not in Chicago itself.

==== Florida ====
NBD Bancorp had a presence in state of Florida since 1982 when it established the NBD Trust Company of Florida, N.A. in West Palm Beach. The trust company later moved to North Palm Beach.

In June 1990, NBD Bancorp acquired the assets and offices of the failed Venice-based First Venice Savings & Loan Association from the Resolution Trust Corporation and formed a federal savings bank called NBD Bank, FSB.

In October 1991, NBD Bancorp acquired the Boca Raton-based First Fidelity Trust and merged the company into the North Palm Beach-based NBD Trust Company of Florida, N.A.

==== Ohio ====
In December 1990, NBD Bancorp entered Ohio by acquiring the assets and the 21 offices of the failed Columbus-based Mid-America Federal Savings and Loan from the Resolution Trust Corporation for $48 million and converted them into full service banks. The insolvent S&L had 13 offices in Columbus and eight in Dayton. The new Ohio bank that was created to handle this acquisition was called NBD Ohio, Inc.

After increasing the number of offices in Columbus from 13 to 17 while the number of offices in Dayton had remained at 8, NBD decided to leave the state of Ohio by selling all of the assets and offices of NBD Ohio to Fifth Third Bank in October 1995 for an undisclosed amount. The divestiture was finalized in February 1996 for $52 million.

=== Merger with First Chicago ===
On July 12, 1995, First Chicago Corporation and NBD Bancorp Inc. announced that the two companies were planning to merge by swapping stock that was worth $5.3 billion. As part of the deal, First Chicago shareholders would own 50.1 percent of the combined company, while NBD shareholders would own 49.9 percent. Richard L. Thomas, chairman and chief executive of First Chicago, would be chairman of the combined company until May 20, 1996, when he plans to resign. Verne G. Istock, chairman of NBD, would be president and chief executive of the combined company until Thomas steps down and replace Thomas as chairman of the combined company.

The merger was finalized on December 1, 1995 with the formation of the First Chicago NBD Corporation. On that date, stock for the new company began trading on the New York Stock Exchange under the symbol "FCN".

Most customers did not see much of a change as a result of the merger except in suburban Chicago where there was branch overlap. This problem was resolved by the closing of 15 former NBD and 9 former First Chicago offices and the rebranding of the remaining NBD offices to the First Chicago brand. Outside of Illinois, NBD branches were left unaffected.

In February 1996, First Chicago NBD sold all of their NBD offices in Ohio to Fifth Third Bank.

== See also ==
- Bank One Corporation
- First Chicago Bank
- JPMorgan Chase
