= Capitol Park Historic District =

Historic district in Michigan, United States

- U.S. National Register of Historic Places
- U.S. Historic district
- Michigan State Historic Site
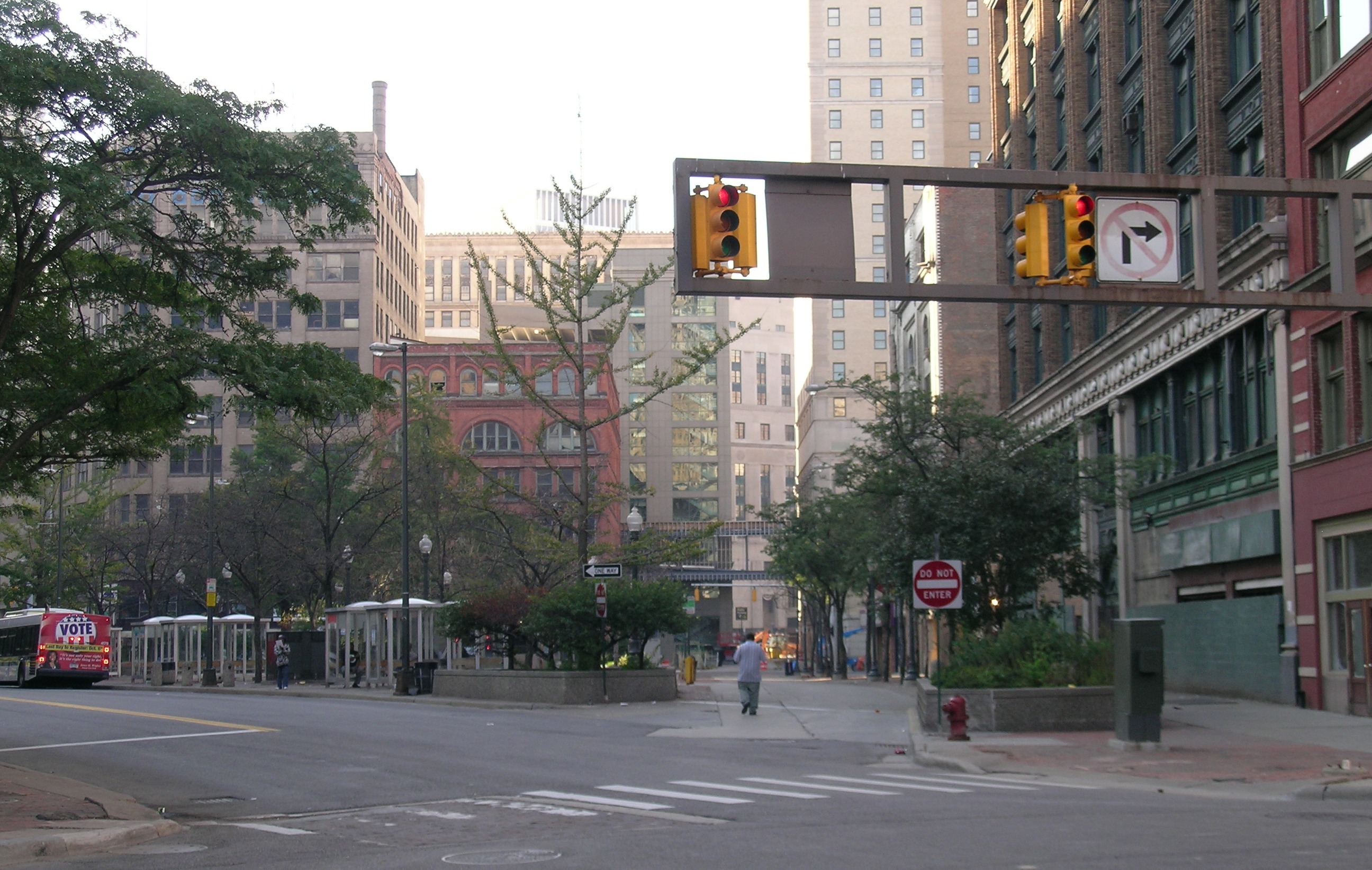
- Capitol Park, from the north
- Interactive map
- Location: Detroit, Michigan, U.S.
- Coordinates: 42°19′58″N 83°2′58″W
- Built: 1877
- Architect: Albert Kahn Associates et al.
- Architectural style: Italianate, Romanesque Revival
- NRHP reference No.: 99000338
- Added to NRHP: March 18, 1999

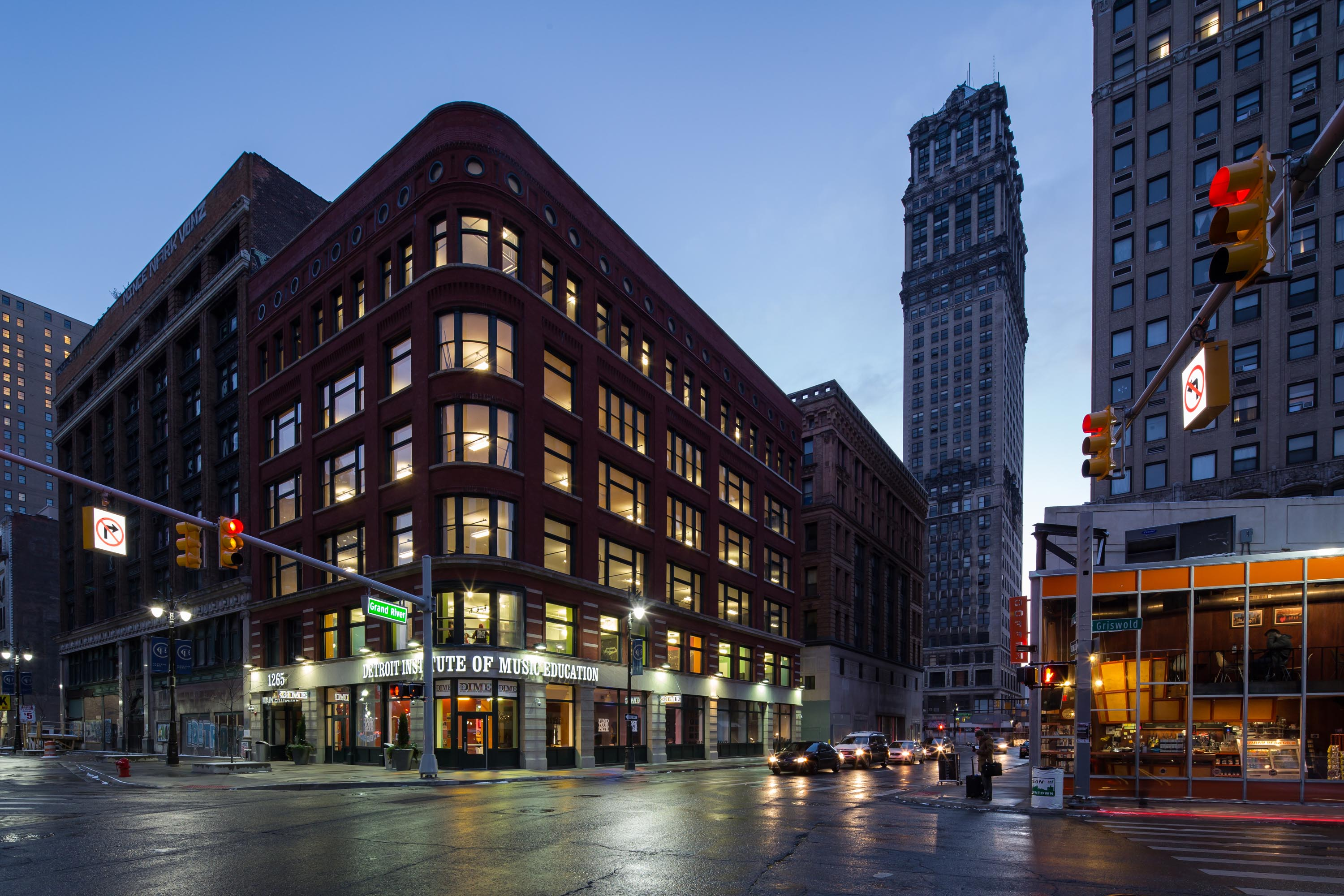
The Detroit Institute of Music Education at 1265 Griswold St in Capitol Park

The Capitol Park Historic District is a historic district located in downtown Detroit, Michigan. It is roughly bounded by Grand River, Woodward and Michigan Avenues, and Washington Boulevard. The district was listed on the National Register of Historic Places in 1999.

== Description ==
Capitol Park itself is a triangular plot of land (now a public park) bounded by Shelby Street, Griswold Street, and State Street. The plot is an artifact of Augustus Woodward's 1805 plan for the city of Detroit. The Historic District includes the park and seventeen surrounding buildings for a block in each direction. Buildings within the district include the Farwell Building, the Griswold Building, the David Stott Building, the Detroit Savings Bank Building and the Industrial Building.

== History ==
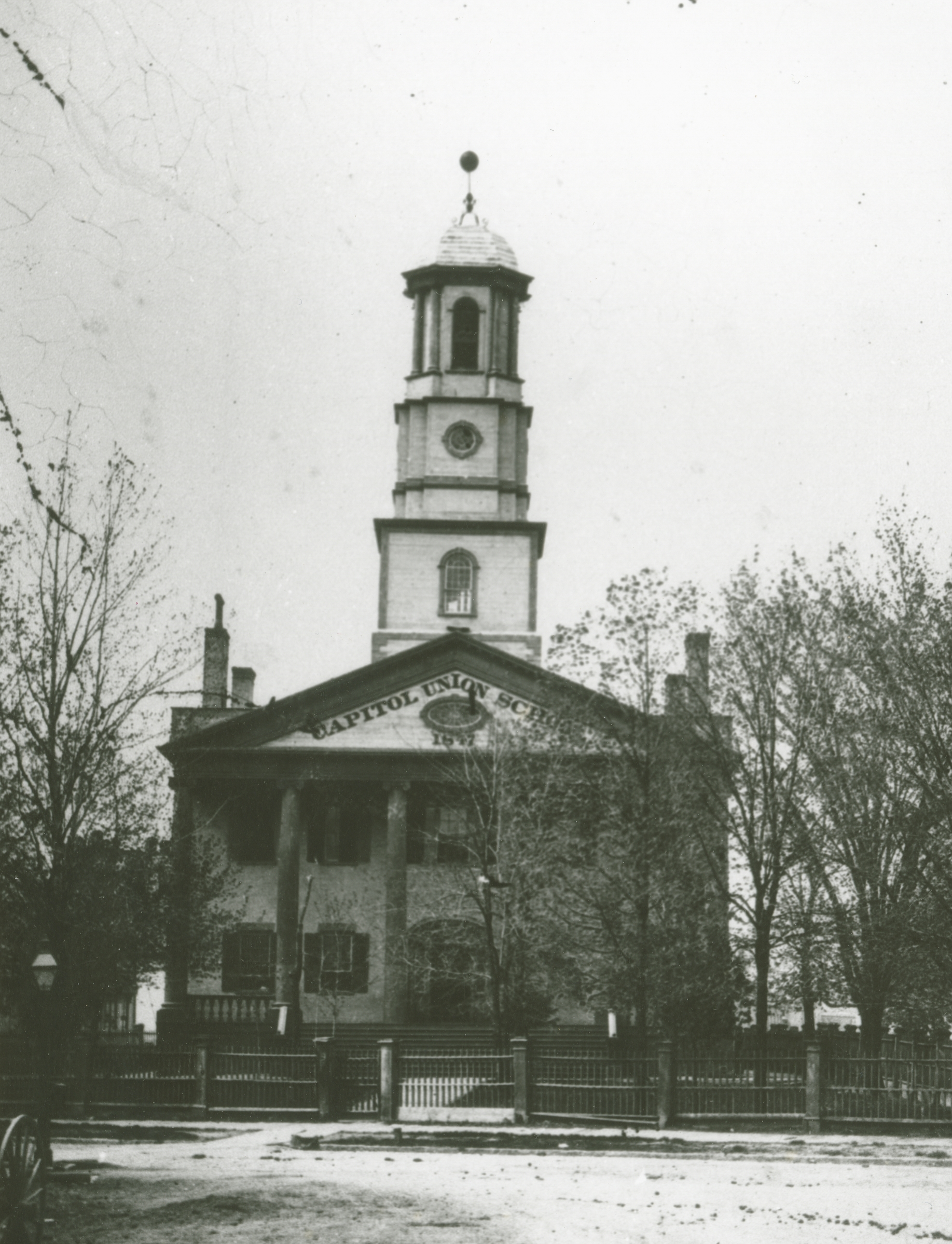
The first capitol building in Detroit, c. 1847

In 1823, the population of Detroit had increased to the point that the US Congress transferred governance of what was then the Territory of Michigan to the governor and legislative council. To house the new government, a courthouse was built in Capitol Park in 1823–28. When Michigan became a state in 1837, the building became the state capitol, and functioned so until 1847 when the governmental seat was moved to Lansing. The building was then used as a public high school until 1893, when it was destroyed by fire. The land was then converted to a park, and it has remained a public space up to the present.

The buildings within the Historic District surrounding the park were built primarily during the first three decades of the 20th century for commercial and business purposes. Several famous architects, including Albert Kahn and Gordon W. Lloyd, contributed buildings in a range of styles, from Victorian to Beaux-Arts to Art Deco. The buildings demonstrate the transformation of Detroit from a prospering 19th century commercial center to a modern city.

In addition to the present buildings, Capitol Park has a historic connection to the Underground Railroad. In 1850, Seymour Finney purchased a plot of land near the park and erected a tavern with a large barn. Finney was strongly sympathetic to the abolitionist cause, and used his barn to hide escaping slaves before their final trek across the river into Canada. A State of Michigan historical marker has been erected in the park to commemorate Finney's Barn.

In 1905, the remains of Michigan's first governor Stevens T. Mason were transferred from New York City where he died 1843 and interred in Capitol Park in a ceremony attended by sitting governor Fred M. Warner and mayor George P. Codd among other officials. A statue of Mason by sculptor Albert Weinert was later erected over the grave. When plans were announced in 2009 to reconfigure the park, they included relocating the monument and grave. However, the burial vault was not where earlier plans indicated and crews searched for four days before it was located on June 29, 2010. It was believed the grave was moved from its 1905 location in 1955 to make room for a bus terminal. On the 199th anniversary of his birth, October 27, 2010, Mason was reburied for 4th time in a newly built vault in the pedestal the bronze statue. The current dean of the Cathedral Church of St. Paul, where funeral services were held for Mason in 1843, officiated at the ceremony.

== Transit hub & redevelopment ==
The park has also served as a major downtown transit center. Two years after the destruction of the state capitol by fire, multiple streetcar lines were looped around the new park with large boarding platforms constructed on Griswold and Shelby streets, transforming it into a major transfer station. In 1955, the Department of Street Railways (DSR) constructed the $280,000 (~$2.55 million in 2024) Capitol Park Bus Terminal at the north end of the park which facilitated the moving of Stevens T. Mason's tomb to the south end of the park. The new facility was constructed using steel and reinforced concrete, with plastic skylights throughout the concrete canopy. Not long after the restructuring of the DSR as the Detroit Department of Transportation (DDOT), the station was demolished in 1979, though the area around the park continued to be used as a major bus terminal.

In 2001, the area was named as the Capitol Park Transit Center, and was used as a temporary terminal until the completion of the Rosa Parks Transit Center. The opening of the Rosa Parks Transit Center in downtown Detroit in July 2009 marked the end of Capitol Park's use as a transportation center. A $1.1 million (~$1.56 million in 2024) renovation project started in September 2009 by the city's Downtown Development Authority redeveloped the public space in an effort to draw new businesses to the area.

== Gallery ==
Capitol Park in 1942, looking north. Photograph by Arthur Siegel.

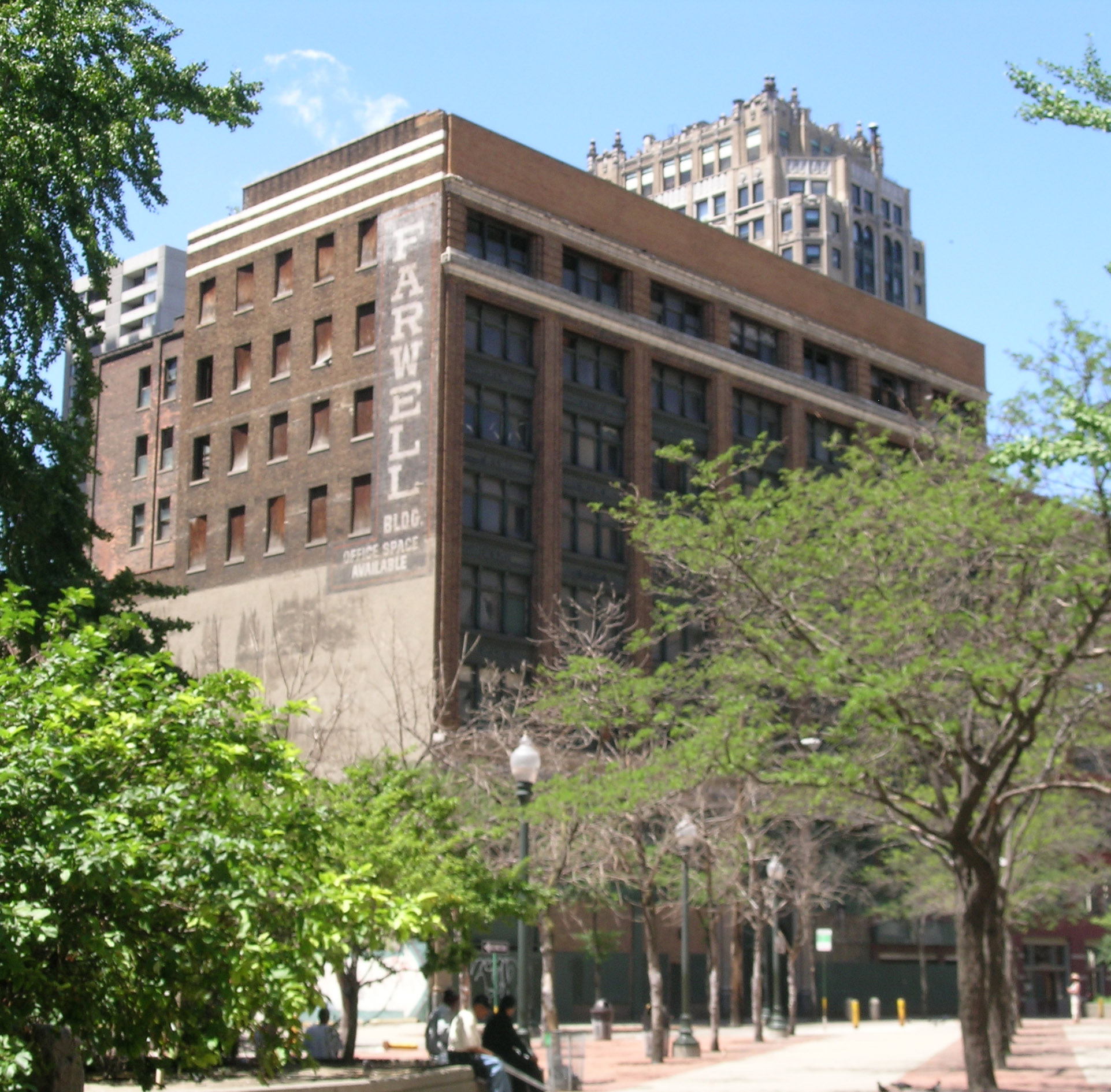
Farwell Building, looking through Capitol Park

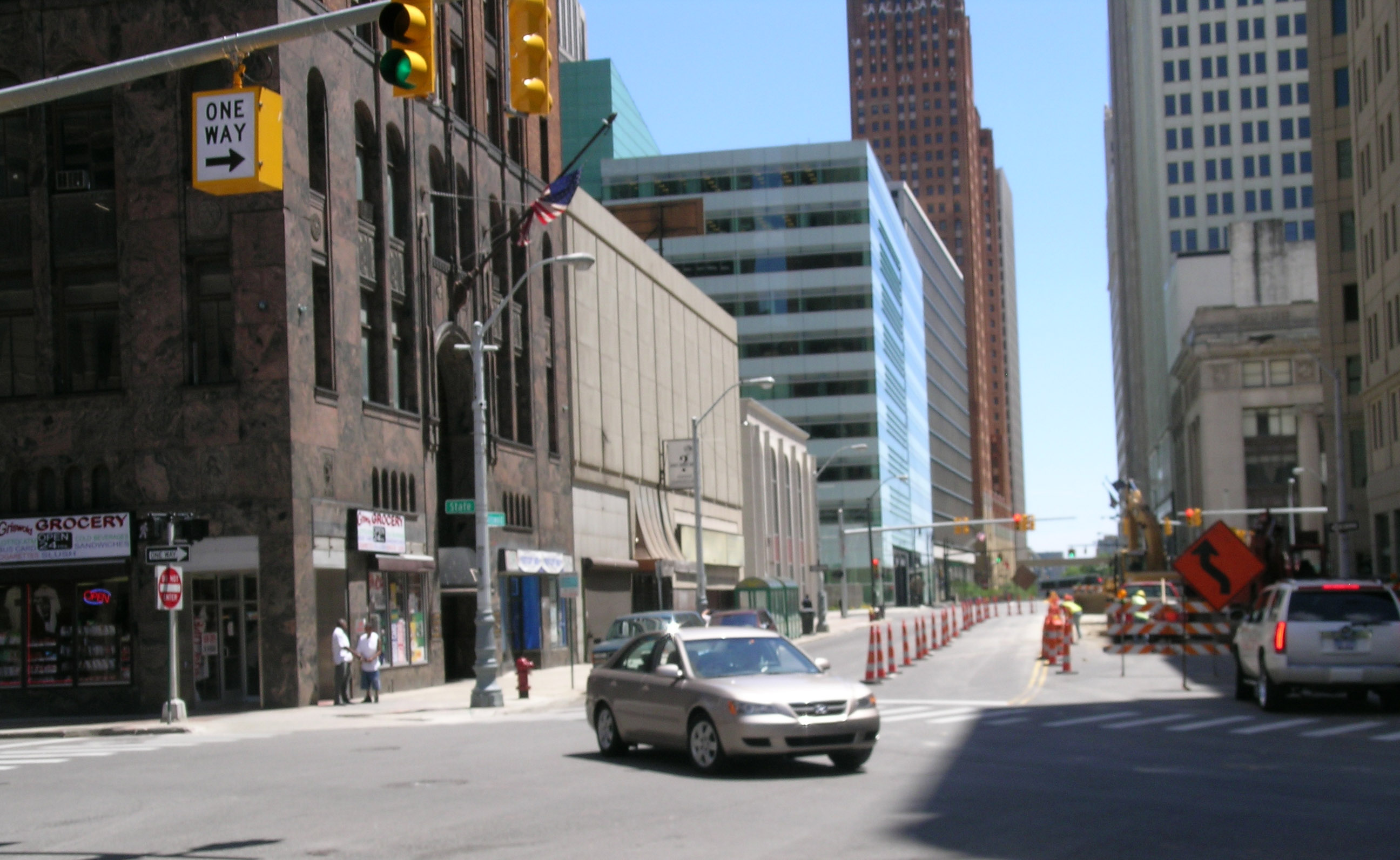
Looking south on Griswold at State, with The David Stott Building on the left

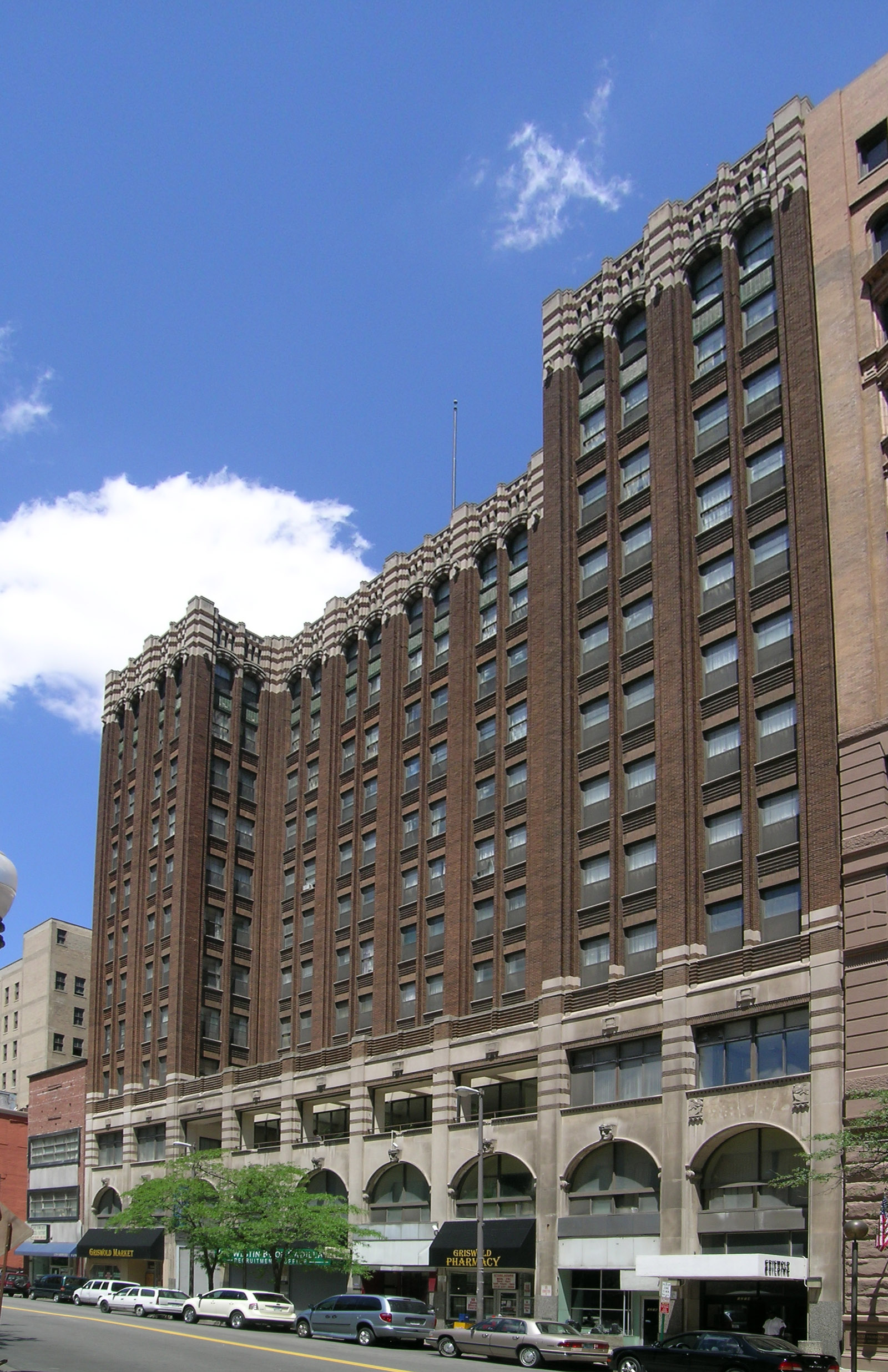
Griswold Building

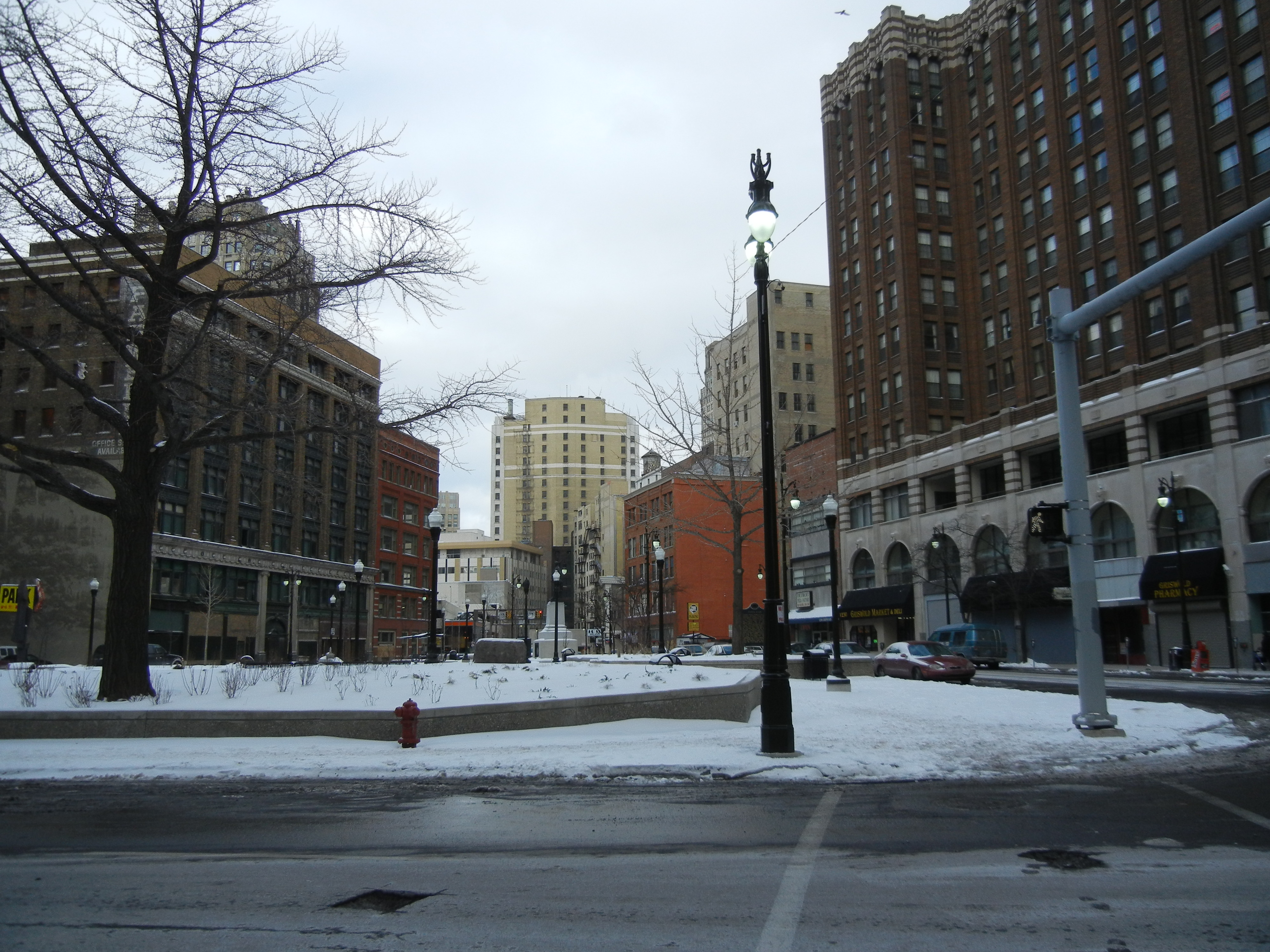
Capitol Park in 2011

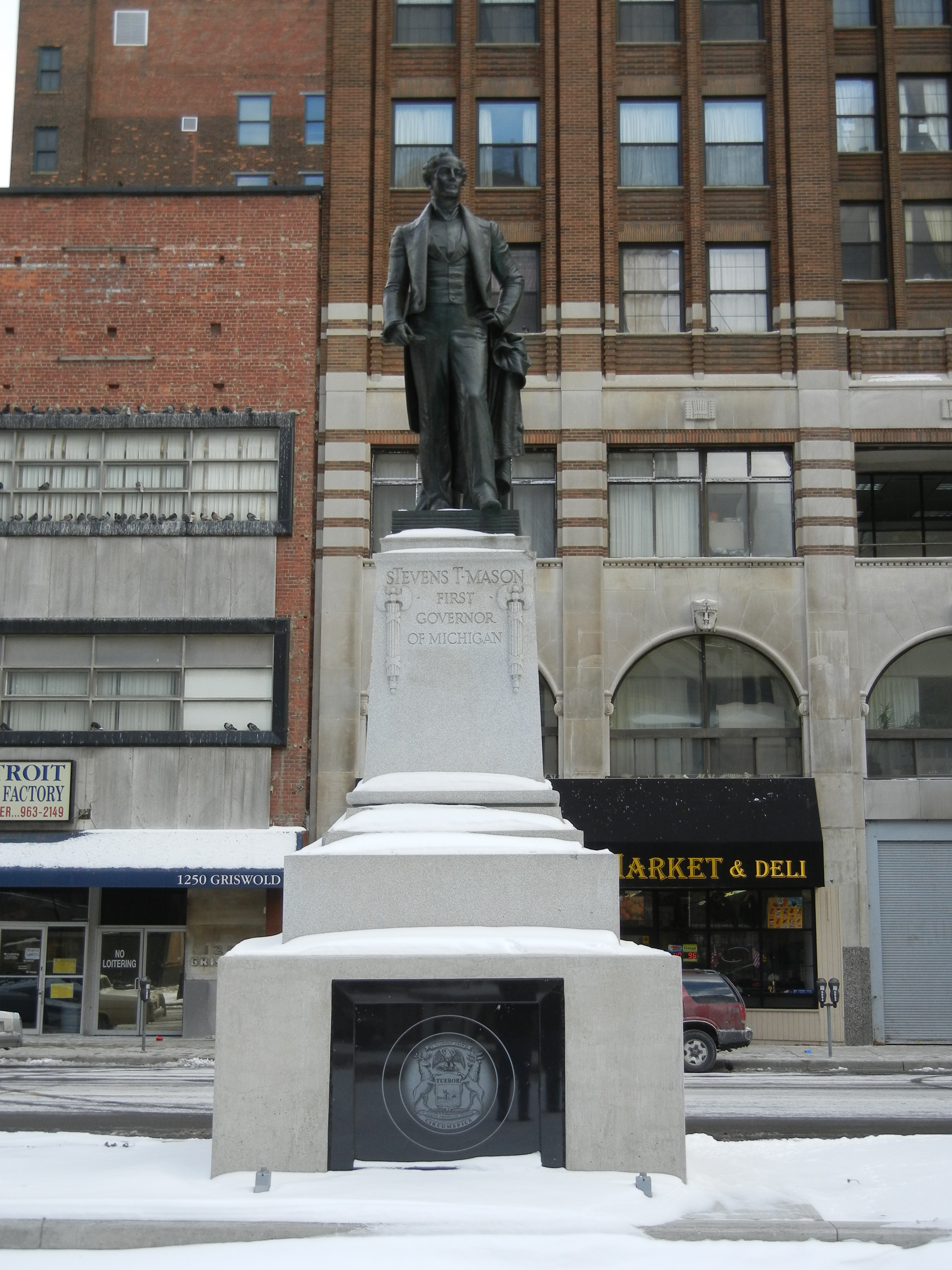
Stevens T. Mason Monument in 2011

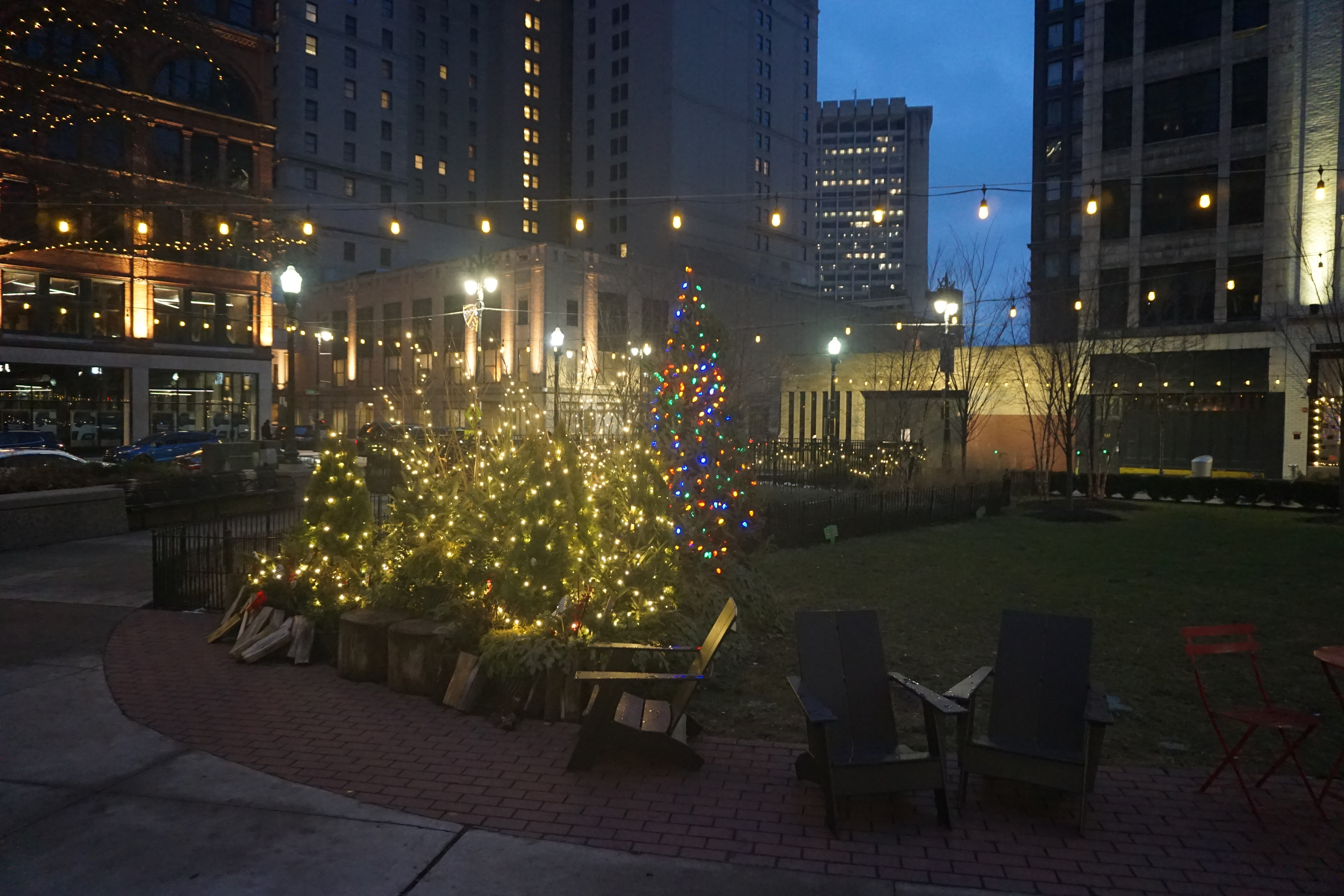
Capitol Park at night

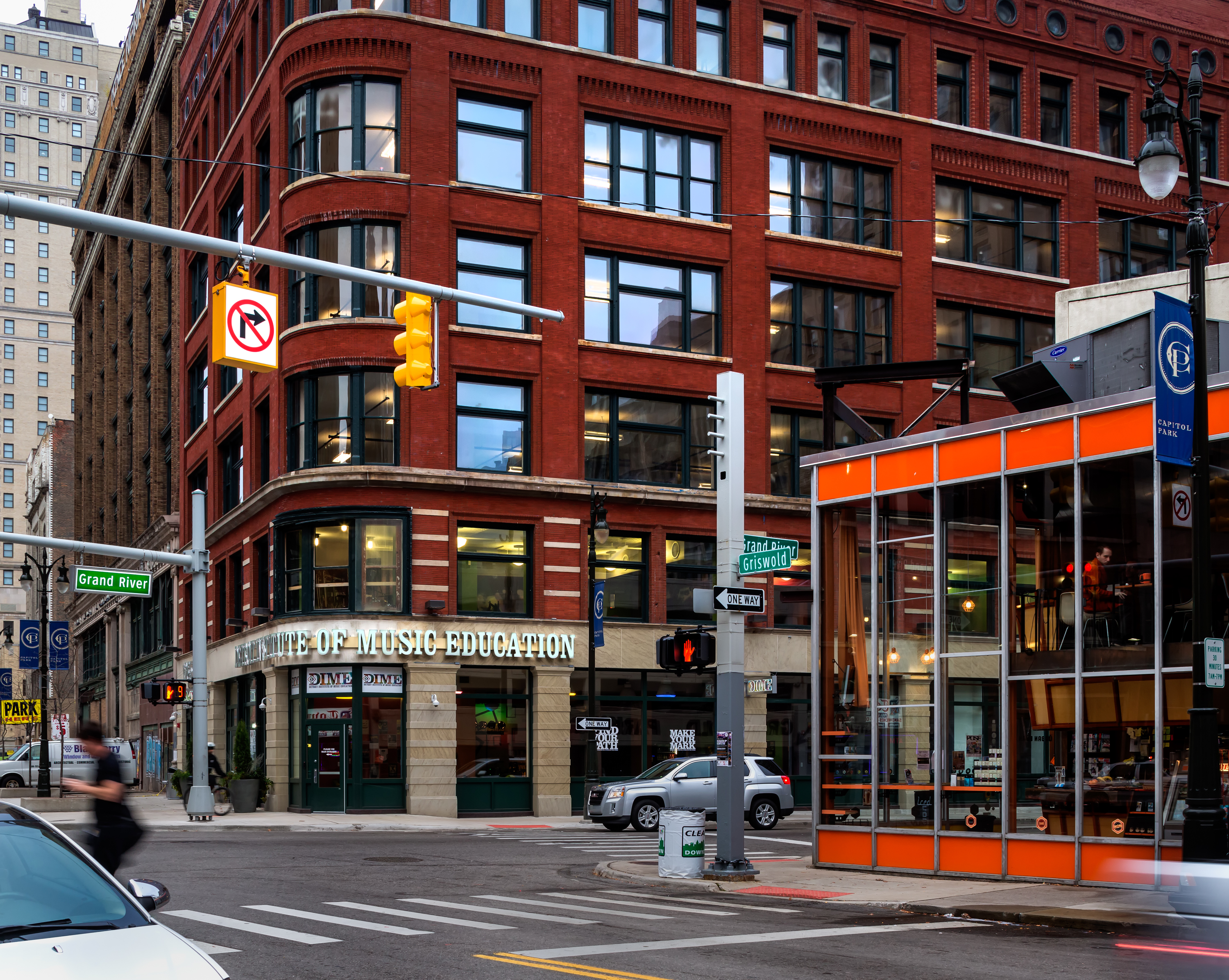
The Detroit Institute of Music Education (DIME) and Urban Bean at Grand River and Griswold St in Capitol Park
