= 1001 Woodward =

Skyscraper in Detroit, Michigan, United States

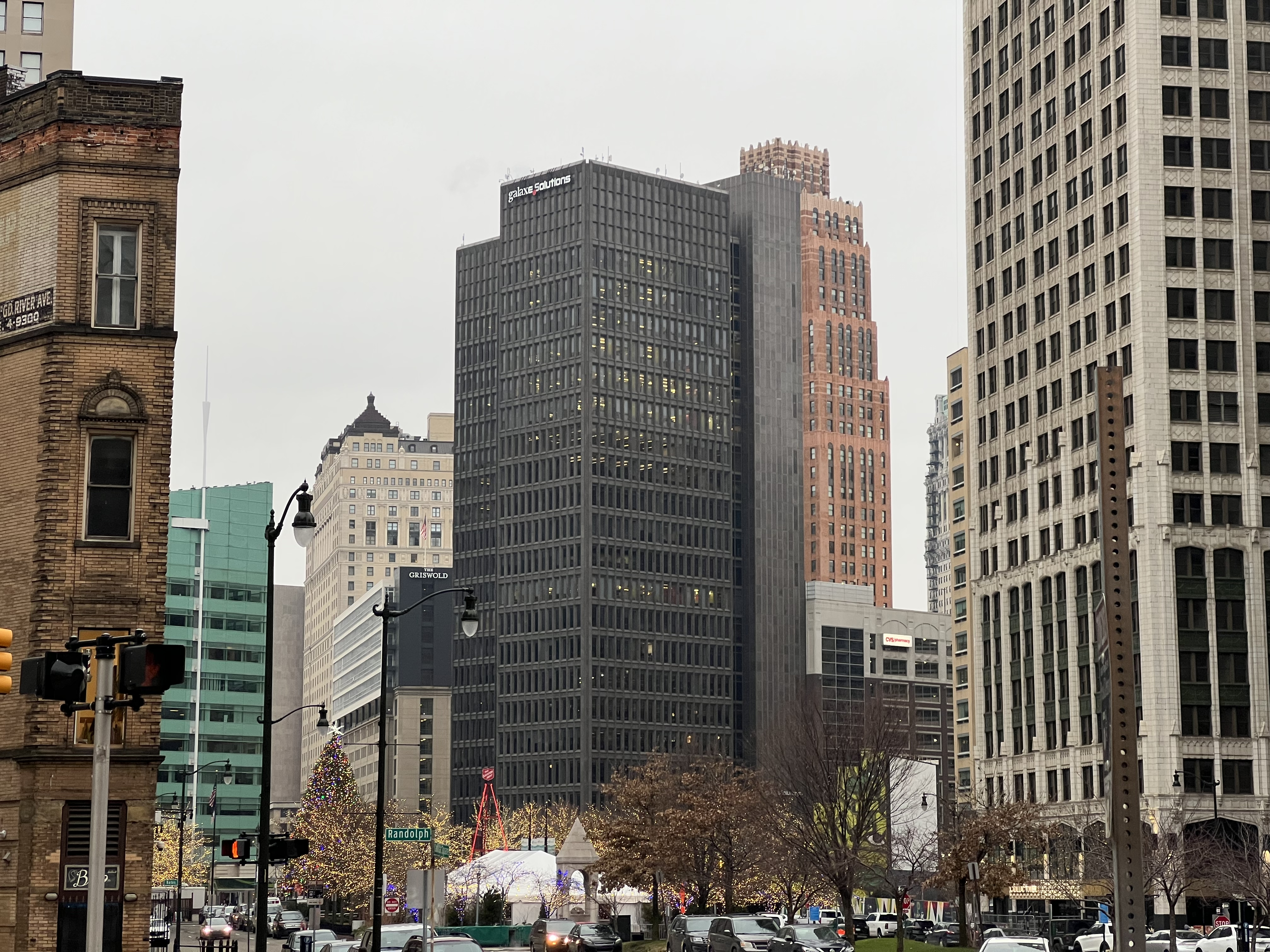
- Interactive map of the 1001 Woodward area

General information
- Type: Office
- Location: 1001 Woodward Avenue; Detroit, Michigan
- Coordinates: 42.3324°N 83.0476°W
- Construction started: 1963
- Completed: 1965
- Owner: Bedrock Detroit

Height
- Roof: 338 ft (103 m)

Technical details
- Floor count: 25
- Floor area: 290,000 sq ft (27,000 m^{2})

Design and construction
- Architect: Smith, Hinchman & Grylls

Other information
- Public transit: Cadillac Center; Campus Martius
- First Federal Building
- U.S. National Register of Historic Places
- NRHP reference No.: 13000906
- Added to NRHP: December 11, 2013

1001 Woodward is a 25-floor office building in Downtown Detroit, Michigan. It replaced the Majestic Building, a 14-story high rise on the same site. The building is located just south of the neighboring David Stott Building, at the corner of Woodward Avenue and Michigan Avenue overlooking Campus Martius Park. Constructed from 1963 to 1965, the building is designed in the International Style. It was listed on the National Register of Historic Places in 2013.

== History ==
The building occupies the site of the Majestic Building, which was demolished in 1962 to make way for 1001 Woodward. It was constructed between 1963 and 1965 to house headquarters for First Federal Savings and Loan of Detroit, and was known as the First Federal Building. By January 1998, the Savings and Loan was part of Charter One Financial and the parent company sought to sell the structure and lease a portion back. In December of that year, it was purchased by a partnership of The Carpenters Pension Trust Fund-Detroit & Vicinity and the Operating Engineers Local 324 Pension Fund for $6.5 million. As part of the sale, Charter One leased the ground floor, two office floors and the basement. The Michigan Court of Appeals occupied two floors under a lease which ended in 2001. The court relocated to Cadillac Place with several other State of Michigan offices.

In March 1999, the pension fund partnership announced a $15 million renovation of the building and a new name, Woodward Plaza. They also planned to convert the upper floors to luxury condominiums.

The pension fund partnership sold the building to Sky Development in April 1994 after spending $20 million on renovations. Sky Development also purchased an adjacent parcel behind the building to construct a parking garage.

Sky Development continued the pension funds' plan to convert part of the building into 144 residential units, however this plan collapsed at the end of 2007 and ownership reverted to the pension funds. The building and adjacent parking garage were subsequently purchased by Greektown business owner Dimitrios Papas in January 2008 and renovations were completed. In May 2010, GalaxE Solutions systems signed a lease for 28,000 square feet (2,600 m^{2}) bringing the occupancy to 25 percent. In September 2010, GalaxE leased an additional 12,000 square feet (1,100 m^{2}).

In March 2013, Rock Ventures, the umbrella company of Dan Gilbert's business including Quicken Loans, announced its purchase of the building. Quicken Loans subsequently moved its mortgage servicing group into the top four floors.

The building was listed on the National Register of Historic Places on December 11, 2013. It was nominated under Criterion A for its role in a 1950–1960s building boom and Criterion C for its architectural significance.

== Architecture ==
The building was designed by Smith, Hinchman & Grylls in the International Style. The exterior façade is composed of tinted windows set precast frames covered with charcoal-gray granite. The frames project from the façade creating a grid design similar to nearby 211 West Fort Street. The structure is composed of two rectangular towers set at a right-angle and joined by an elevator-utility core covered in glass and matching gray granite. This arrangement of the towers help it make the best use of its irregularly shaped lot. Floors 24 and 25 house mechanical equipment and the two-story ground floor originally housed a banking room and convenience store. The floors and interior lobby walls were originally faced with white marble.

In 1967, the building's architectural firm received an Honor Award from the American Institute of Architects for the design.

== Education ==
The lofts are zoned to Detroit Public Schools

- Burton International School (K-8)
- Martin Luther King High School.
- Previously: Murray-Wright High School

== See also ==
- National Register of Historic Places listings in Downtown and Midtown Detroit, Michigan
- List of tallest buildings in Detroit
