= Ford Building (Detroit) =

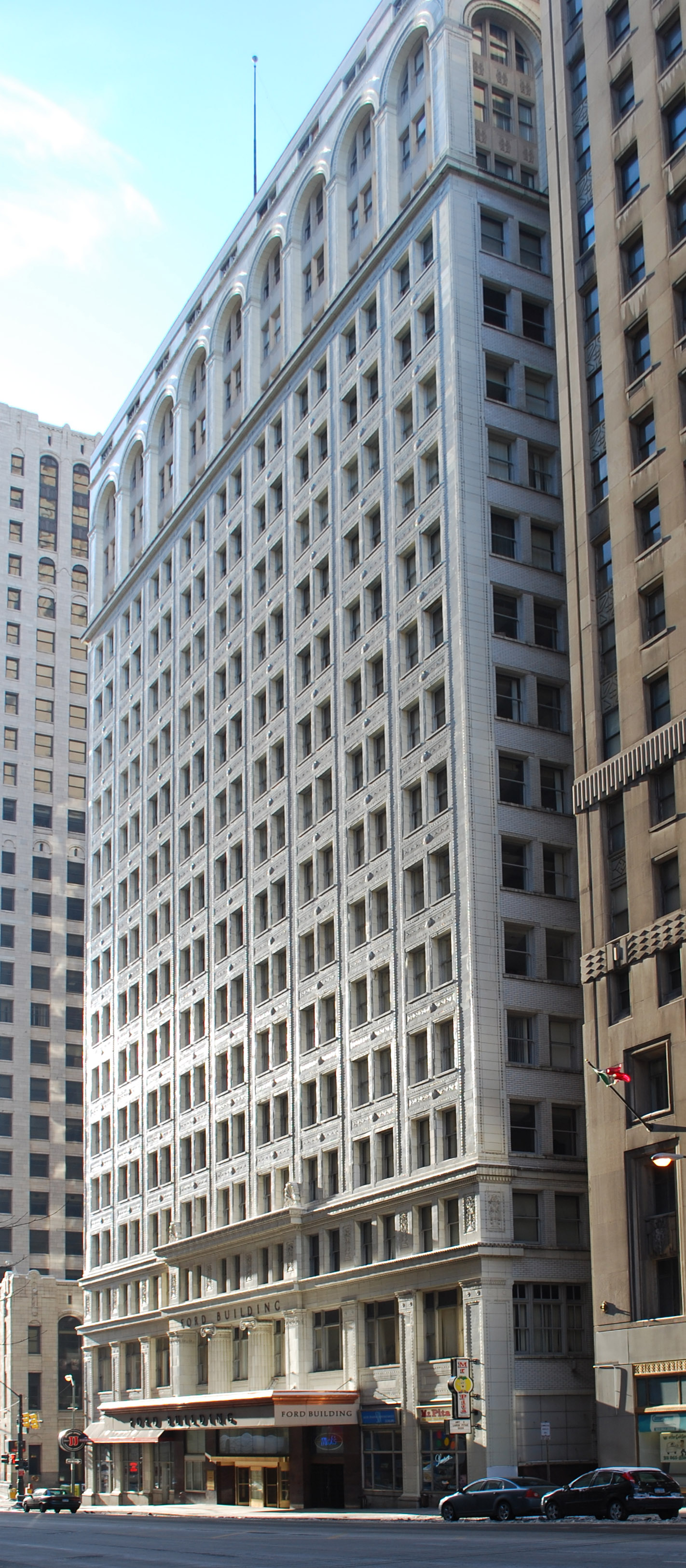
- Interactive map of the Ford Building area

General information
- Type: Commercial offices
- Location: 615 Griswold Street; Detroit, Michigan
- Coordinates: 42.3293°N 83.0464°W
- Construction started: 1907
- Completed: 1908

Height
- Roof: 83.82 m (275.0 ft)

Technical details
- Floor count: above ground: 19 below ground: 2
- Floor area: 202,686 sq ft (18,830.1 m^{2})
- Lifts/elevators: 6

Design and construction
- Architect: Daniel Burnham
- Ford Building
- U.S. Historic district – Contributing property
- Architectural style: Neo-Classical and Neo-Renaissance
- Part of: Detroit Financial District (ID09001067)
- Designated CP: December 14, 2009

The Ford Building is a high-rise office building located at 615 Griswold Street in Downtown Detroit, Michigan. It stands at the northwest corner of Congress and Griswold Streets, in the heart of Detroit's Financial District. The Penobscot Building abuts the building to the north, and the Guardian Building is southeast across Griswold Street.

Toledo, Ohio, glass manufacturer Edward Ford and his son, John B. Ford, general manager of the Fords' Wyandotte, Michigan, alkali plant, had this building—then Detroit's tallest—constructed as an investment property.

== Architecture ==
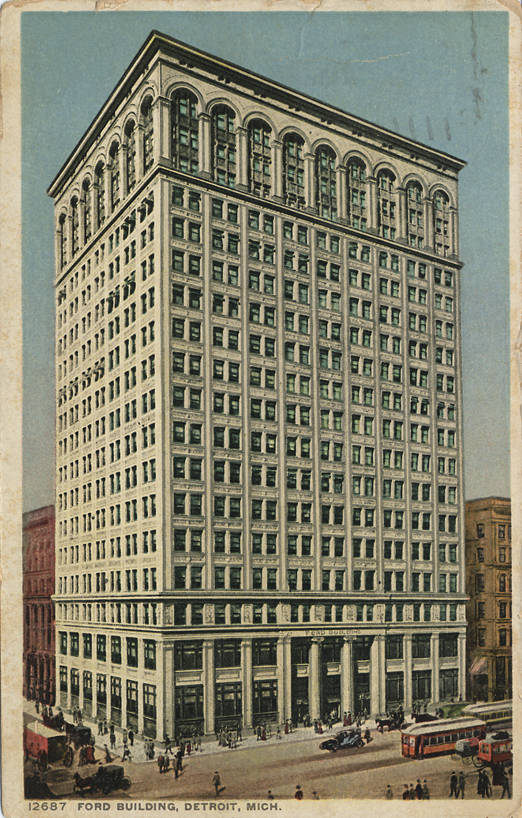
Ford Building, circa 1900s

Designed by Daniel Burnham, the building began construction in 1907 and was completed in 1908. It celebrated its 100th year in 2009, and was one of the first to use a steel structural support system. It stands at 23 stories in total height, with two basement floors, 19 above-ground floors, and two penthouses. It held the title as tallest building in Detroit from 1908 until 1913. The Ford Building's primary uses are for offices and retail. Burnham styled it with Neo-Classical and Neo-Renaissance elements. It is constructed with a steel skeleton faced with terra cotta tile and accented with white Italian marble. Burnham's other remaining skyscraper designs in Detroit include the David Whitney Building (1915) and the Dime Building (1912).

== See also ==
- Ford Building (San Diego, California)
