= List of tallest buildings in Detroit =

Skyline of Detroit
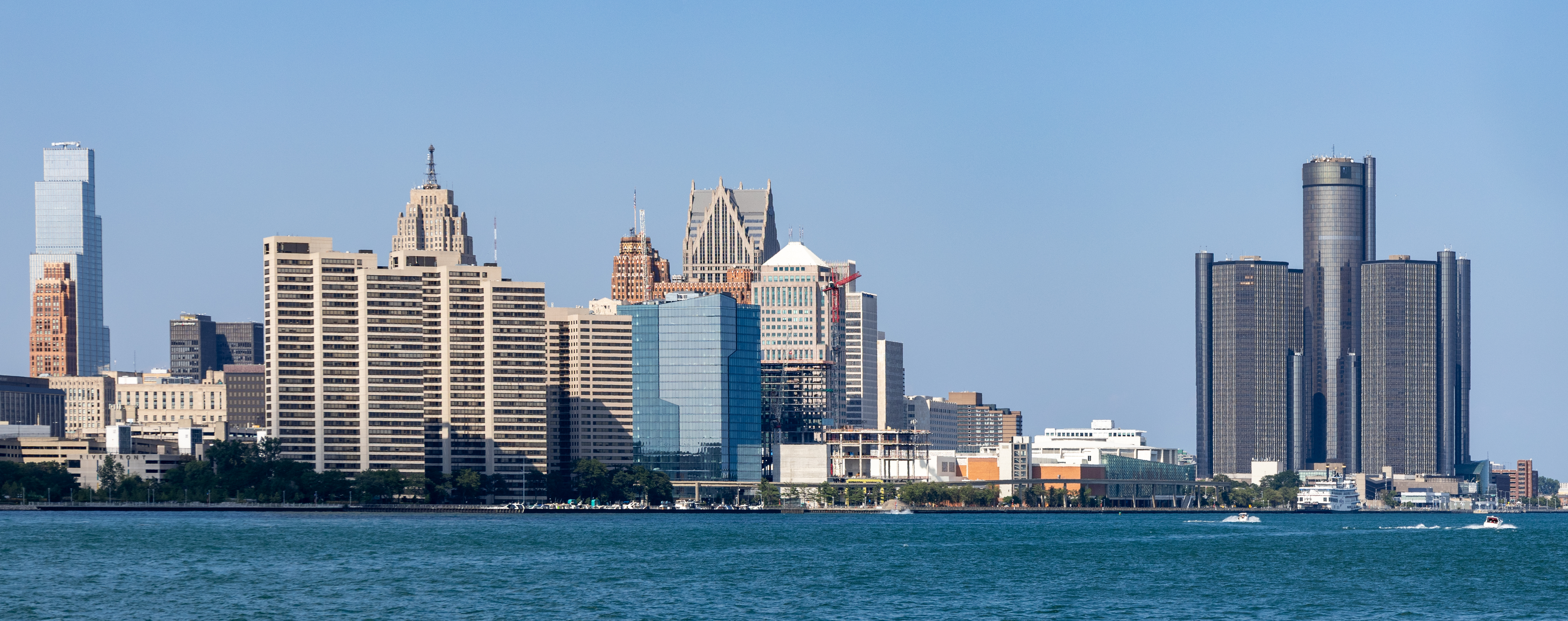
- Downtown Detroit from the Detroit River in 2025
- Tallest building: Detroit Marriott at the Renaissance Center (1977)
- Tallest building height: 727 ft (221.5 m)
- First 150 m+ building: Penobscot Building (1928)

Number of tall buildings (2026)
- Taller than 100 m (328 ft): 28
- Taller than 150 m (492 ft): 9
- Taller than 200 m (656 ft): 2

Number of tall buildings — feet
- Taller than 300 ft (91.4 m): 39

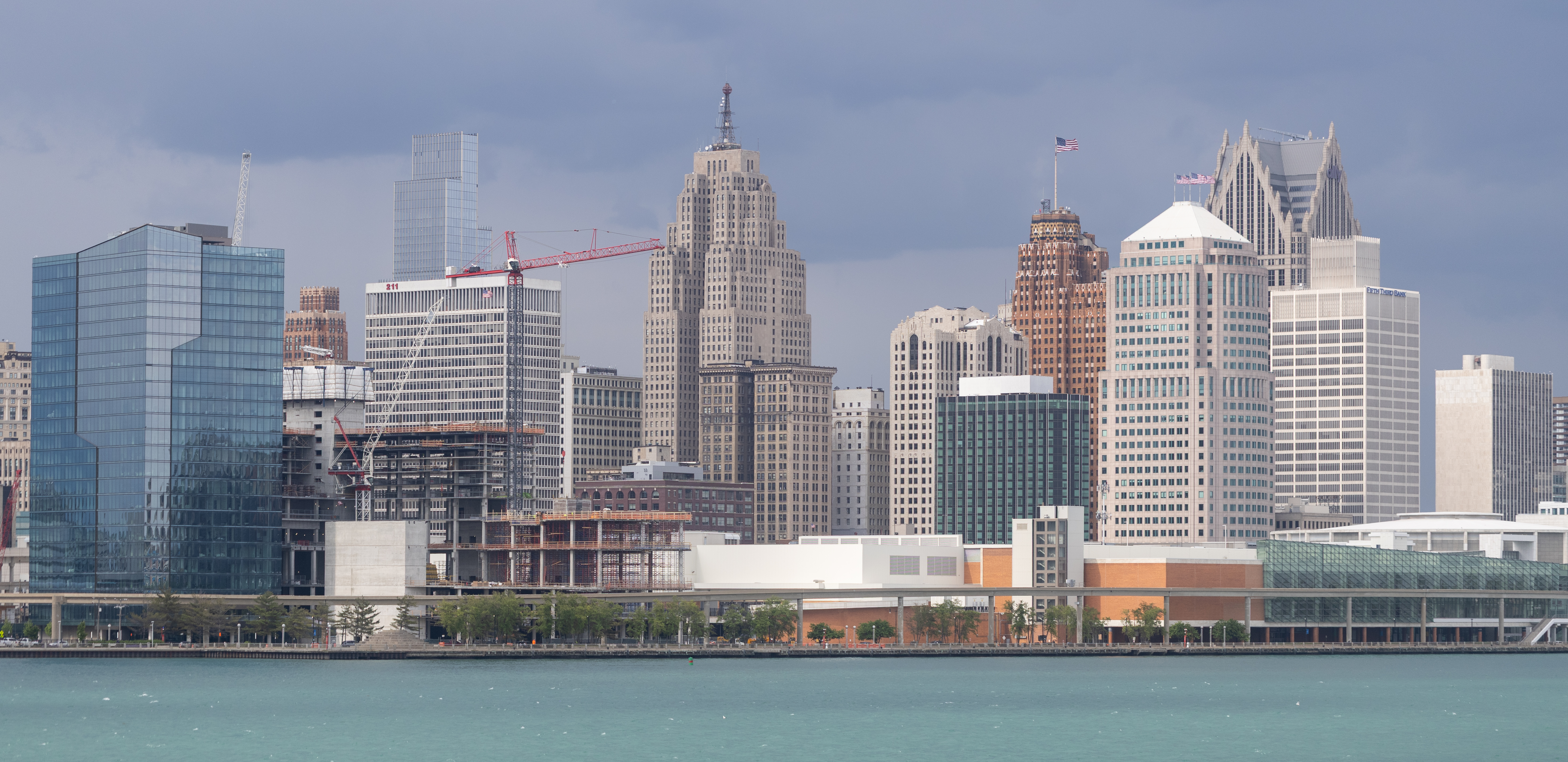
The Detroit Financial District in 2025

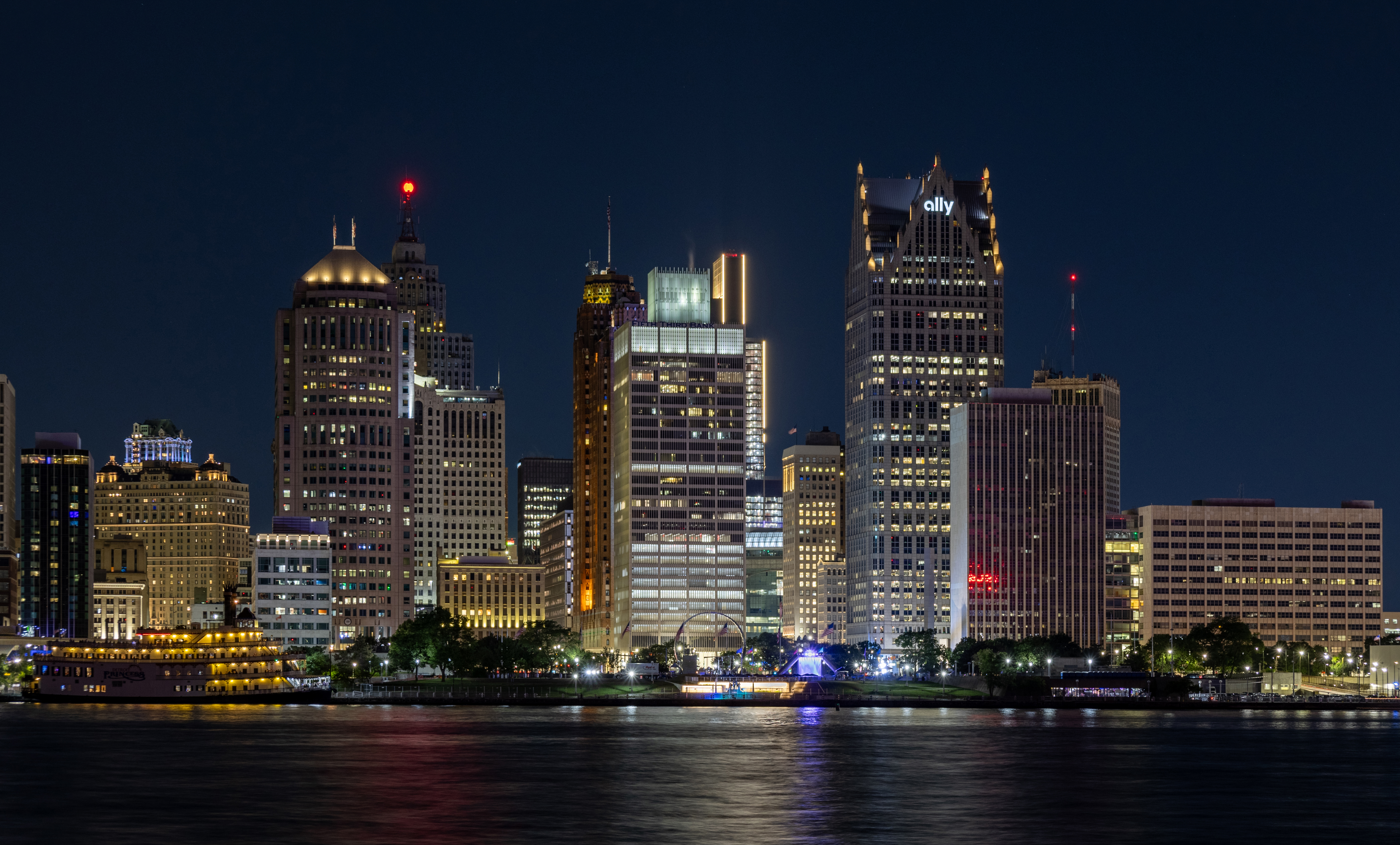
Downtown Detroit at night in 2025

Detroit is the largest city in the U.S state of Michigan, with a metropolitan area population of 4.4 million. As of 2026, Detroit is home to 39 buildings taller than 300 feet (91 m), nine of which are skyscrapers with a height of 492 ft (150 m) or more. Detroit has one of the largest skylines in the Midwestern United States, with the third most skyscrapers above 492 ft (150 m) in the region, after Chicago and Minneapolis. The tallest skyscraper in Detroit is the 70-story Detroit Marriott at the Renaissance Center, which rises 727 ft (221.5 m) along the Detroit International Riverfront in the city's downtown.^{[A]} The skyscraper is one of seven towers in the Renaissance Center complex, which served as the headquarters of General Motors from 1996 to 2026, reflecting the city's role in the automotive industry. The Detroit Marriott is the tallest building in Michigan and was the tallest hotel building in the world upon completion in 1977; it is currently the second tallest in all of North America.

Detroit's history of skyscrapers began in 1889, with completion of the historic 10-story Hammond Building—considered the city's first steel-framed skyscraper. Detroit grew to become the fourth-largest city in the United States by the 1920s, and witnessed a massive building boom during the Roaring Twenties. Many ornate skyscrapers were built during this period, including the Penobscot, Guardian, Fisher, Buhl, and David Stott buildings. This resulted in Detroit having one of the world's largest skylines at the time outside of New York City and Chicago. By 1930, the city had thirteen 300-foot buildings. The Great Depression brought an end to the boom.

Deindustrialization and suburbanization affected Detroit in the second half of the 20th century, as the city's population peaked in the 1950 census and subsequently declined. Despite this, a further 21 buildings taller than 300 ft (91 m) were completed from 1960 to 1991. This included the postmodern Ally Detroit Center, Detroit's third-tallest building, and the Renaissance Center (RenCen), which was developed as an urban renewal project aimed to address the city's decline. Downtown Detroit has been undergoing revitalization in the 21st century, bringing with it several significant restoration projects of old high-rises and several new ones. Hudson's Detroit, which includes the city's second tallest building at 680 feet (207 m), was completed in 2025. General Motors moved its headquarters from the RenCen to Hudson's Detroit in 2026.

Most of Detroit's tall buildings are located in the city's downtown, immediately north of the Detroit River, which separates Detroit from the downtown of the city of Windsor, Canada. The Detroit–Windsor transborder agglomeration is one of few locations where high-rises in two countries are visible together. Going northwards from downtown along Woodward Avenue, shorter high-rises are scattered in the neighborhoods of Midtown, Medical Center, and New Center. The Fisher Building in New Center is Detroit's 12th tallest building. Residential towers are also sparsely found near the riverfront, east of downtown. In Metro Detroit, the city of Southfield contains a small high-rise cluster in Southfield Town Center, with a small number of towers in Pontiac and Troy. Ford and Chrysler, the rest of the Big Three automobile manufacturers, are headquartered in high-rises in the cities of Dearborn and Auburn Hills, respectively.

== History ==
Detroit's history of skyscrapers began in 1889, with completion of the historic 10-story Hammond Building—considered the city's first steel-framed skyscraper. It was followed by the Savings Bank Building in 1895, the Majestic Building in 1896, and the Union Trust Building in 1896.

Deindustrialization and suburbanization affected the growth of Detroit's skyline in the second half of the 20th century, as the city's population peaked in the 1950 census and subsequently declined. Despite this, a further 21 buildings taller than 300 ft (91 m) were completed from 1960 to 1991. This included the postmodern Ally Detroit Center, Detroit's third-tallest building, and the Renaissance Center (RenCen), which was developed as an urban renewal project aimed to address the city's decline. The five original towers, completed in 1977, make up five of the nine skyscrapers taller than 492 ft (150 m) in Detroit. Two shorter towers were added in 1981.

Downtown Detroit has been undergoing revitalization in the 21st century, bringing with it many significant restoration projects, such as that of the Westin Book Cadillac Hotel. New high-rises include Hollywood Casino at Greektown, a casino hotel, in 2009, and eXchange, the first high-rise in the U.S to be constructed using a "top-down" method, in 2023. Hudson's Detroit, the city's second tallest building, was completed in 2025. General Motors moved headquarters from the RenCen to Hudson's Detroit in 2026, leaving two of the skyscrapers at RenCen at risk of demolition.

Number of buildings by height in Detroit by the end of each year, based on the information in this article. Click on the legend to toggle a specific height on or off. View chart definition.

== Cityscape ==
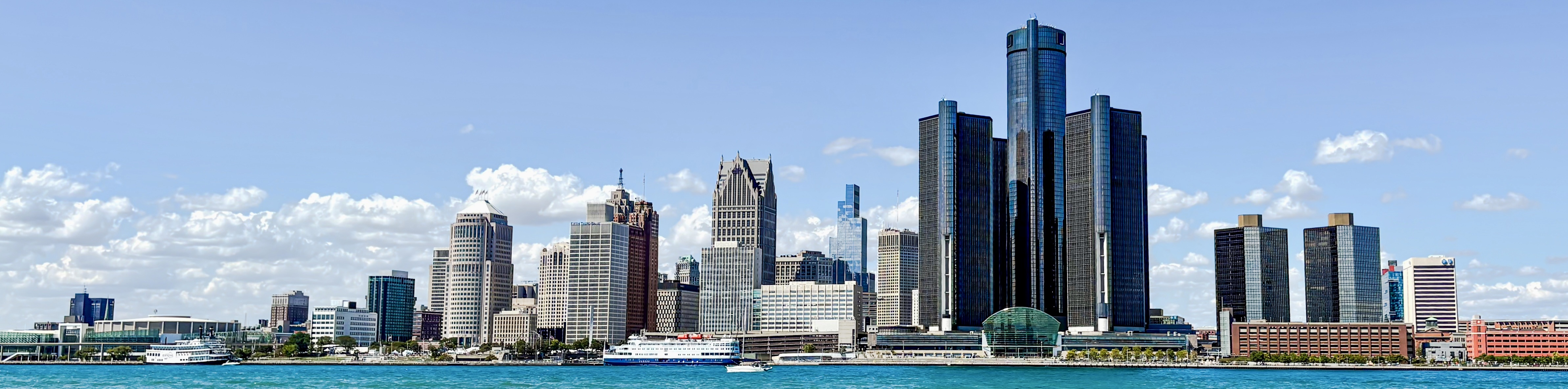
The Detroit skyline from Windsor in 2025 (Click or hover over image to identify buildings)

== Map of tallest buildings ==
Buildings taller than 300 feet (91 m) are concentrated in Downtown Detroit with only two that are found outside this area: The Fisher Building, and Jeffersonian Apartments.

Buildings taller than 300 feet (91 m) in Downtown Detroit. An asterisk (*) next to the building's name indicates it is located outside the map. Each marker is numbered by the building's height rank, and colored by the decade of its completion.
- 1950s and before
- 1960s
- 1970s
- 1980s
- 1990s
- 2000s
- 2010s
- 2020s
1 Detroit Marriott at the Renaissance Center
2 Hudson's Tower
3 Ally Detroit Center
4 Penobscot Building
5 RenCen Tower 100
6 RenCen Tower 200
7 RenCen Tower 300
8 RenCen Tower 400
9 Guardian Building
10 Book Tower
11 150 West Jefferson
12 Fisher Building*
13 Cadillac Tower
14 David Stott Building
15 One Woodward Avenue
16 Patrick V. McNamara Federal Building
17 DTE Energy Headquarters
18 David Broderick Tower
19 211 West Fort Street
20 Buhl Building
21 Westin Book Cadillac Hotel
22 Hollywood Casino at Greektown
23 First National Building
24 AT&T Building
25 RenCen Tower 500
26 RenCen Tower 600
27 1001 Woodward
28 Renaissance City Apartments
29 AT&T Building Addition
30 Chrysler House
31 Coleman A. Young Municipal Center
32 Huntington Bank Tower
33 Penobscot Building Annex
34 1300 Lafayette East Cooperative
35 Blue Cross Blue Shield of Michigan Building
36 Jeffersonian Apartments*
37 Riverfront Tower 200
38 Riverfront Tower 300
39 The Residences Water Square

== Tallest buildings ==
This list ranks completed buildings in Detroit that stand at least 300 ft (91 m) tall as of 2026, based on standard height measurement. This includes spires and architectural details but does not include antenna masts. The “Year” column indicates the year of completion. Buildings tied in height are sorted by year of completion with earlier buildings ranked first, and then alphabetically.

Was the tallest building in Detroit upon completion

Rank	Name	Image	Location	Height ft (m)	Floors	Year	Purpose	Notes
1	Detroit Marriott at the Renaissance Center		42°19′44″N 83°02′23″W	727 (221.5)	70^{[A]}	1976	Hotel	Tallest building in the city and the state since 1976, 161st-tallest building in the United States. Tallest hotel in the world upon completion; now stands as the second tallest hotel in the Western Hemisphere. Major renovation completed in 2004. The entire complex is owned by General Motors.
2	Hudson’s Tower		42°20′00″N 83°02′51″W	680 (207.3)	49	2025	Mixed-use	Tallest building completed in Detroit in the 2020s. Mixed-use residential and hotel building. Designed by SHoP Architects.
3	Ally Detroit Center		42°19′48″N 83°02′41″W	619 (188.7)	43	1991	Office	Formerly known as One Detroit Center. Tallest building completed in Detroit in the 1990s. Former headquarters of Comerica Bank, current headquarters of Ally Financial. Designed by American architects Philip Johnson and John Burgee.
4	Penobscot Building		42°19′49″N 83°02′51″W	569 (173.3)	47	1927	Office	When completed in 1927, the Penobscot was the world's eighth tallest building. It was the city's tallest from 1927 to 1976. The Penobscot stands at the center of the Detroit Financial District. Designed by local American architect Wirt C. Rowland.
5	Renaissance Center Tower 100		42°19′45″N 83°02′26″W	509 (155)	39	1976	Office	Part of the Renaissance Center. One of four identically tall buildings surrounding Detroit Marriot at the Renaissance Center.
6	Renaissance Center Tower 200		42°19′47″N 83°02′22″W	509 (155)	39	1976	Office	Part of the Renaissance Center. One of four identically tall buildings surrounding Detroit Marriot at the Renaissance Center.
7	Renaissance Center Tower 300		42°19′44″N 83°02′20″W	509 (155)	39	1976	Office	Part of the Renaissance Center. One of four identically tall buildings surrounding Detroit Marriot at the Renaissance Center.
8	Renaissance Center Tower 400		42°19′42″N 83°02′24″W	509 (155)	39	1976	Office	Part of the Renaissance Center. One of four identically tall buildings surrounding Detroit Marriot at the Renaissance Center.
9	Guardian Building		42°19′47″N 83°02′46″W	495 (151)	40	1929	Office	
10	Book Tower		42°20′01″N 83°03′05″W	461 (140.4)	38	1926	Mixed-use	Originally an office building. The Book Tower and the adjoining 13-story Book Building underwent a nearly $400 million renovation, re-opening in 2023 as a mixed residential and retail/office space.
11	150 West Jefferson		42°19′42″N 83°02′48″W	455 (138.7)	26	1988	Office	Tallest building completed in Detroit in the 1980s. Previously known as the Madden Building. Designed by Heller Manus Architects.
12	Fisher Building		42°22′10″N 83°04′37″W	445 (135.5)	30	1928	Office	Designed by Albert Kahn Associates.
13	Cadillac Tower		42°19′55″N 83°02′41″W	437 (133.2)	40	1927	Office	
14	David Stott Building		42°19′57″N 83°02′55″W	437 (133.2)	38	1929	MIxed-use	Designed by John M. Donaldson. Converted to a mixed-use office and residential building from 2015 to 2018.
15	One Woodward Avenue		42°19′44″N 83°02′43″W	430 (131.1)	28	1962	Office	Tallest building completed in the city in the 1960s.
16	Patrick V. McNamara Federal Building		42°19′52″N 83°03′11″W	393 (119.8)	27	1976	Government	Designed by architects Smith, Hinchman & Grylls. Tallest government building in Detroit.
17	DTE Energy Headquarters		42°20′01″N 83°03′28″W	374 (114)	25	1971	Office	Designed by Hungarian-American architect Emery Roth.
18	David Broderick Tower		42°20′09″N 83°02′59″W	369 (112.6)	35	1928	Residential	Fully renovated in 2012 as a mixed-use, primarily residential building. The project created residential units on floors 5-34, with the lower 4 floors dedicated to retail, entertainment, and office space. Originally known as the Eaton Tower.
19	211 West Fort Street		42°19′46″N 83°02′57″W	368 (112.1)	27	1963	Office	Designed by Harley, Ellington, Cowin & Stirton.
20	Buhl Building		42°19′46″N 83°02′49″W	366 (111.6)	29	1925	Office	Designed by local American architect Wirt C. Rowland.
21	Westin Book Cadillac Hotel		42°19′55″N 83°03′01″W	349 (106.4)	31	1924	Mixed-use	Originally known as the Book-Cadillac Hotel, it was the tallest hotel in the world upon completion in 1924. Closed in 1984 due to financial issues. The hotel was restored and reopened in 2008, with some space being converted to residential use.
22	Hollywood Casino at Greektown		42°20′10″N 83°02′27″W	348 (106.1)	30	2009	Hotel	Tallest building completed in Detroit in the 2000s. Designed by Paul Curtis Steelman and GINO Rossetti.
23	First National Building		42°19′52″N 83°02′43″W	341 (103.9)	26	1929	Office	Tallest building completed in Detroit in the 1930s. Designed by Albert Khan.
24	AT&T Building		42°19′57″N 83°03′13″W	340 (103.6)	20	1927	Office	
25	Renaissance Center Tower 500		42°19′48″N 83°02′19″W	339 (103.4)	21	1981	Office	
26	Renaissance Center Tower 600		42°19′49″N 83°02′17″W	339 (103.4)	21	1981	Office	
27	1001 Woodward		42°19′55″N 83°02′51″W	338 (103)	23	1965	Office	
28	Renaissance City Apartments		42°19′53″N 83°02′32″W	332 (101.1)	33	1985	Residential	
29	AT&T Building Addition		42°19′55″N 83°03′13″W	327 (99.7)	17	1972	Office	
30	Chrysler House		42°19′51″N 83°02′54″W	323 (98.6)	23	1912	Office	
31	Coleman A. Young Municipal Center		42°19′46″N 83°02′38″W	317 (96.6)	19	1955	Office	Tallest building completed in the city in the 1950s.
32	Huntington Bank Tower		42°20′14″N 83°03′06″W	311 (95)	20	2021	Office	
33	Penobscot Building Annex		42°19′47″N 83°02′52″W	310 (94.5)	23	1916	Office	
34	1300 Lafayette East Cooperative		42°20′12″N 83°02′03″W	310 (94.5)	30	1964	Residential	
35	Blue Cross Blue Shield of Michigan Building		42°20′04″N 83°02′22″W	307 (93.6)	22	1971	Office	
36	Jeffersonian Apartments		42°21′24″N 82°59′10″W	305 (93)	30	1965	Residential	
37	Riverfront Tower 200		42°19′27″N 83°03′17″W	305 (92.9)	29	1983	Residential	
38	Riverfront Tower 300		42°19′26″N 83°03′21″W	305 (92.9)	29	1982	Residential	
39	The Residences Water Square		42°19′30″N 83°03′07″W	300 (91) (Note: This height is an estimated figure.)	25	2024	Residential	

== Tallest buildings in Metro Detroit ==
Metro Detroit
- Population: 4,392,041 (2020 census)
- Cities included: Detroit, Southfield, Troy

Number of tall buildings (2026)
- Taller than 100 m (328 ft): 34
- Taller than 150 m (492 ft): 9
- Taller than 200 m (656 ft): 2

Number of tall buildings — feet
- Taller than 300 ft (91.4 m): 45

There are six buildings in Detroit's suburban municipalities that stand at least 300 feet (91 m) tall, based on standard height measurement: five in Southfield, and one in Troy.

Rank	Name	Image	City	Height ft (m)	Floors	Year	Purpose	Notes
1	3000 Town Center		Southfield 42°28′41″N 83°14′46″W	402 (122.4)	32	1975	Office	Tallest building in Southfield. 15th tallest building in Metro Detroit.
2	1000 Town Center		Southfield 42°28′31″N 83°14′36″W	395 (120.4)	28	1989	Office	
3	2000 Town Center		Southfield 42°28′37″N 83°14′44″W	370 (112.9)	28	1986	Office	
4	PNC Center		Troy 42°33′37″N 83°09′39″W	346 (105.6)	25	1975	Office	Tallest building in Troy.
5	American Center		Southfield 42°29′24″N 83°17′58″W	331 (100.9)	25	1975	Office	
6	5000 Town Center		Southfield 42°28′46″N 83°14′33″W	328 (100)	33	1983	Residential	

== Tallest under construction ==
There are two buildings under construction in Detroit that are planned to be at least 300 ft (91 m) tall as of 2026, based on standard height measurement.

Name	Height ft (m)	Floors	Year	Notes
Henry Ford Hospital Tower	376 (115)	21	2029	Height according to the FAA obstruction evaluation report
JW Marriott Detroit	302 (92)	25	2027	

== Tallest demolished ==
The tallest building ever demolished in Detroit was the J. L. Hudson Department Store and Addition.

Name	Image	Height ft (m)	Floors	Year completed	Year demolished	Notes
J. L. Hudson Department Store and Addition		410 (125)	29	1946	1998	Opening in 1911, the building was constructed in phases between 1911 and 1946. It was demolished in 1998, and is now the site of Hudson's Detroit.

== Timeline of tallest buildings ==
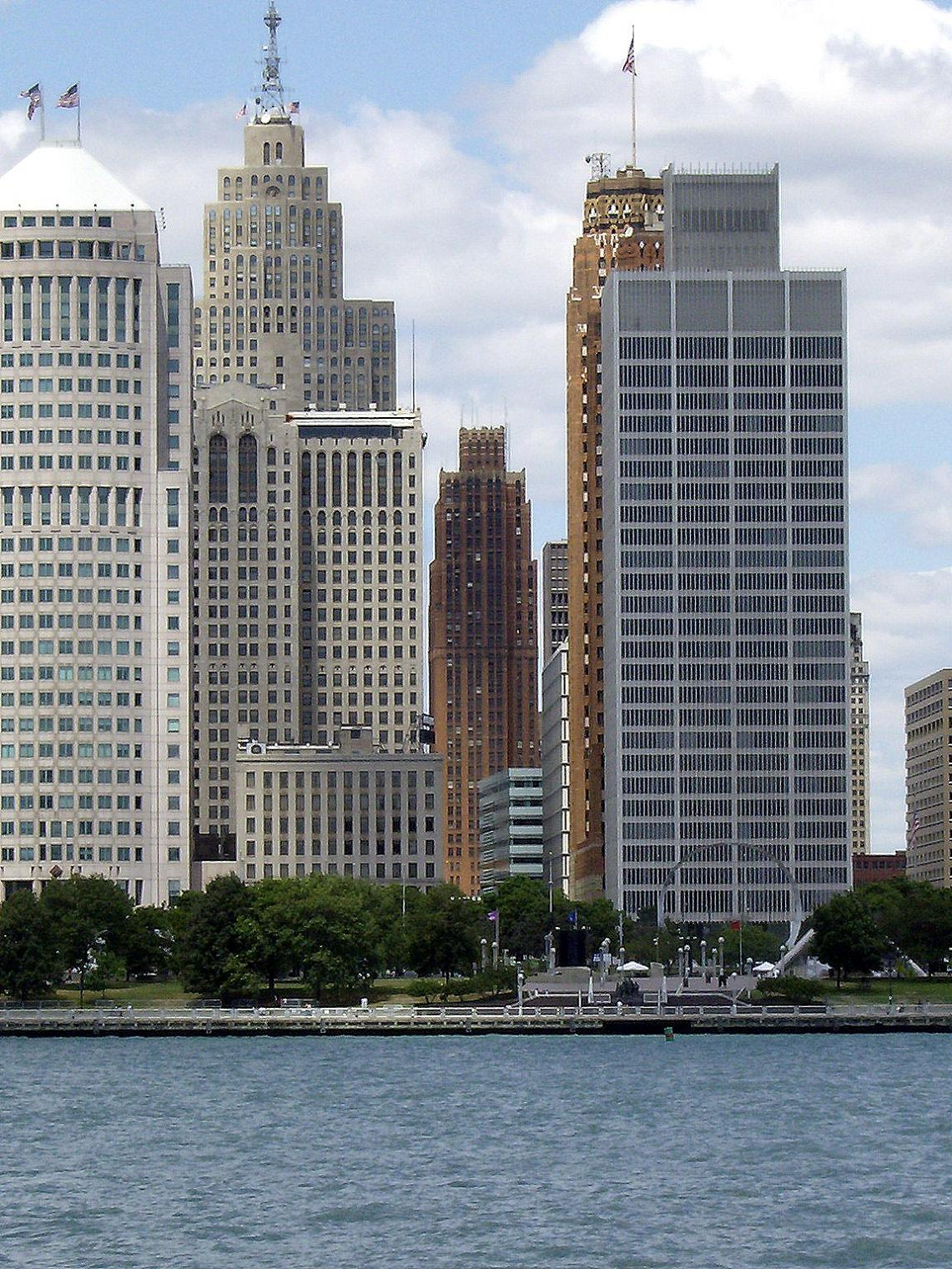
The Penobscot Building in 2007; it was the tallest building in Detroit from 1928 to 1977

For most of Detroit's earlier years, the tallest buildings in the city were churches and government buildings with their steeples. The first skyscraper in the city is usually considered the Hammond Building, completed in 1889. However, since the 10-story building did not surpass the steeple of the Fort Street Presbyterian Church, it never became a city record holder. The first skyscraper to have the distinction of being Detroit's tallest building was the Ford Building, completed in 1909.

Name	Image	Street address	Years as tallest	Height ft (m)	Floors	Reference
First Michigan State Capitol^{[C]}		Capitol Park	1828–1866	140 (43)	2	
Most Holy Trinity Church		1050 Porter Street	1865–1871	170 (52)	1	
Former Detroit City Hall^{[D]}^{[E]}		Campus Martius Park	1871–1872	200 (61)	4	
St. Joseph Church^{[E]}		1828 Jay Street	1872–1876	200 (61)	1	
Fort Street Presbyterian Church		631 West Fort Street	1876–1908	265 (81)	1	
Ford Building		615 Griswold Street	1908–1912	275 (84)	19	
Chrysler House		719 Griswold Street	1912–1924	324 (99)	23	
Book Cadillac Hotel^{[F]}		220 Michigan Avenue	1924–1925	349 (106)	29	
Buhl Building		535 Griswold Street	1925–1926	366 (112)	29	
Book Tower		1265 Washington Boulevard	1926–1927	475 (145)	38	
Penobscot Building		633 Griswold Street	1927–1976	565 (172)	47	
Detroit Marriott at the Renaissance Center		1 Renaissance Center Drive	1976–present	727 (222)	70^{[A]}	

== Notes ==
A. ^ ^{a} ^{b} ^{c} General Motors, the owner of the Detroit Marriott at the Renaissance Center, maintains that the building has 73 floors. Hines Interests, the property management firm for the building, gives a floor count of 74, while architect Skidmore, Owings and Merrill gives a floor count of 75. The Council on Tall Buildings and Urban Habitat, Emporis, and other building database sites usually give the floor count as 70, while other sources state 73 stories. This table uses the floor count of 70, as stated officially by online building databases.
B. The capitol of Michigan was relocated to Lansing in 1847, and the original capitol building was destroyed in a fire in 1893.
C. This building was destroyed in 1961.
D. ^ ^{a} ^{b} St. Joseph Church, completed in 1873, tied the height of the Detroit City Hall. The city therefore had two tallest buildings for a period of 4 years, until the Fort Street Presbyterian Church was completed in 1877.
E. This building was constructed as the Book-Cadillac Hotel, but is now officially known as the Westin Book-Cadillac Hotel.
