= Ally Detroit Center =

Skyscraper in Detroit, Michigan

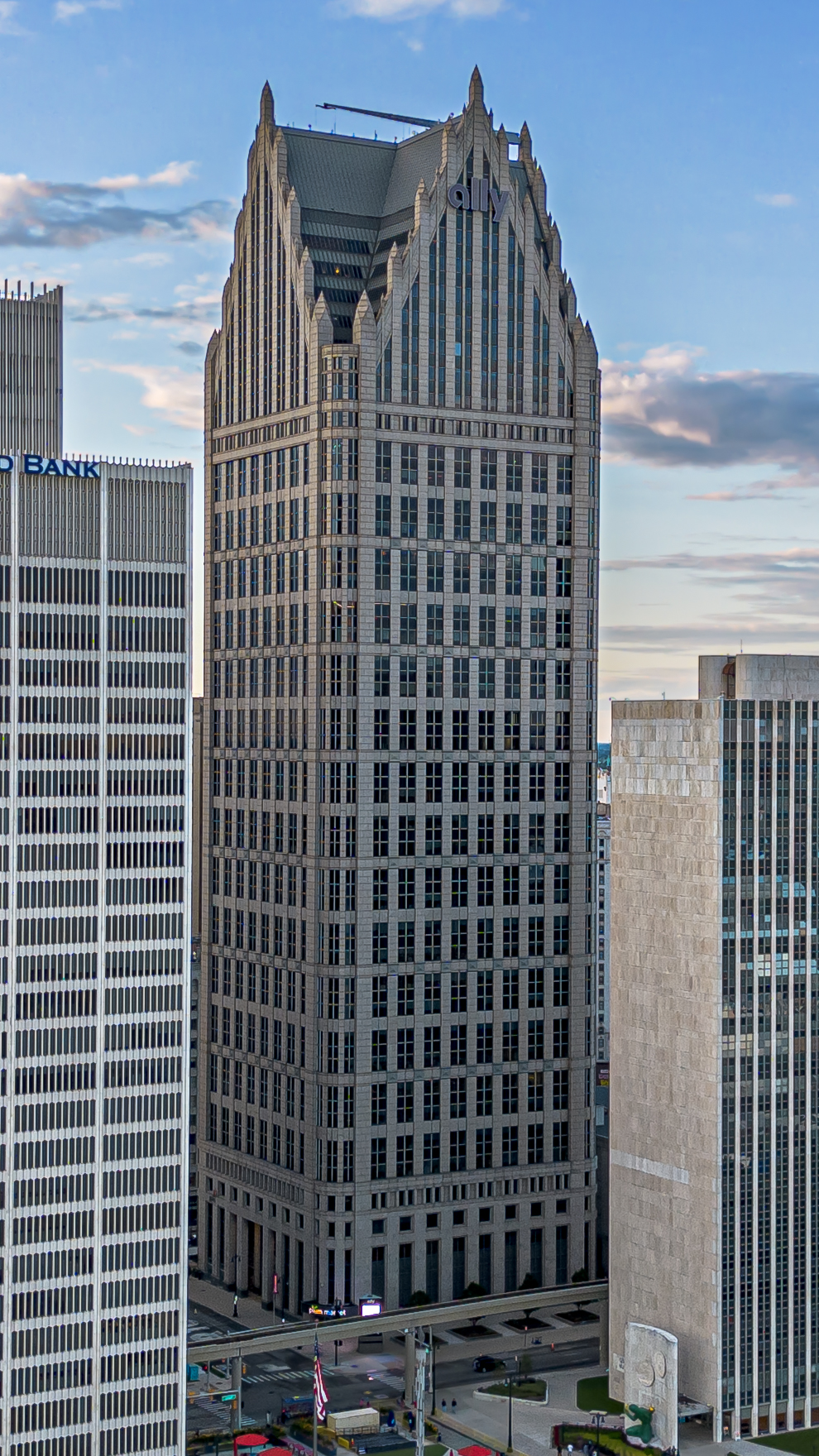
- Ally Detroit Center in 2025
- Interactive map of the Ally Detroit Center area
- Former names: One Detroit Center (1993–2015)
- Alternative names: Comerica Tower; 500 Woodward Avenue

General information
- Status: Completed
- Type: Commercial offices
- Architectural style: Postmodern
- Location: 500 Woodward Avenue; Detroit, Michigan
- Coordinates: 42.330°N 83.045°W
- Construction started: 1991
- Completed: 1993
- Owner: Bedrock Detroit

Height
- Antenna spire: 188.7 m (619 ft)
- Roof: 184.9 m (607 ft)
- Top floor: 176.2 m (578 ft)

Technical details
- Floor count: 43; 2 below ground
- Floor area: 1,674,700 sq ft (155,580 m^{2})
- Lifts/elevators: 22

Design and construction
- Architects: Philip Johnson; John Burgee
- Developer: Hines Interests
- Main contractor: Walbridge Aldinger Company

Other information
- Public transit: Financial District; Congress Street; DDOT 3, 5, 6, 9, 40, 52, 67; SMART FAST Michigan 261, Woodward 461, 462, Gratiot 561

Ally Detroit Center (formerly One Detroit Center) is a 43-story office skyscraper in downtown Detroit, Michigan, United States. Rising 619 feet (189 m), it is the third-tallest building in Detroit as well as in Michigan, behind the Renaissance Center and Hudson's Detroit. It has a floor area of 1,674,708 sq ft (155,585.5 m^{2}).

== Architecture ==
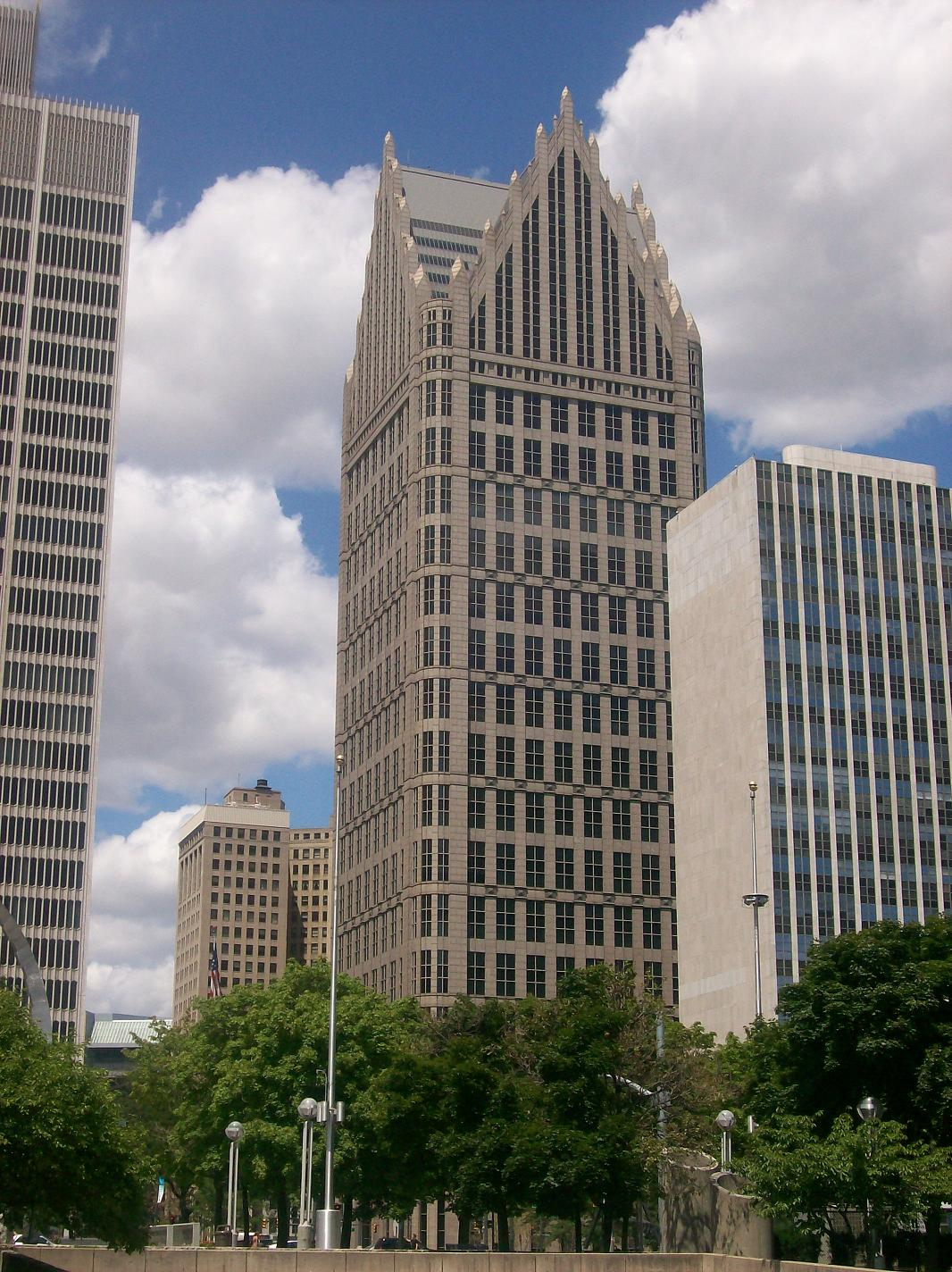
Ally Detroit Center from Jefferson Avenue

The building was designed by noted architects John Burgee and Philip Johnson, partners influential in postmodern architecture. Ally Detroit Center was constructed from 1991 to 1993. It houses numerous tenants, including many prominent Detroit law firms and PricewaterhouseCoopers. In addition to retail, the building also contains a restaurant and a gym.

The building is famous for its postmodern architectural design topped with Flemish-inspired neo-Gothic spires which blend architecturally with the city's historic skyline. It is constructed mainly of granite. Sometimes called a "twin gothic structure", for its pairs of spires, it is oriented North-South and East-West (as named on a plaque along the Windsor waterfront park). Ally Detroit Center won an Award of Excellence for its design in 1996. Ally Detroit Center replicas have become a souvenir item along with those of other Detroit skyscrapers.

Project plans for a twin tower directly to the east, Two Detroit Center, were placed indefinitely on hold. Two Detroit Center parking garage was constructed on the site in 2002.

== Tenants ==
The law firm Dickinson Wright (formerly Dickinson, Wright, Moon, Van Dusen & Freeman) has its headquarters in Ally Detroit Center. The company moved into the building when it opened in 1992. In 2007, when it renewed its lease, the company occupied almost 100,000 square feet (9,300 m^{2}) of space in the building. Additionally, the international law firm of Clark Hill, PLC operates its headquarters on three floors of the building.

The building was previously occupied by Comerica Bank. The bank's lease on then Comerica Tower at Detroit Center ran through 2012, and in December 2009, Comerica announced it would vacate One Detroit Center at the end of the lease, consolidating its Michigan operations at 411 West Lafayette Boulevard.

In March 2015, following the purchase of the building by Dan Gilbert through his Bedrock Real Estate Services, Bedrock and Ally Financial announced a 12-year lease under which it would move its main office into the building from the nearby Renaissance Center as well consolidate all employees in suburban Detroit to the building, occupying 20 floors or approximately 321,000 square feet (29,800 m^{2}). The tower was renamed Ally Detroit Center.

In 2015, a full service restaurant, Townhouse, opened in the first floor of the Ally Detroit Center, situated on the corner of Woodward and Congress. In 2019, a Plum Market grocery store was opened in the first floor, with an entrance at the corner of Woodward and Larned.
