= Rock Ventures =

Holding company for businessman Dan Gilbert

Rock Ventures LLC
- Company type: Private holding company
- Founded: 2007
- Founder: Dan Gilbert
- Headquarters: Detroit, Michigan, United States
- Key people: Dan Gilbert, Founder and Chairman
- Owner: Dan Gilbert
- Subsidiaries: Amrock, Rocket Companies, Bedrock
- Website: www.rock.com

Rock Ventures LLC (doing business as ROCK) is the holding company for the portfolio of companies, investments, and real estate properties owned by American businessman Dan Gilbert. It is based in Detroit, Michigan and engaged in community development in both Detroit and Cleveland, Ohio. Its over 110 affiliated companies included the Cleveland Cavaliers and Rocket Mortgage.

== History ==
Rock Ventures was founded by Dan Gilbert in 2007. By 2018, Rock Ventures accounted for 17,000 jobs in the City of Detroit, making it the largest employer and taxpayer in the city. It had more than 100 companies under its umbrella at that time.

== Holdings ==
Rock Ventures owns a stake in more than 100 companies.

=== Financial services ===
- Trust & Will

=== Investment ===
- 100 Thieves
- Dwolla
- Ethos Technologies
- Filson
- May Mobility
- Robb Report
- Shinola
- StockX

=== Real estate ===
- Rocket Companies
- Rocket Mortgage
- Forsalebyowner.com
- Redfin
- Rocket Close

=== Sports and entertainment ===
- Cavs Legion GC
- Cleveland Cavaliers
- Cleveland Charge
- Cleveland Monsters
- Cosm
- Rock Entertainment Group
- Rocket Arena
- Rec Room

"For More Than Profit" is a registered trademark owned by Rock Ventures.

== Bedrock ==
Bedrock logo

Bedrock Management Services (commonly known and formerly branded as Bedrock Detroit) is the commercial real estate development and management division of Rock Ventures. It was founded by Dan Gilbert in 2011, a year after moving Quicken Loans to downtown Detroit.

Bedrock is the largest owner of private property in downtown Detroit; by 2026, it had invested or allocated $7.5 billion in development in Detroit. It owns 140 buildings, including:

- 1001 Woodward
- Ally Detroit Center
- Book Tower
- Buhl Building
- Cadillac Tower
- Chrysler House
- David Stott Building
- Detroit Free Press Building
- Federal Reserve Building
- First National Building
- Hudson's Detroit
- Globe Tobacco Building
- L. B. King and Company Building
- Millender Center
- One Campus Martius
- One Woodward Avenue
- The Qube
- Savoyard Centre
- The Ritz-Carlton Cleveland
- Tower City Center
- Vinton Building
- Wright-Kay Building
