= AT&T Michigan Headquarters =

Headquarters of American company AT&T in Detroit, USA

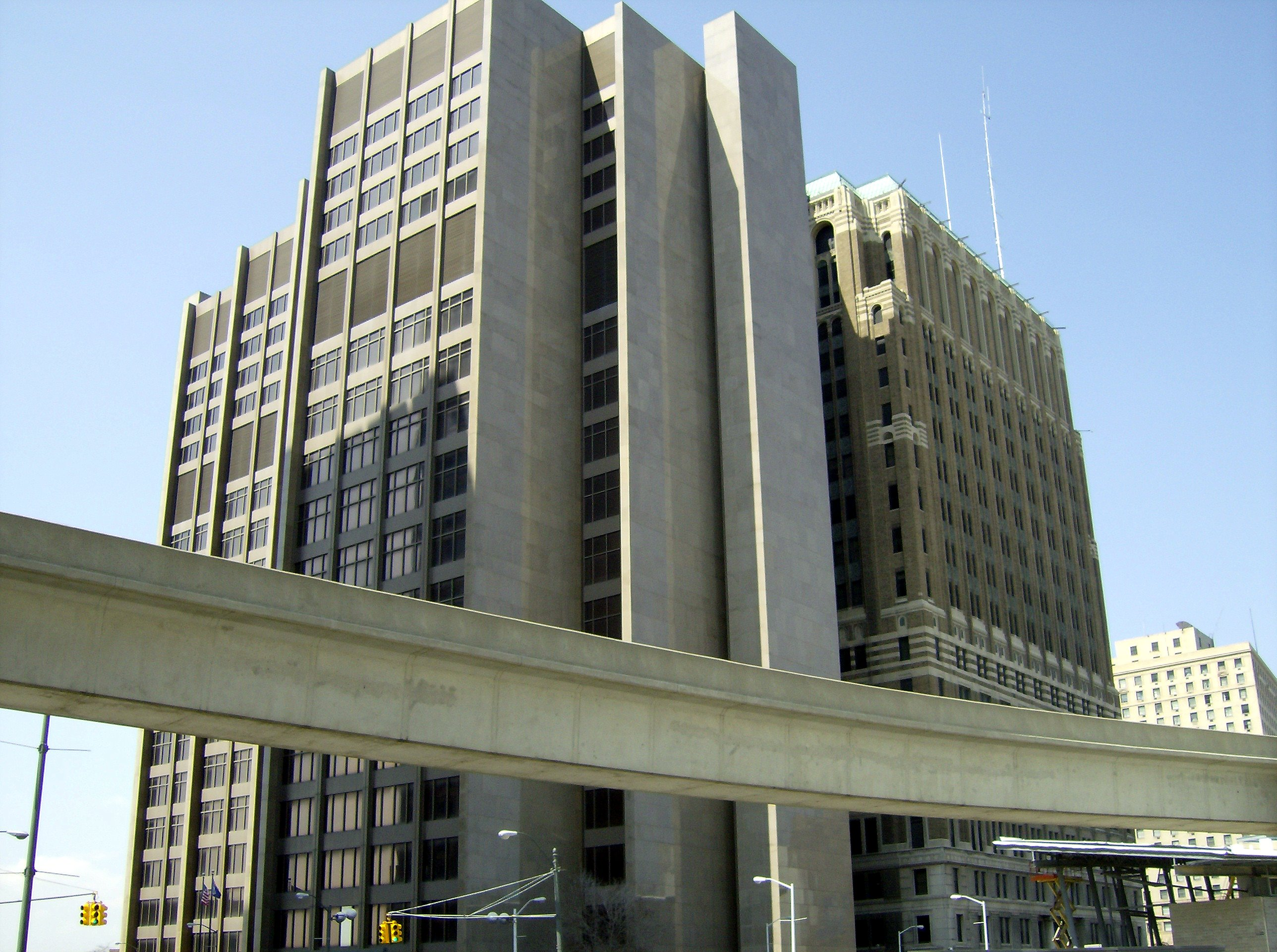
- Interactive map of the AT&T Michigan Headquarters area

General information
- Status: Completed
- Type: Office
- Location: Detroit, Michigan
- Coordinates: 42.3325°N 83.0536°W
- Construction started: 1917
- Completed: 1919, 1928, 1973

Height
- Roof: 97 m (318 ft)

Technical details
- Floor count: 17, 19

Design and construction
- Architects: Smith, Hinchman & Grylls; H. G. Christman-Burke Company

The AT&T Michigan Headquarters is a building complex located at 1st Street, Cass Avenue, State Street, and Michigan Avenue in Downtown Detroit, Michigan. It contains the AT&T Building, the AT&T Building addition, the Maintenance Shop and is owned by communications giant AT&T.

== Architecture ==
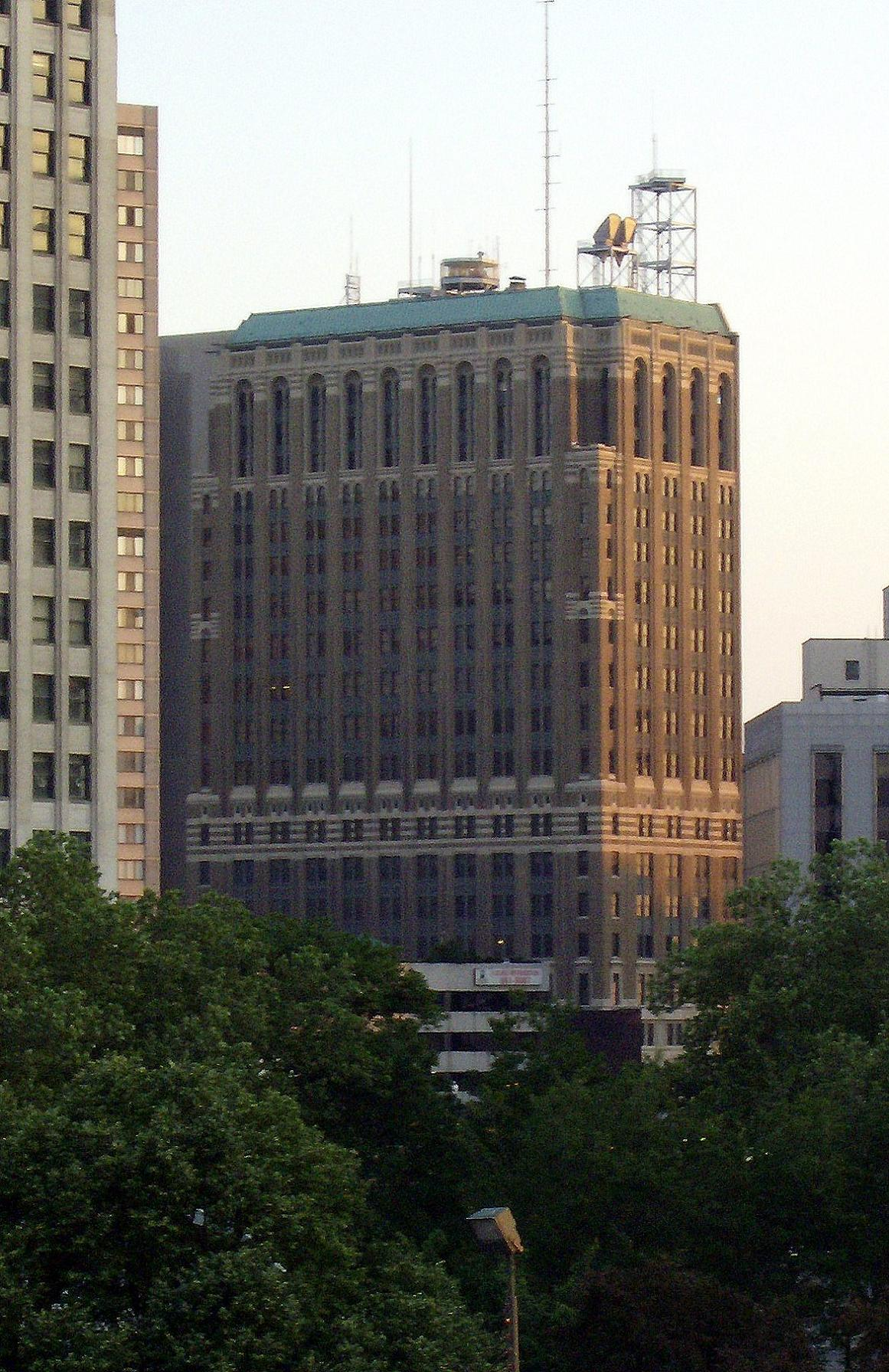
AT&T Building

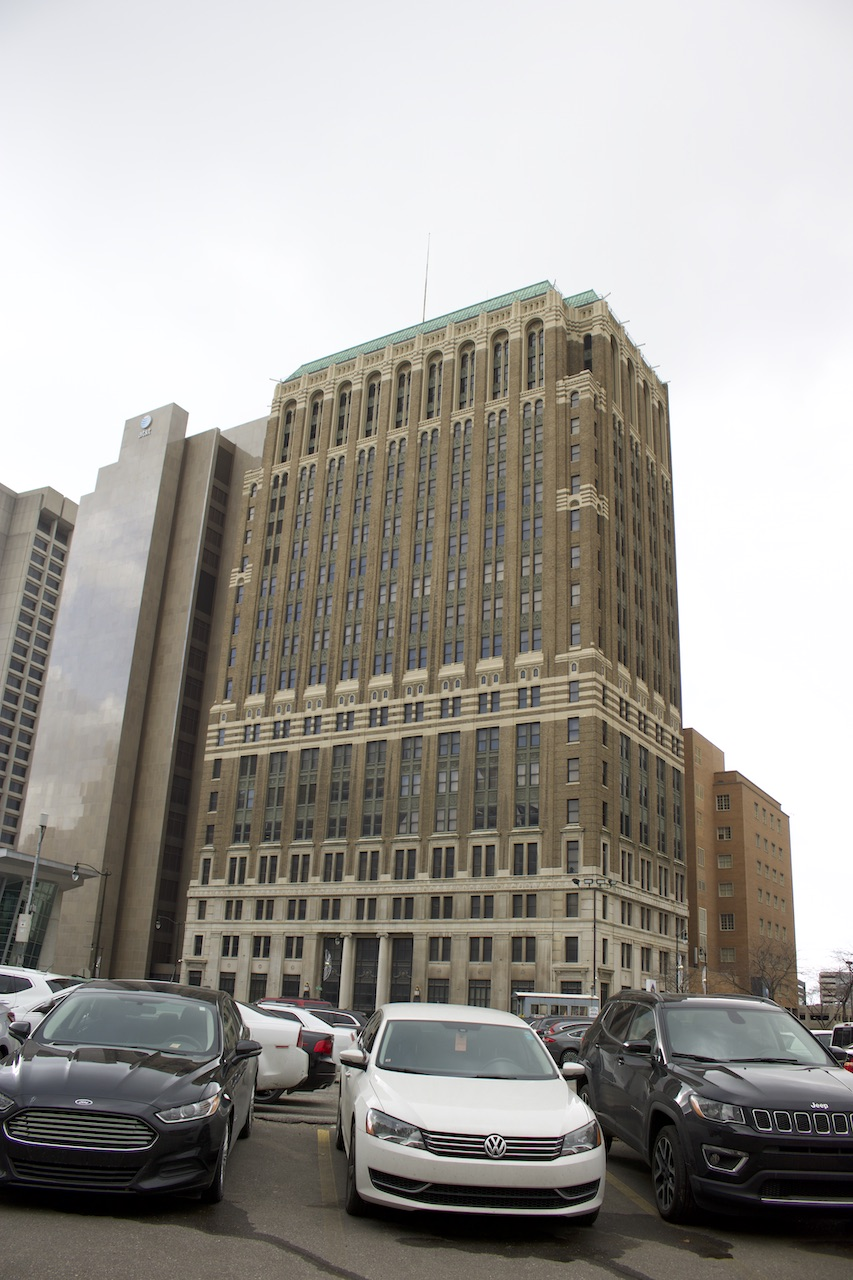
AT&T Building from parking lot

The AT&T Building (formerly known as the SBC Building, the Ameritech Building and the Michigan Bell Building) was completed for the Michigan Bell Telephone Company in 1919 and expanded in 1928. It is located at 1365 Cass Avenue, and occupies the block bordered by First Street, Cass Avenue, State Street, and Michigan Avenue. The AT&T Building stands 19 stories tall. The original 7-story structure completed in 1919 was designed to accommodate additional floors as needed. Construction of the 12-story addition began in June 1927, and was completed in September 1928. Several horizontal bands of limestone mark the top of the original structure.

The high-rise building is used as the Michigan headquarters for communications giant AT&T. It is designed in the Art Deco and Art moderne architectural styles, using tan brick and limestone for the façade. Windows are grouped in twos divided by brick piers and have bronze spandrel panels below depicting lightning bolts, bells and other symbols related to communication. Windows on floors 17 through 19 are recessed and framed by large arches. The facade is finished by limestone balustrade and copper mansard roof.

The architectural firm of Smith Hinchman & Grylls designed both the original 7-story building, with work done by Pontiac Construction, and the 12-story addition, with construction by the H. G. Christman-Burke Company, now The Christman Company of Lansing, Michigan. The design for the 1919 building included the future addition of 12 floors. However, when Michigan Bell made the decision to construct the additional floors, the design had become outdated. Wirt C. Rowland, Chief Designer for Smith, Hinchman & Grylls, devised a new plan which resulted in a more modern look without requiring significant alterations of the original building.

The maintenance shop is a nine-story structure added in 1950 to the west of the original building facing First Street and State Streets. It is faced with tan brick with pink granite covering the lower two floors.

The AT&T Building Addition stands at 444 Michigan Avenue and occupies the site south of the earlier building. It was constructed in 1973 and finished the following year. The office building stands at 21 stories, although floors 18-20 are only accessible by the service elevator or stairs, and floor 21 by stairs only. There are also three other hidden floors, 7M, 13 and 15M, which are also only accessible by service elevator or stairs. The building houses office space and telecommunications equipment and was designed in the modern architectural style. It was faced with weathering steel, bronze-tinted glass and granite. Like the earlier building, it is designed to accommodate additional floors when the need arises.

In subsequent alterations, the weathering steel was painted and a portico added at the Michigan Avenue entrance. The addition was also designed by the architecture firm of Smith Hinchman & Grylls.

When the addition was completed, Young Woman and Her Suitors (Jeune fille et sa suite in French) by sculptor Alexander Calder was installed at the corner of Michigan and Cass Avenues. In 2006, the sculpture was removed for conservation and in October 2007, the communications company donated it to the Detroit Institute of Arts. It was installed in its new location in May 2008.

== See also ==
- Detroit-Columbia Central Office Building
- List of tallest buildings in Detroit
