= Huntington Bank Tower =

Skyscraper in Detroit

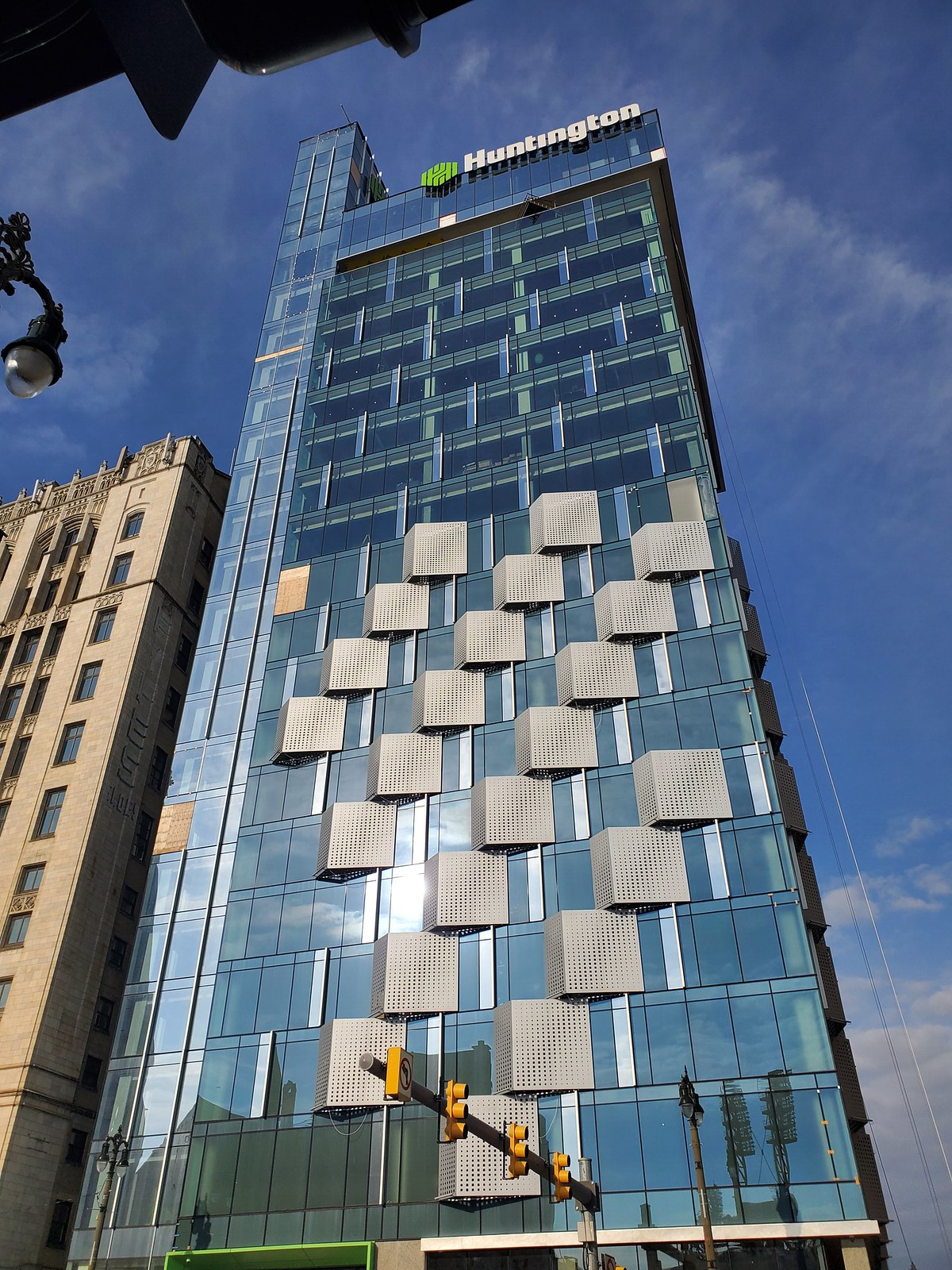
- Interactive map of the Huntington Bank Tower area

General information
- Status: Completed
- Coordinates: 42.337168°N 83.05110°W
- Construction started: 2019
- Completed: September 2022
- Owner: The Herrick Company

Height
- Height: 311 ft (95 m)

Technical details
- Floor count: 20

Design and construction
- Architect: Neumann/Smith Architecture
- Developer: GPC Adams LLC
- Main contractor: Brinker Group

Other information
- Public transit: Grand Circus Park; Grand Circus; SMART FAST Woodward 461, 462; DDOT 4 D2A2

Huntington Bank Tower is a 20-story, 311-foot-tall (95 m) office tower in Detroit, Michigan. The building serves as the regional headquarters for Huntington National Bank. It is located at 2025 Woodward Avenue.

== History ==
Huntington Bank Tower was initially proposed in 2018 to replace a 10-story building and a surface parking lot. The development was planned to be the headquarters of Midland-based Chemical Bank, but the bank was involved in a series of mergers that led to the new entity, Huntington National Bank, establishing a headquarters in the building. Huntington Bank Tower contains ground-floor commercial space, ten floors of parking, and another nine floors of office space.

In June 2023, Florida-based The Herrick Company announced that they had purchased Huntington Bank Tower for $150 million.

== Construction ==
Huntington Bank Tower was designed by Neumann/Smith Architecture. The general contractor for the project was Detroit-based Brinker Group. Construction on Huntington Bank Tower began in 2019 and finished in September 2022.

== See also ==
- List of tallest buildings in Detroit
- List of tallest buildings in Michigan
