= Patrick V. McNamara Federal Building =

Federal building in Detroit

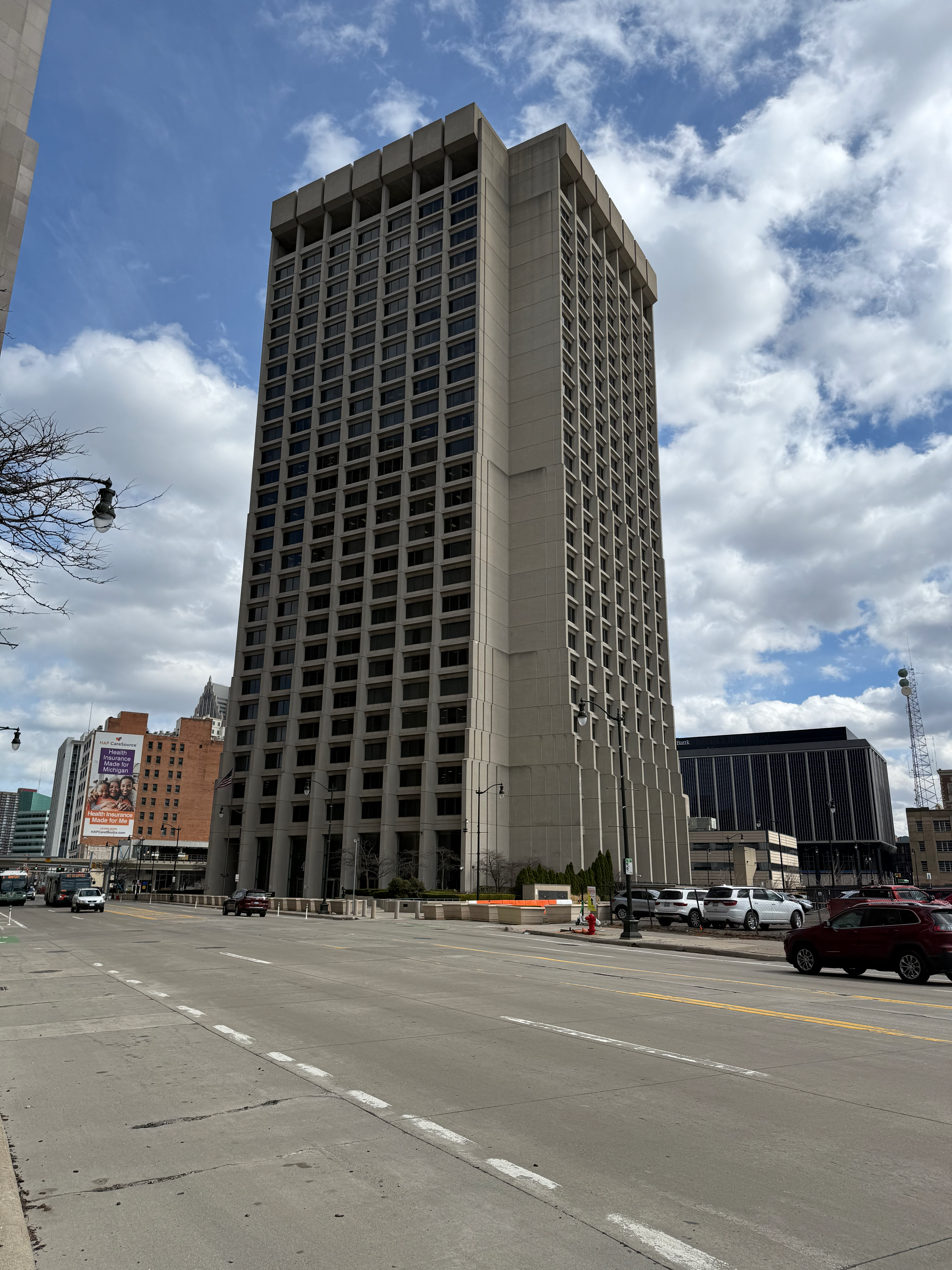
- Interactive map of the Patrick V. McNamara Federal Building area

General information
- Type: office
- Location: 477 Michigan Avenue; Detroit, Michigan
- Coordinates: 42.33115°N 83.05322°W
- Completed: 1976

Height
- Antenna spire: 414 ft (126 m)
- Roof: 393 ft (120 m)
- Top floor: 352 ft (107 m)

Technical details
- Floor count: 27

Design and construction
- Architect: Smith, Hinchman and Grylls

The Patrick V. McNamara Federal Building is a government office building located at 477 Michigan Avenue in Downtown Detroit, Michigan, designed by the Detroit architectural firm of Smith, Hinchman and Grylls. It opened in 1976 to consolidate the offices of federal agencies which were scattered in several locations in the area. It houses offices of the Consumer Product Safety Commission, Army Corps of Engineers, Defense Contract Management Agency, Federal Bureau of Investigation, United States Department of Housing and Urban Development(HUD), Internal Revenue Service, Peace Corps, Railroad Retirement Board, Veteran Affairs (VA), The American Legion Department of Michigan and Social Security Administration. It is named for Patrick V. McNamara, a Democratic United States Senator from the State of Michigan from 1955 to 1966. It has recently suffered a legionella outbreak.

== Occupants ==
Occupant Tenants by Floor
Floor	Tenant	Description
26	Federal Bureau of Investigation Detroit Field Office	Department of Justice
25	Federal Bureau of Investigation Detroit Field Office	Department of Justice
24		
25		
24		
23		
22	U.S. Marshals Service	
21		
20		
19		
18	Small Business Administration; US Senator Gary Peters - Detroit Office; Department of Homeland Security	
17		
16	Department of Housing and Urban Development	
15		
14		
13		
12	Department of Veterans Affairs	
11	Railroad Retirement Board; Federal Protective Service; Federal Occupational Health	Department of Homeland Security
10	US Secret Service	
9	Department of Homeland Security Investigations	
8	Equal Employment Opportunity Commission; National Labor Relations Board	
7	United States Army Corps of Engineers	Department of Defense
6	United States Army Corps of Engineers	Department of Defense
5	NLRB	National Labor Relations Board
4	US Immigration Court Social Security Administration	
3	US Passport Agency	Department of State
2	Mezzanine	
1	Main Lobby	
B	Basement	Cafeteria Access to Subterranean Parking

- U.S. Census Bureau

== Architecture ==
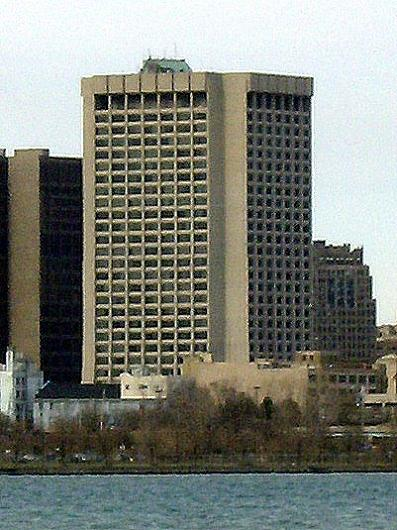
McNamara Federal Building from the southwest.

The tower contains approximately 1,000,000 ft^{2} (93,000 m^{2}) on 27 floors and is in the brutalist architectural style. The corners are recessed providing additional strength to the structure and eliminating the battle for corner offices.

The building is surrounded by a large plaza which covers the concourse level, parking garage, loading dock and a sunken fountain. In 1987, the 14 ft (4.3 m) tall modern sculpture Detroit Deliquescence by John Chamberlain was installed on the plaza. The sculpture, which consists of crushed auto body panels, was commissioned under the Art in Architecture program by General Services Administration (GSA) in 1977 for $100,000. However, it could not be placed at its intended location due to deterioration of the plaza. After the GSA and building's contractor reached a settlement for repairs, it was installed in 1987. Between the time of its completion in 1983 and 1987, the sculpture was placed at Walter P. Reuther Library of Labor and Urban Affairs on the campus of nearby Wayne State University. From the time of its installation at Wayne State, the sculpture proved unpopular with critics and members of the public.

thumb During additional repairs to the plaza in 2001, the sculpture was removed and sent for conservation. The years of exposure to the elements caused damage and GSA made the decision to relocate it to an interior space. After a two-year search for a recipient, the College for Creative Studies agreed to accept the work for its new A. Alfred Taubman Center for Design Education. It was installed for the center's opening in 2009.

The lobby of the building houses three works, an acrylic and fiber painting by Sam Gilliam entitled Box Cars Grand and an oil on panel piece by Harold Cohn called Decorative Map of Belle Isle.

On September 22, 2001, a Federal Officer was killed in the lobby by a visitor who became angry when told he would not be able to take his gun into the building.

== See also ==
- List of tallest buildings in Detroit
