= Jeffersonian Apartments =

Apartment building in Detroit

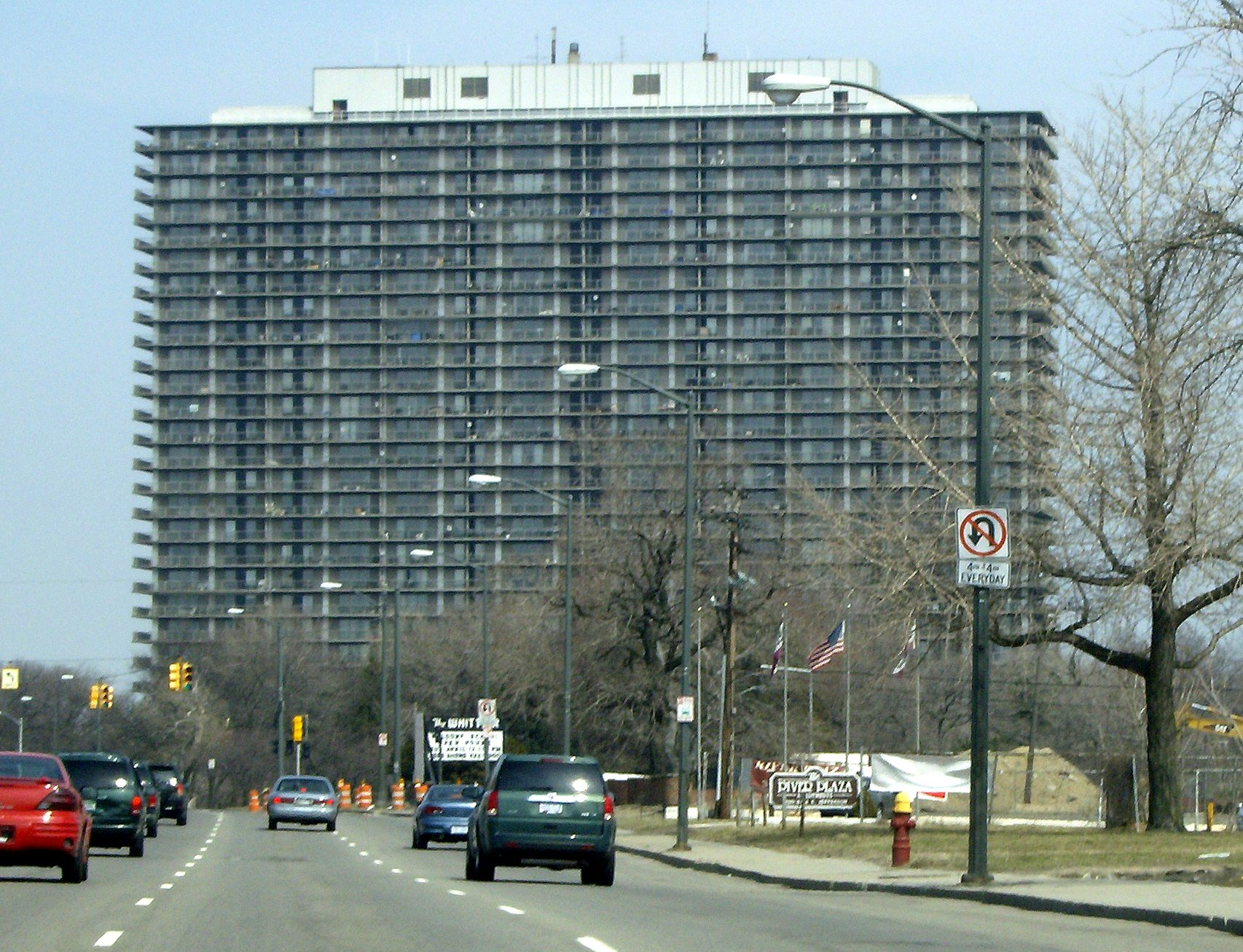
- Interactive map of the Jeffersonian Apartments area

General information
- Type: residential high-rise
- Location: 9000 East Jefferson Avenue; Detroit, Michigan
- Coordinates: 42.3558°N 82.9867°W
- Completed: 1965

Height
- Antenna spire: 102.8 m (337 ft)
- Roof: 101 m (331 ft)
- Top floor: 98.2 m (322 ft)

Technical details
- Floor count: 30

Design and construction
- Architect: Gino Rossetti

The Jeffersonian Apartments—currently branded as “The Jefferson”—is a large apartment building at 9000 East Jefferson Avenue, on the near-east side of Detroit, Michigan. Built in 1965, primarily of glass and steel in the international architecture style, it is one of Detroit's tallest residential buildings -- standing 30 stories with 412 residential units.

The site is close to the MacArthur Bridge and Belle Isle. As the building is situated on a steep slope, the Jefferson Avenue entrance is 17 feet higher than the back entrance along the Detroit River.

== Education ==
The building is zoned to Detroit Public Schools

- Howe Elementary School
- Butzel Elementary/Middle School (for 6-8)
- Southeastern High School

== See also ==
- List of tallest buildings in Detroit
- Architecture of metropolitan Detroit
- Robert Sharoff
