= Chrysler House =

Skyscraper in Detroit

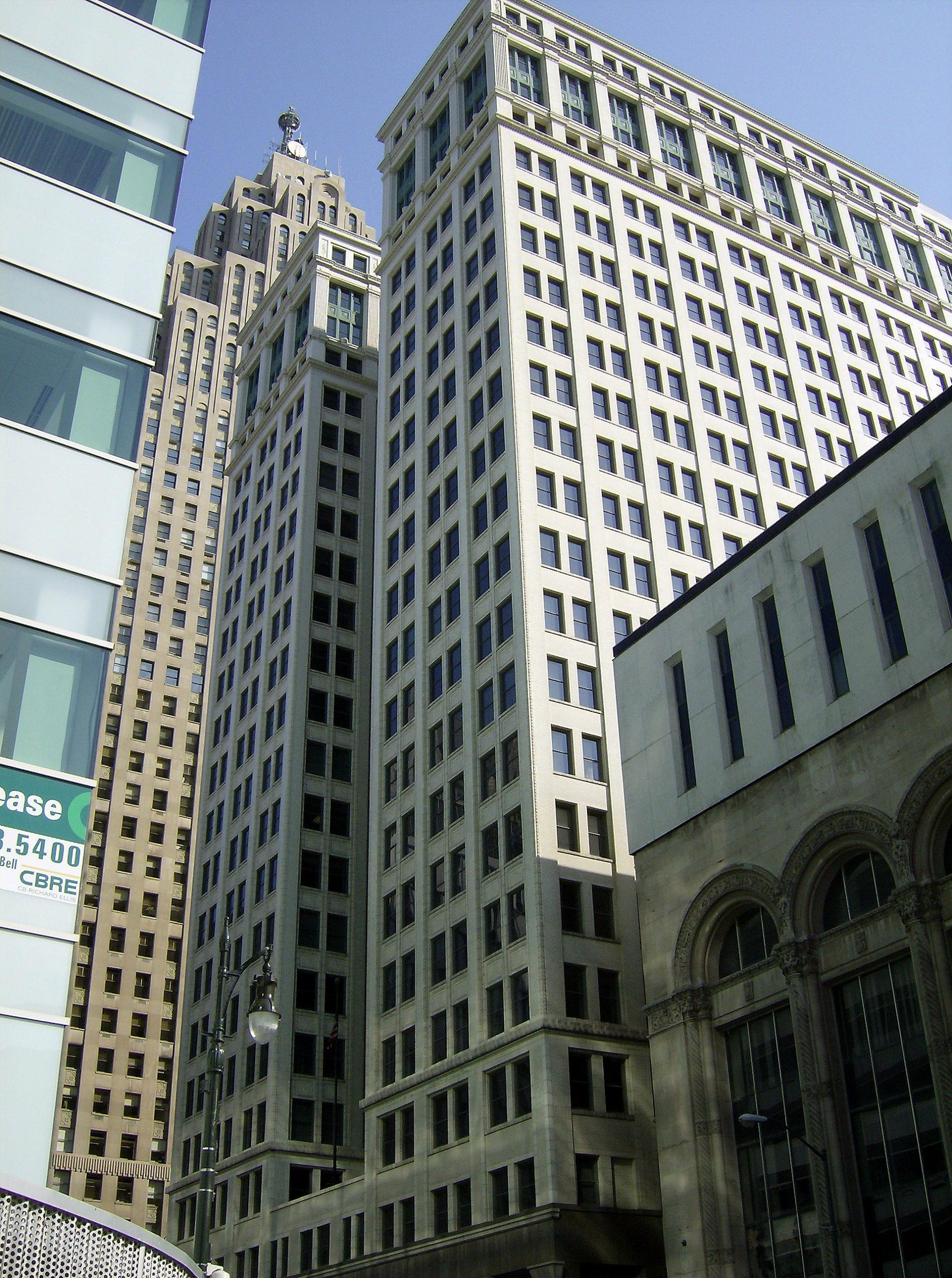
- Interactive map of the Chrysler House area
- Alternative names: Griswold Place; Dime Savings Bank Building; Commonwealth Building

General information
- Type: Commercial offices
- Location: 719 Griswold Street; Detroit, Michigan
- Coordinates: 42.331063°N 83.04832°W
- Completed: 1912
- Renovated: 2002
- Owner: Bedrock Detroit

Height
- Roof: 325 ft (99 m)

Technical details
- Floor count: 23

Design and construction
- Architect: Daniel Burnham

Renovating team
- Architect: Barton Malow
- Chrysler House
- U.S. Historic district – Contributing property
- Location within Michigan
- Architectural style: Neo-Classical
- Part of: Detroit Financial District (ID09001067)
- Designated CP: December 14, 2009

Chrysler House is a 23-story, 325-foot (99 m) office building located at 719 Griswold Street in Downtown Detroit, Michigan. The building is adjacent to the Penobscot Building in the heart of the U.S. designated Detroit Financial District. It is used as an office building, with retail space on the street level. It was originally known as the Dime Building but has carried numerous names over the years.

== History ==
The building was constructed between 1910 and 1912 and known for many years as the Dime Building. When completed, the tower was named the Dime Savings Bank Building for its primary tenant. It was later renamed the Commonwealth Building, briefly known as Griswold Place. It became the Dime Building again in 2002, before being renamed in 2012.

The original Lincoln Highway Association national headquarters occupied office 2115 on the 21st floor from 1913 to 1928.

For several years through 1983, the building housed the headquarters of Bank of the Commonwealth until that bank merged with Comerica. In 2002, a $40-million renovation was completed.

In August 2011, Quicken Loans founder Dan Gilbert purchased the building along with the nearby Qube, First National Building and Wright-Kay Building.

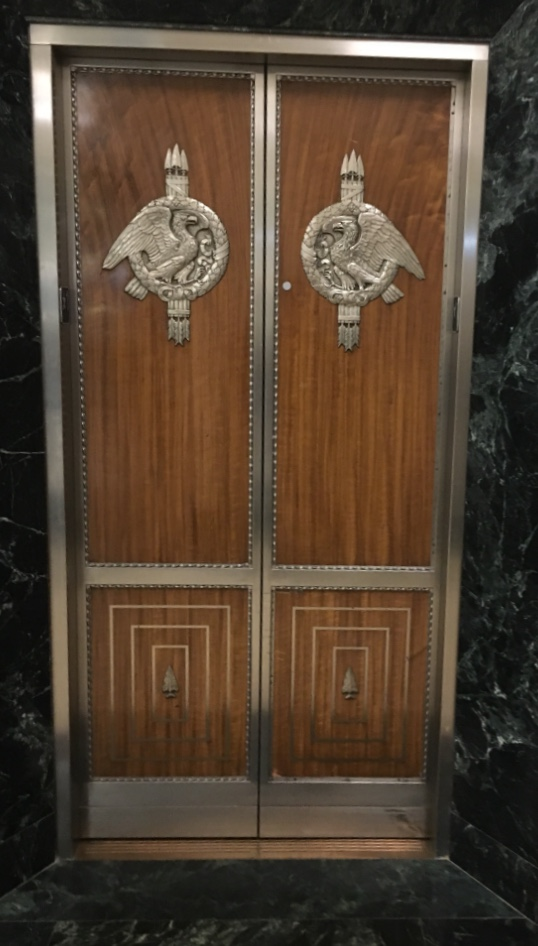
Doors inside the Chrysler House

On April 30, 2012, Gilbert and Chrysler Group LLC chairman Sergio Marchionne announced that Chrysler will move its Great Lakes Business Center and some executive offices, with approximately 70 employees, into the two top floors of the building. As part of the lease, the building was renamed for the company.

== Architecture ==
The tower was designed in the Neoclassical architectural style by Daniel Burnham. The steel-framed structure is faced with white glazed brick and terra cotta trim. The most distinctive feature is the central light court which begins on the third floor and creates a U-shaped floor plan on the upper office floors. This feature can be seen in an earlier version on Burnham's Miner's National Bank Building, now Citizens Bank financial Center, completed one year earlier in downtown Wilkes-Barre, Pennsylvania. Miner's National Bank is a similar, but smaller-scale design with the main banking hall in the space below the light court and featuring a large skylight. A later expansion of the building altered the U-shape of the upper floors.

In a subsequent renovation, the lower two floors were refaced with gray granite and a pediment above the central entrance and cornice were removed.

== Gallery ==
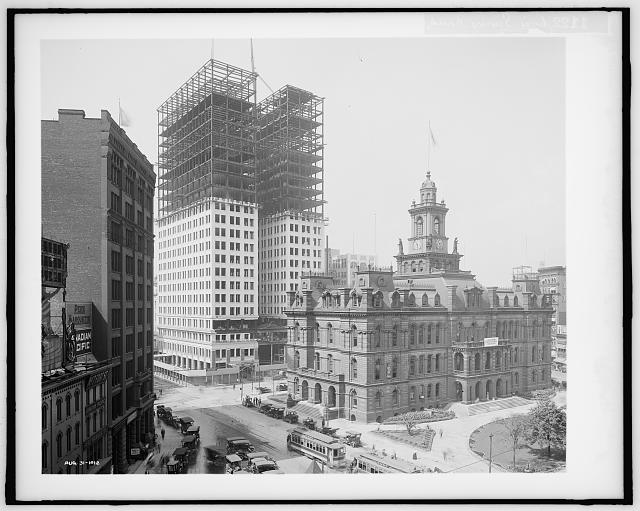
Construction of the Dime Building. August 31, 1912

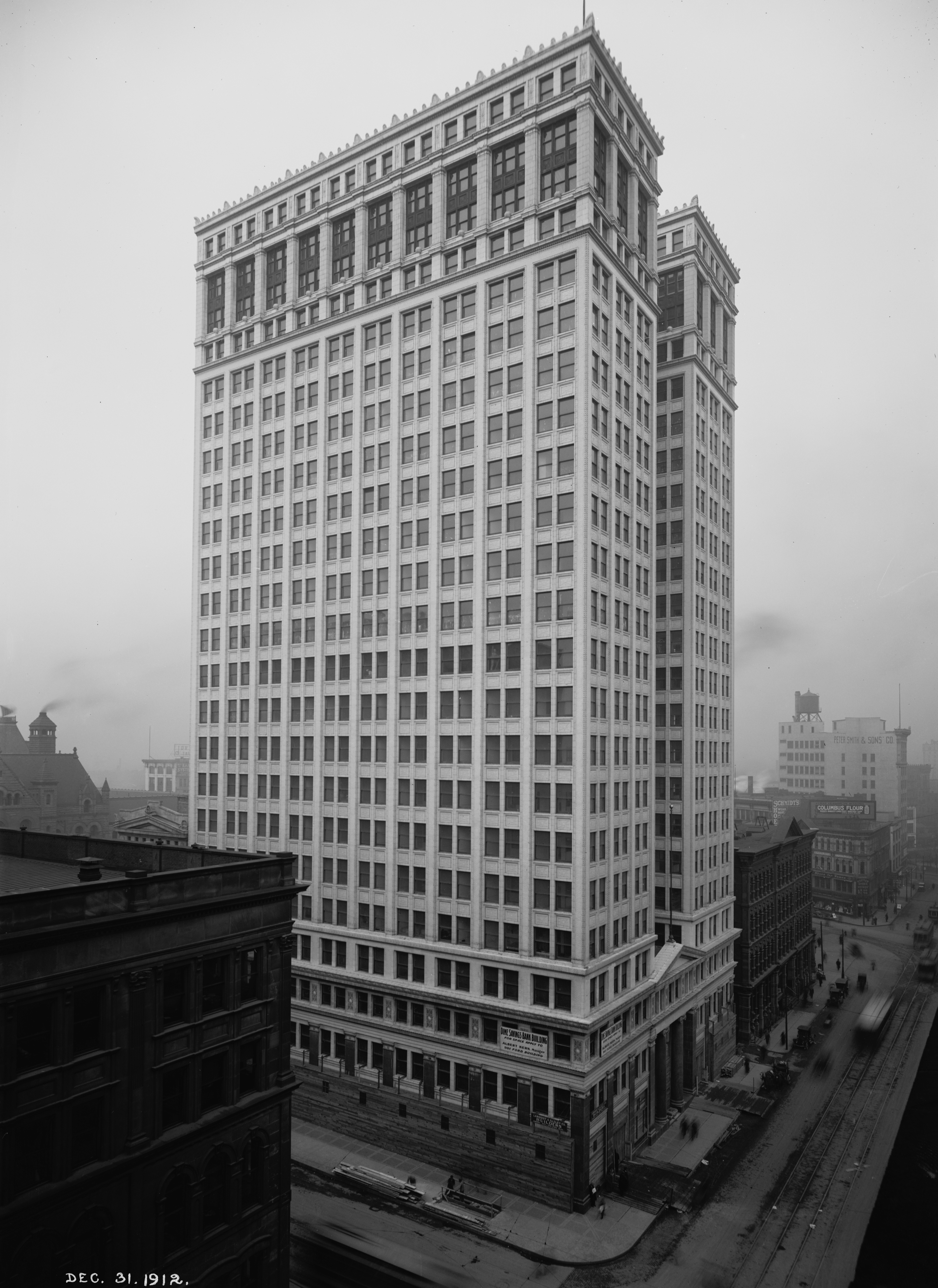
Exterior. December 31, 1912

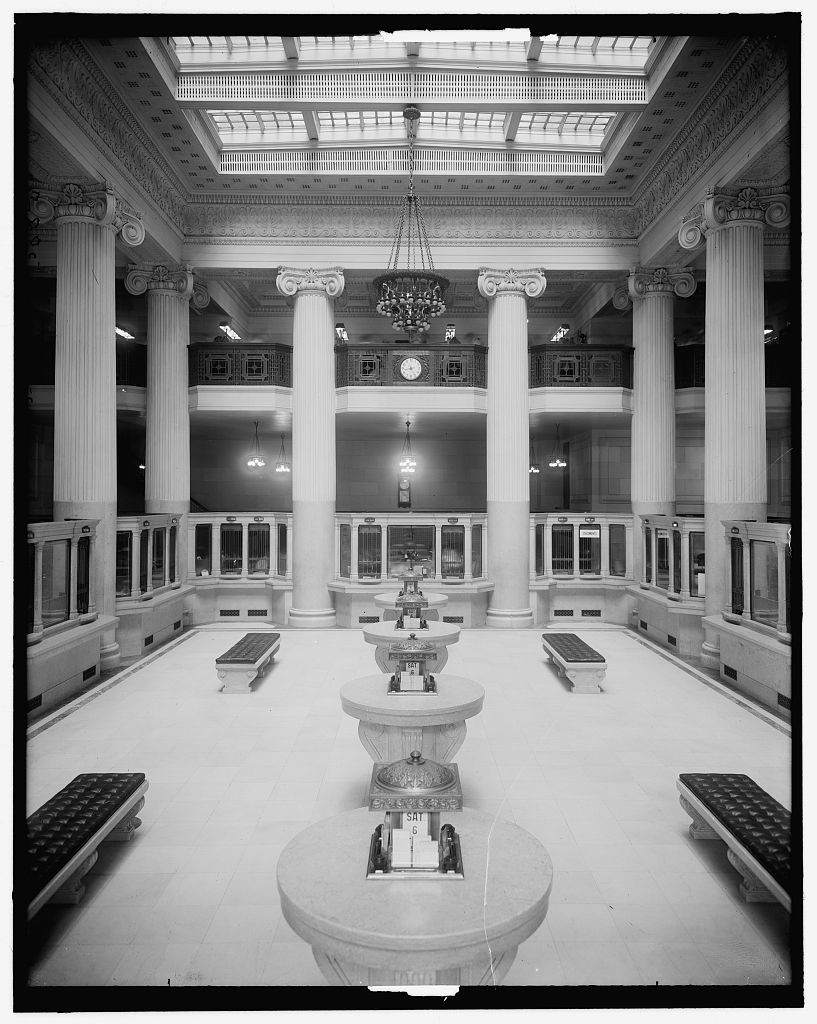
Interior, c. 1912

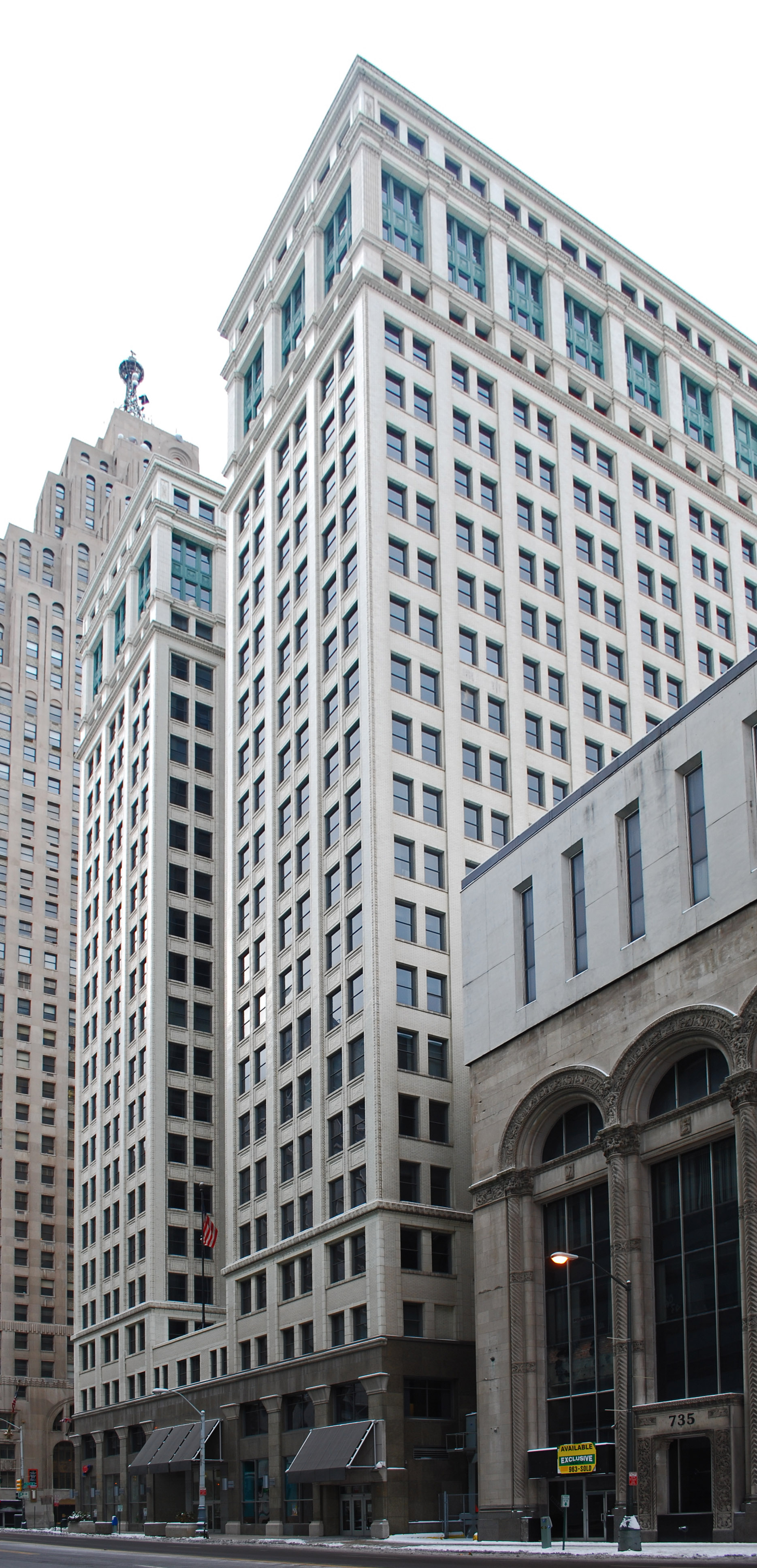

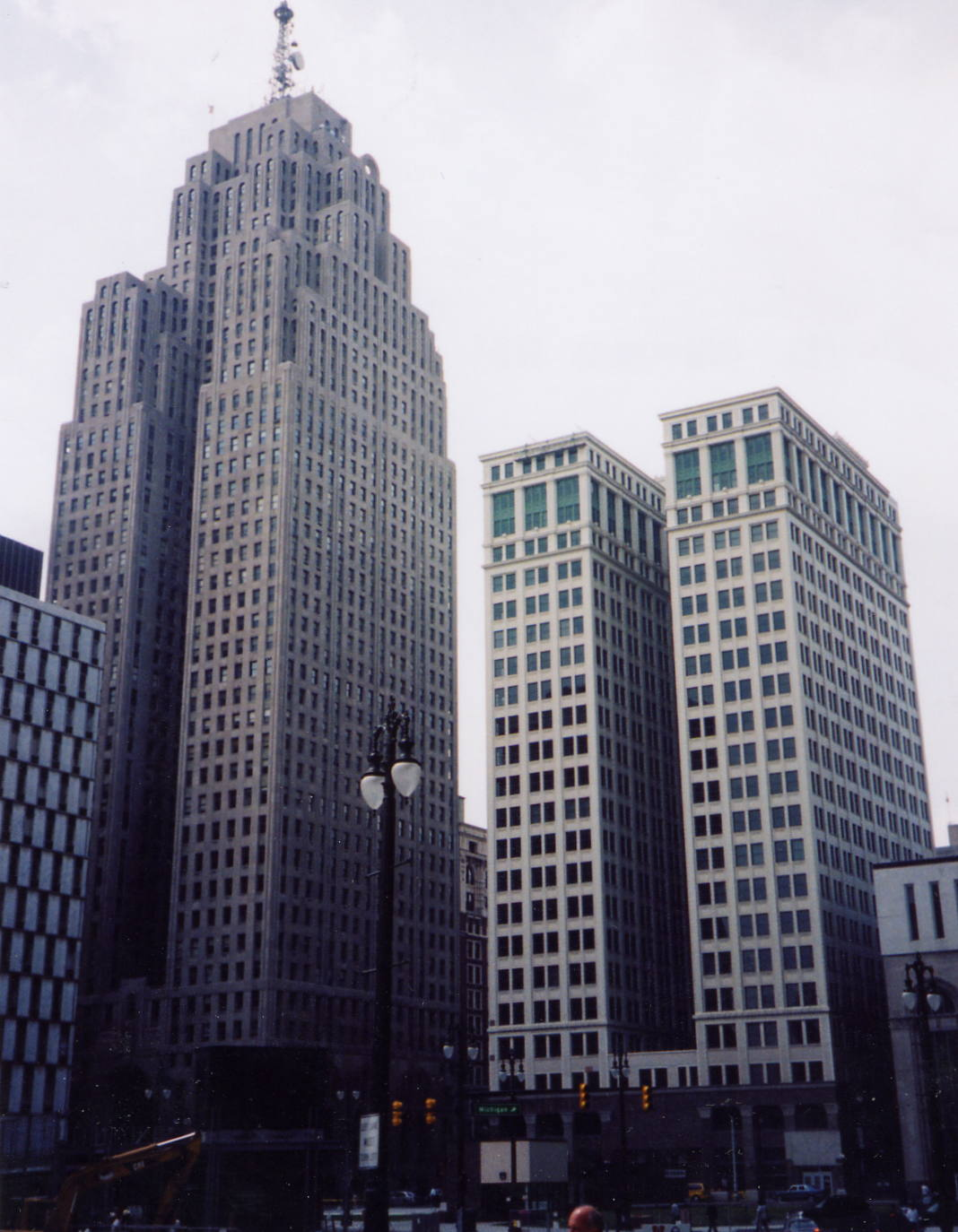
Penobscot Building left, with the Chrysler House

== See also ==
- List of tallest buildings in Detroit
- Chrysler World Headquarters and Technology Center
- Sergio Marchionne
