= Blue Cross Blue Shield of Michigan Building =

Skyscraper in Detroit

Coordinates: 42.3343°N 83.0393°W

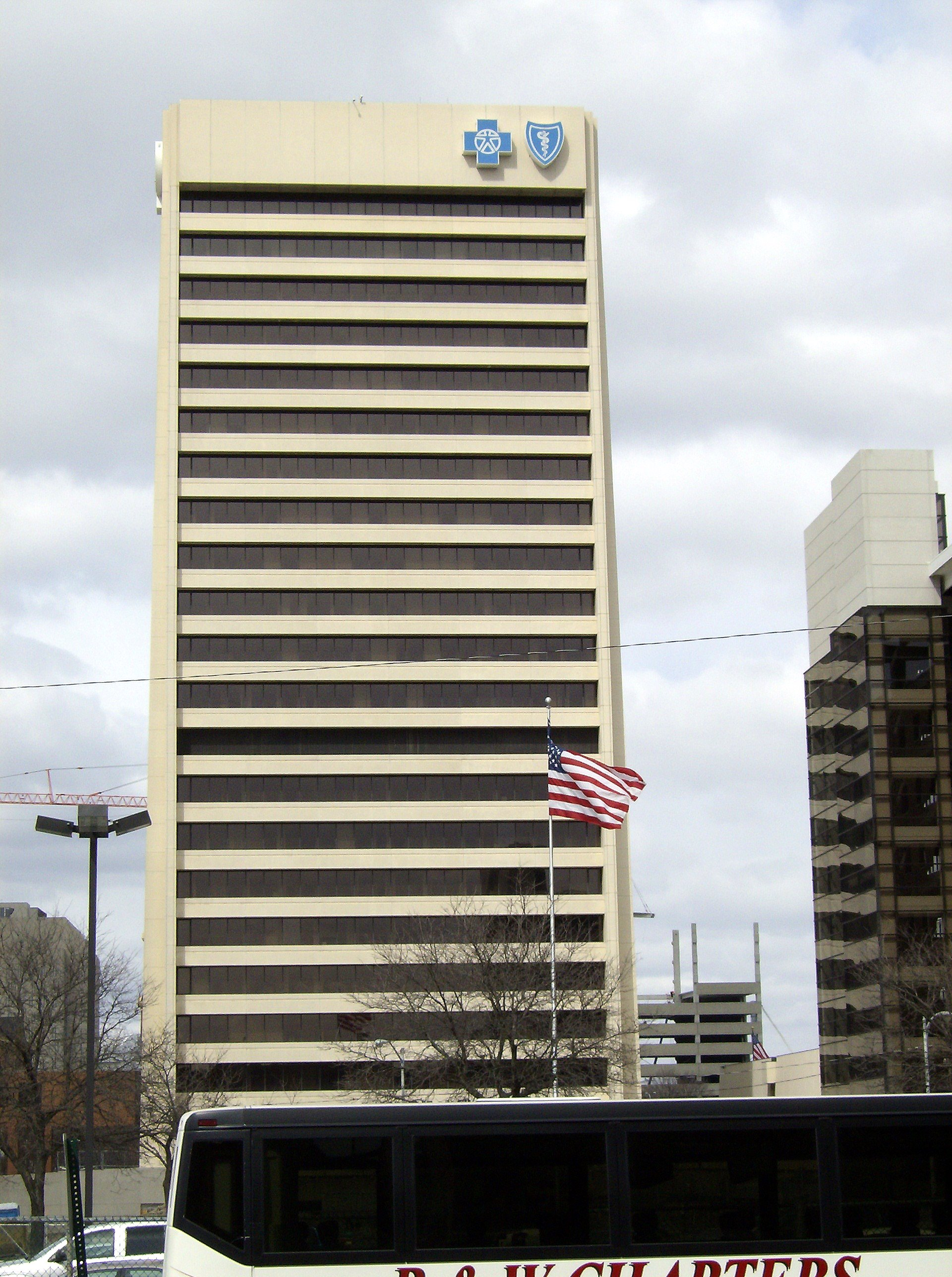
Blue Cross Blue Shield of Michigan Building in Detroit.

The Blue Cross Blue Shield of Michigan Building is an office tower located at 600 East Lafayette Boulevard in Downtown Detroit, Michigan, near the Renaissance Center complex. It is also known as the Blue Cross Blue Shield Service Center. It was constructed in 1971, and stands at 22 floors. The building was constructed in a sunken plaza. It houses Blue Cross Blue Shield of Michigan. The campus in downtown Detroit also includes offices for 3,000 employees at Towers 500 and 600 of the Renaissance Center linked by the Detroit People Mover.

== Gallery ==
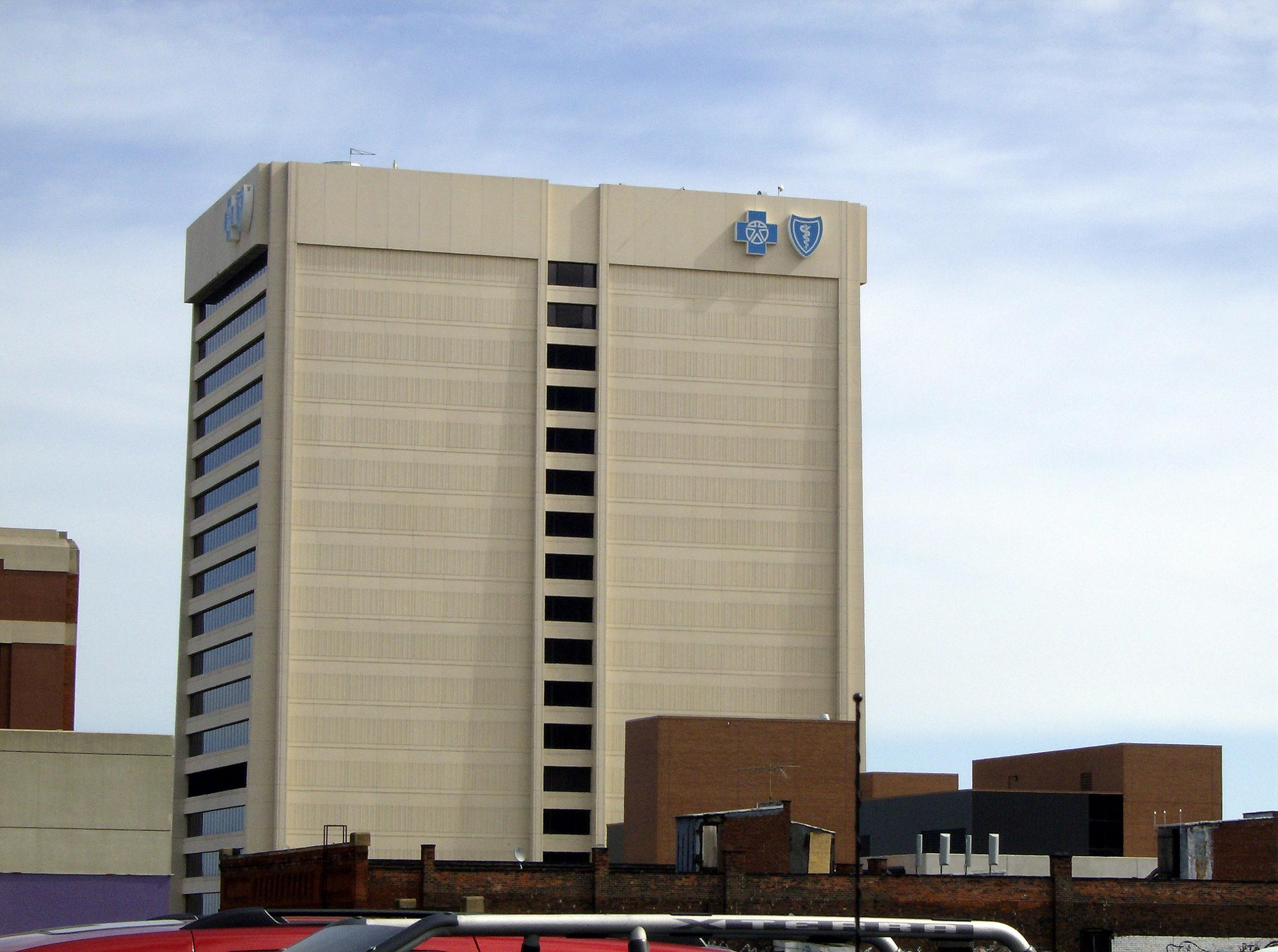
Blue Cross Blue Shield Service Center.
