= Hudson's Detroit =

Mixed-use skyscraper development in Downtown Detroit

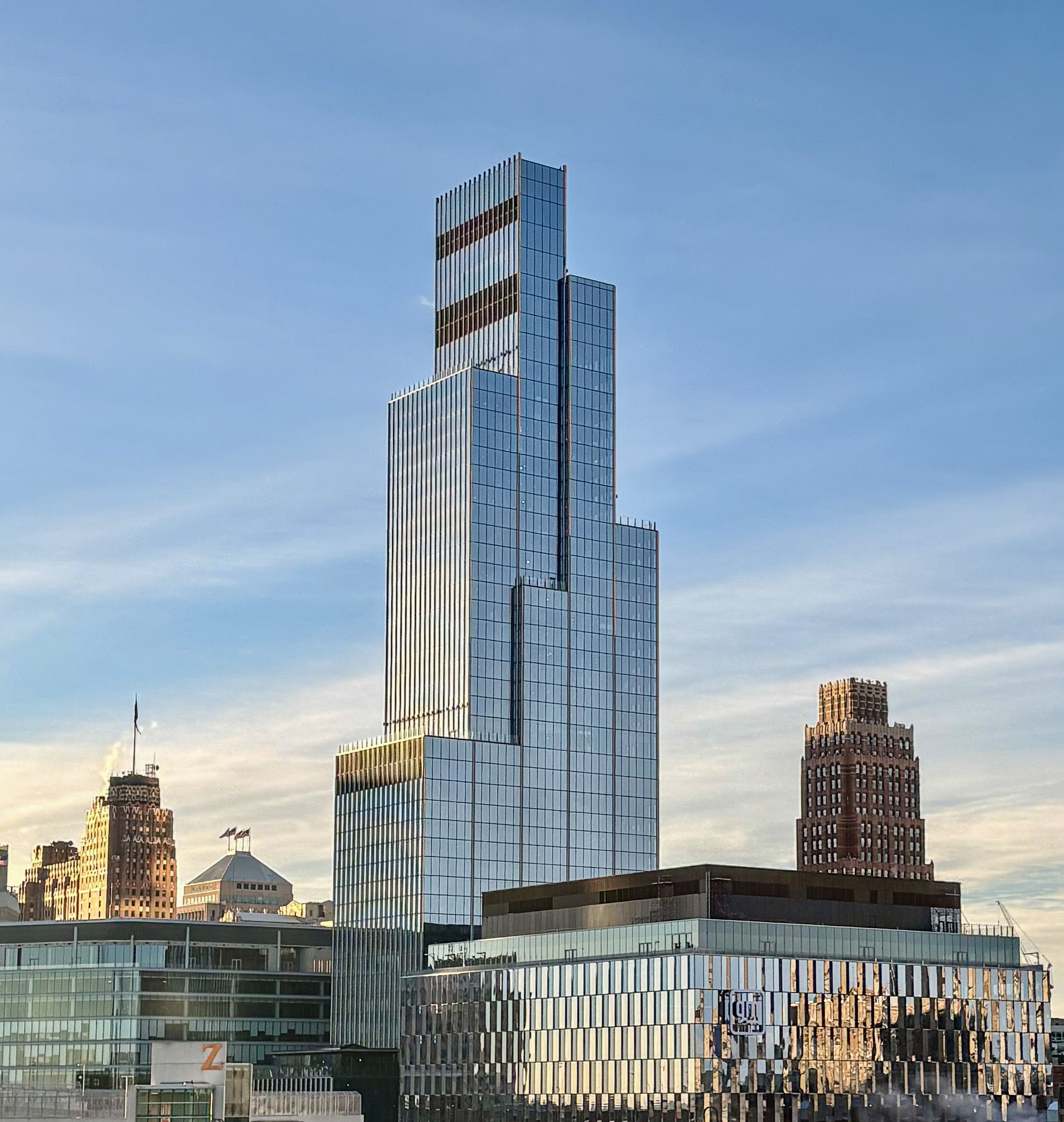
- Hudson's Detroit in January 2026

General information
- Status: Completed
- Location: 1208 Woodward Avenue, Detroit, Michigan, U.S. 48226
- Coordinates: 42.33389°N 83.04809°W
- Construction started: December 14, 2017
- Topped-out: April 10, 2024
- Completed: October 9, 2025 to 2027
- Opening: August 22, 2025 to 2027
- Cost: $1.4 billion
- Owner: Bedrock Detroit

Height
- Height: 208 meters (681 ft) (Tower); 71 meters (232 ft) (Block Building)

Technical details
- Floor count: 49 (Tower); 12 (Block Building)
- Floor area: 130,064 m^{2} (1,400,000 sq ft)

Design and construction
- Architects: SHoP Architects; Hamilton Anderson Associates
- Developer: Bedrock Detroit
- Main contractor: Barton Malow

Other information
- Public transit: Cadillac Center; QLine Campus Martius; DDOT 4

Website
- hudsons-detroit.com

Hudson's Detroit is a landmark mixed-use building complex in downtown Detroit, Michigan, United States. It includes a 49-story, 681-foot (208 m) skyscraper, with a hotel and condominiums, and a 12-story, 232-foot (71 m) mid-rise building, containing commercial offices, retail space, and a conference center. The taller tower is the second-tallest building in Detroit as well as in Michigan, and is the first skyscraper taller than 500 feet (150 m) to be built in Detroit in the 21st century.

== History ==
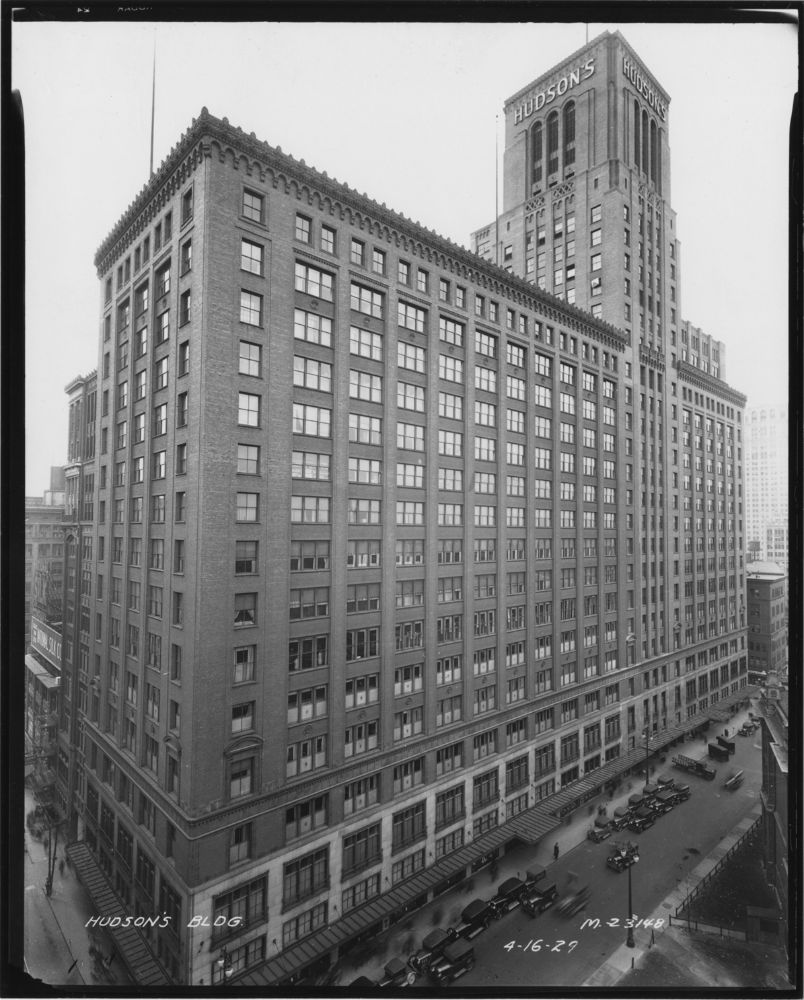
J.L. Hudson's Flagship Store, 1929

=== Site ===
Hudson's Detroit is located at 1208 Woodward Avenue in Downtown Detroit, on the block bounded by Grand River Avenue to the north, Farmer Street to the east, and Gratiot Avenue to the south. The block was previously the site of the flagship store of The J. L. Hudson Company, a local chain of department stores, for which Hudson's Detroit is named.

Built in phases between 1911 and 1946, the Hudson's flagship store was the tallest department store in the world, at 440 ft (134 m), and the second largest department store in the world by area, behind Macy's Herald Square in New York City. The store closed in 1983, and was imploded in 1998, making it the tallest building to ever be demolished by controlled implosion.

In 2001, an underground parking garage was constructed at the site, designed to support a structure of up to 18 floors on top.

=== Redevelopment planning ===
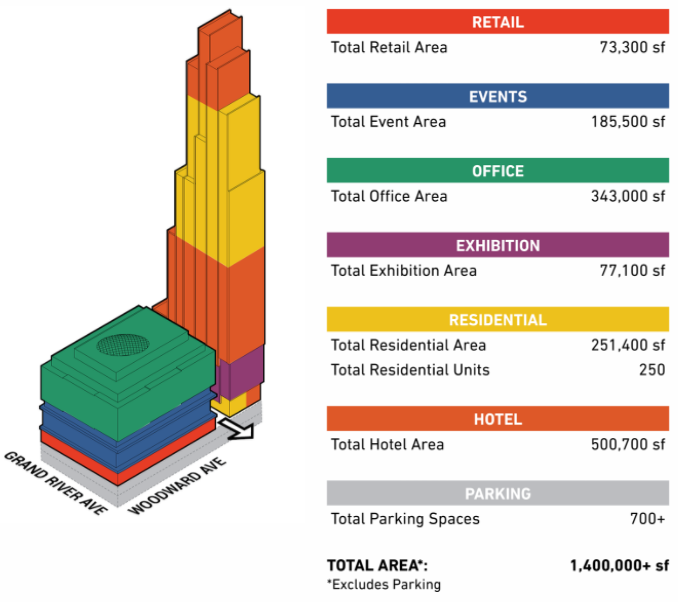
Hudson's Site mixed use proposal.

Rock Ventures gained the rights to develop the site in 2007, initially considering it as a site for the headquarters of Quicken Loans. In March 2013, after over a decade of little activity at the site, Quicken Loans founder Dan Gilbert announced a competition seeking ideas for development of the site. The contest received 200 submissions, and was won by two architects from Italy. That November, Rock Ventures hired SHoP Architects to lead the design of the development, with Detroit-based Hamilton Anderson Associates serving as a local partner.

An initial design of the planned building was leaked in March 2015. Rock's real estate division, by then known as Bedrock Detroit, purchased the city-owned parking garage in April 2016.

When plans for the development were first revealed in February 2017, the taller tower was planned to rise 734 feet (224 m), narrowly surpassing the Renaissance Center as the tallest building in Detroit and in Michigan. Its proposed height was expanded to 800 feet (240 m) in September 2017, and by 2018, Bedrock was publicly considering heightening the tower to 912 feet (278 m). By 2019, plans were scaled back, shortening the tower and removing a proposed observation deck. Its final height of roughly 680 feet (210 m) was announced in March 2020.

=== Construction ===
Ground was broken on December 14, 2017. Construction began with the removal of the underground parking garage that had been built in 2001. In March 2020, construction progress was halted due to the COVID-19 pandemic, but resumed after 45 days. In December of the same year, construction reached above the ground for the first time.

=== Completion ===
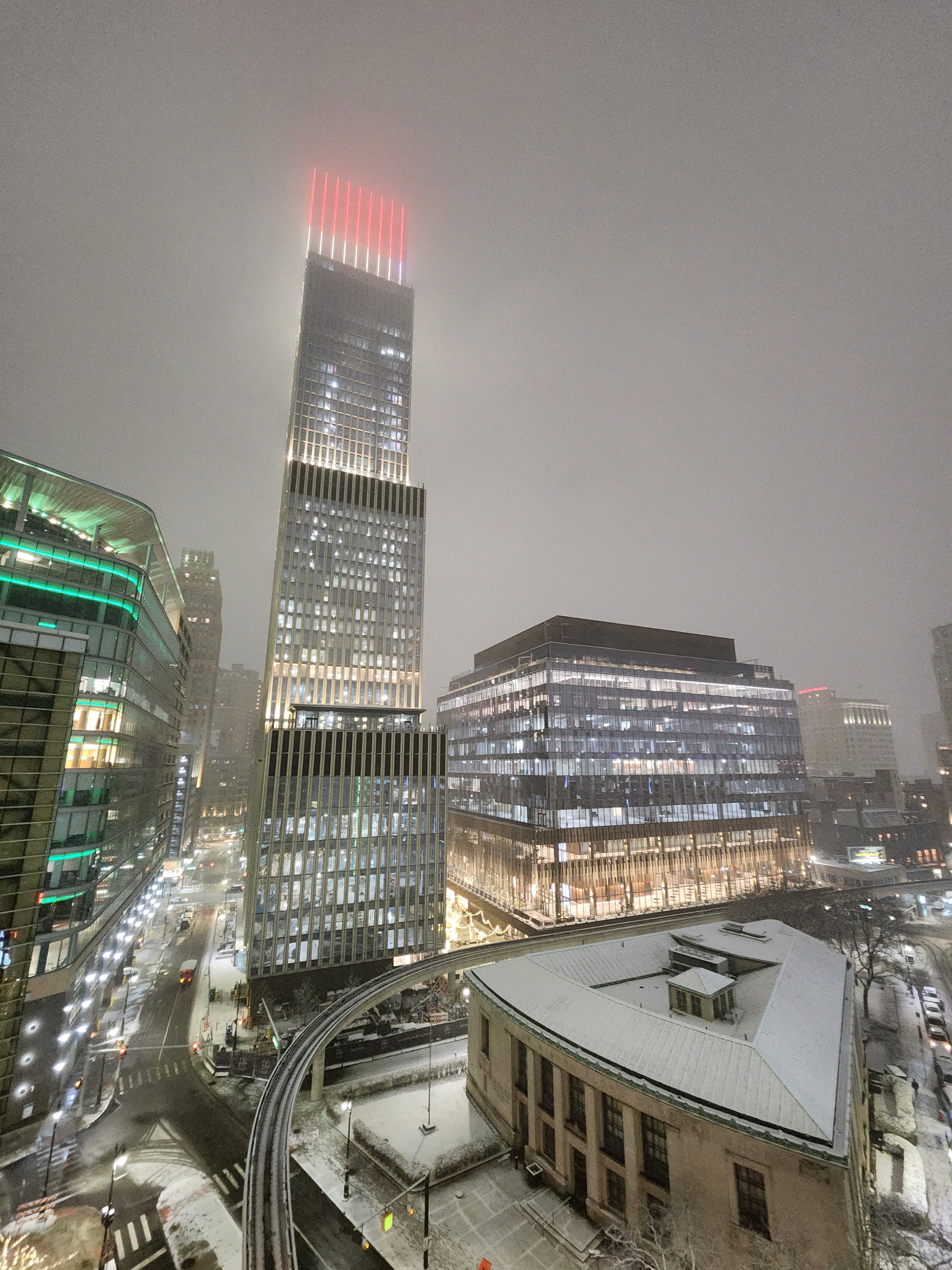
Exterior at night in November 2025

The high-rise tower was topped out on April 10, 2024; two days later on April 12, the development's final name, Hudson's Detroit, was announced. On April 15, General Motors announced that it would relocate its global headquarters from the Renaissance Center to the top two floors of the Block Building; in November, GM expanded its planned lease to four floors.

The pedestrian plaza between the buildings was dedicated Nick Gilbert Way on November 6, 2025, in honor of Dan Gilbert's late son. General Motors's headquarters and showroom formally opened in the building on January 12, 2026.

== Description ==
The complex consists of two buildings: the 49-story, 681-foot (208 m) Hudson's Tower, which will contain an EDITION hotel and condominiums; and the 12-story, 232-foot (71 m) Hudson's Block Building, which contains commercial offices and a conference center. Between the two buildings is Nick Gilbert Way, a pedestrian plaza. A 700-space underground parking garage links the two buildings.

=== Architecture ===
The complex was designed by SHoP Architects in a contemporary style.

=== Block Building tenants ===
General Motors is the largest office tenant in the Block Building, with its global headquarters occupying floors 8 through 11 since January 2026. The building includes a vehicle showroom on the ground floor, and features 20-foot-tall signs with the company's logo on all four sides.

Other office tenants include the headquarters of Rock Holdings, the Gilbert Family Foundation, and the Ven Johnson Law Firm, and offices of Rocket Companies, JPMorgan Chase, and Accenture. As of June 2026, all announced office tenants at Hudson's Detroit were previously tenants of other Downtown Detroit office buildings.

=== Hotel ===
On April 17, 2024, Bedrock announced that the taller tower would consist of a five-star EDITION hotel and 97 luxury condominiums, to be completed by 2027.

== Gallery ==
Construction Progress
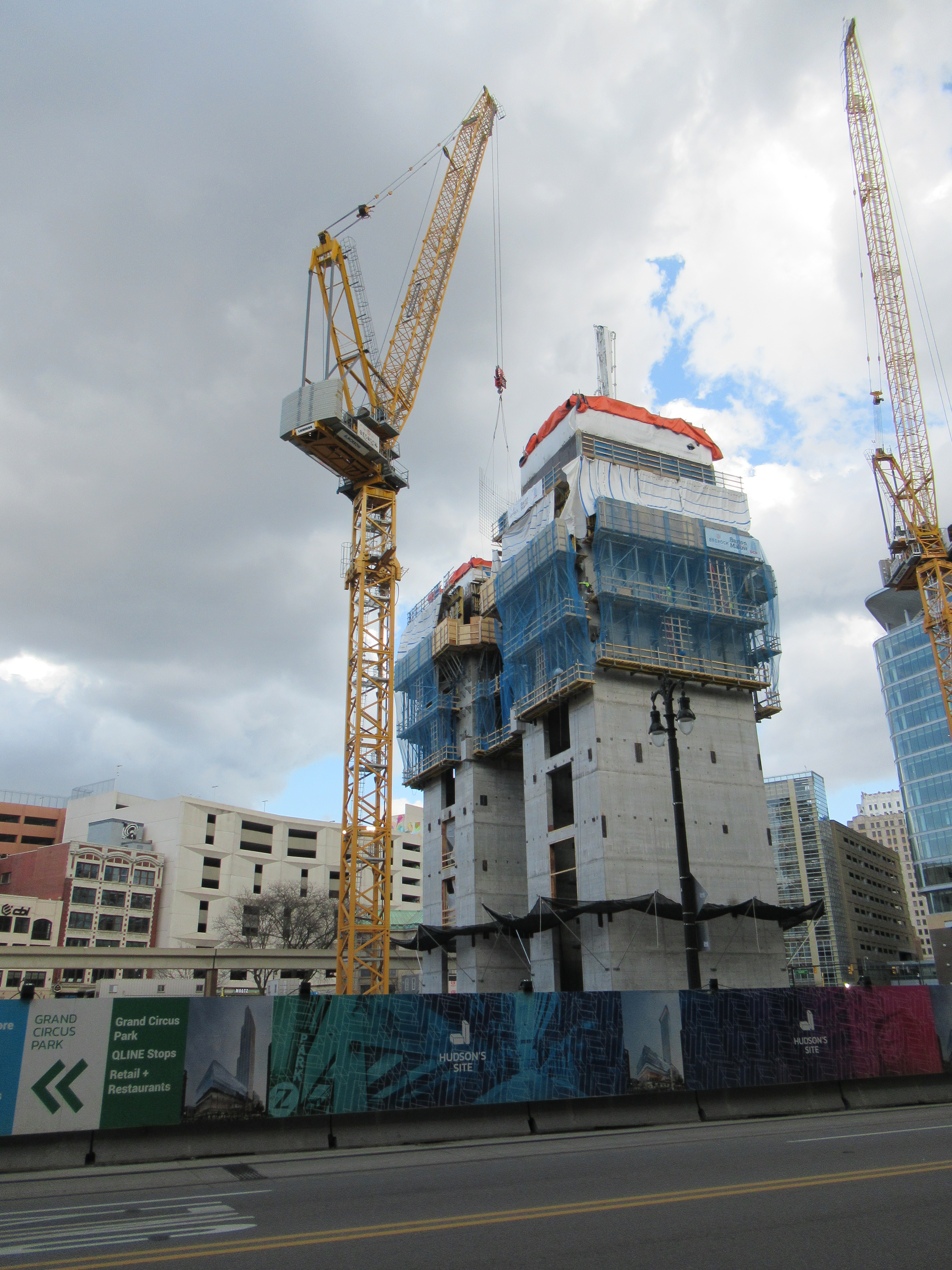
Elevator shafts of the Block Building in April 2021

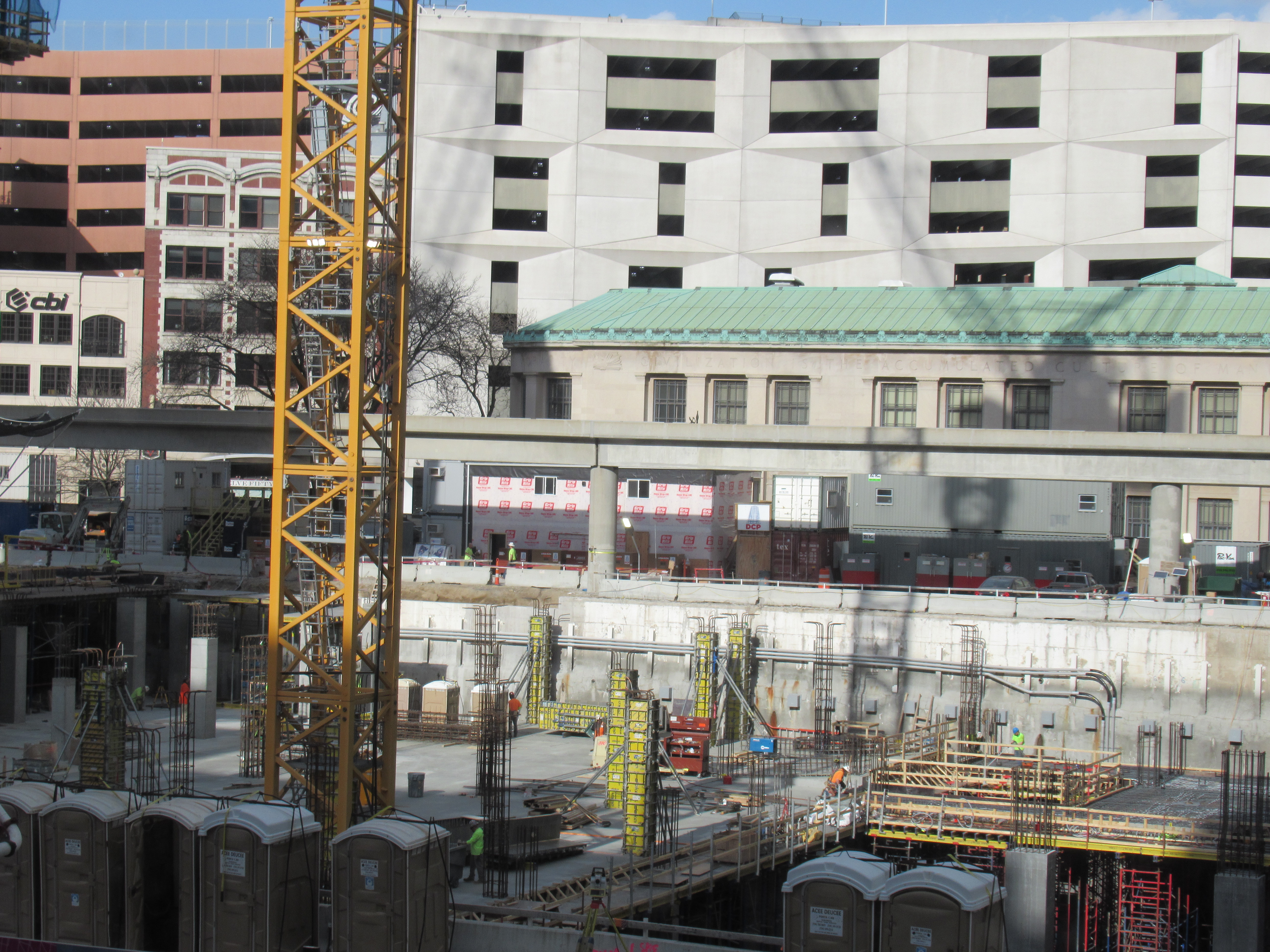
Early construction in April 2021

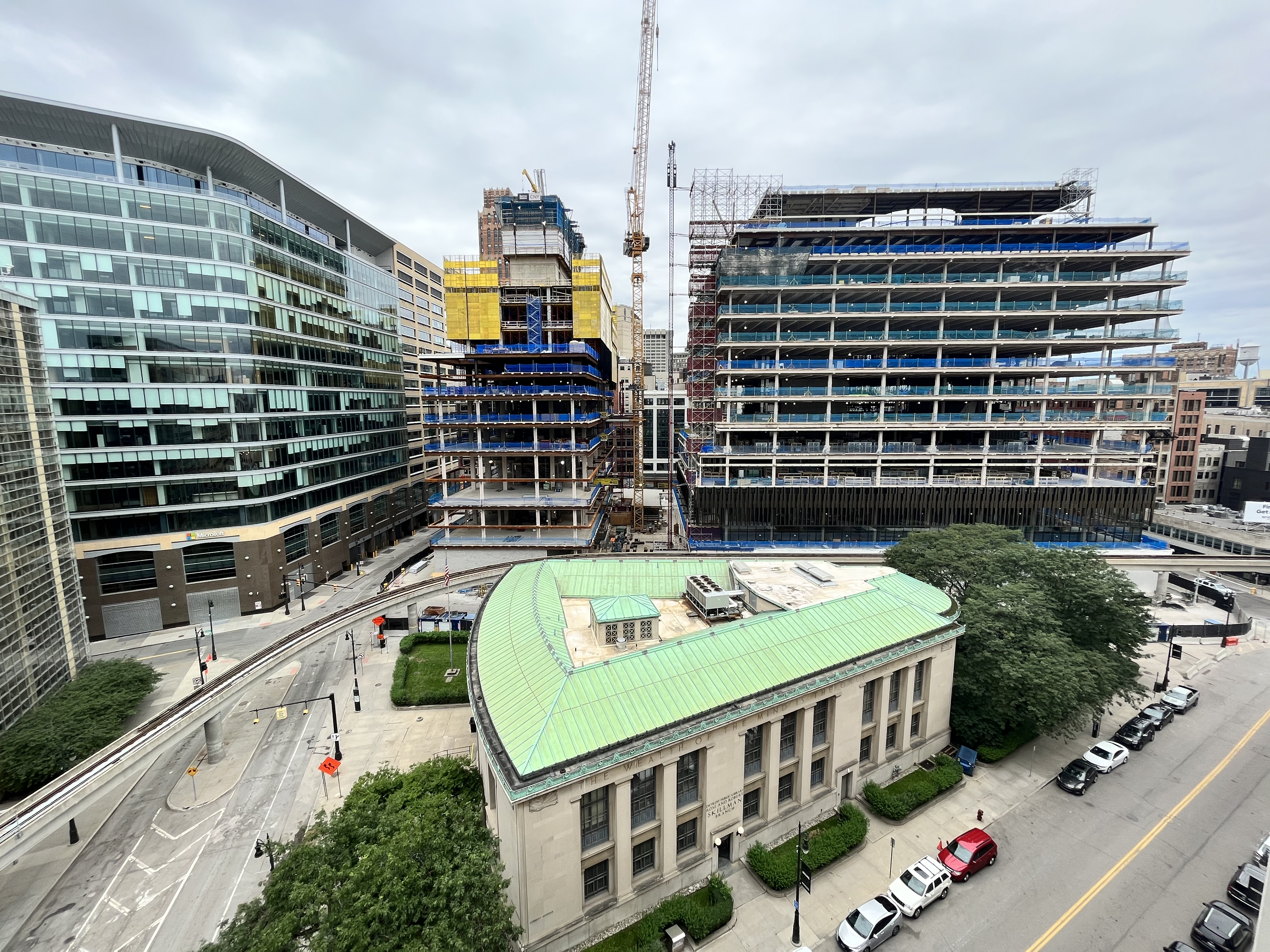
Both buildings under construction in August 2022

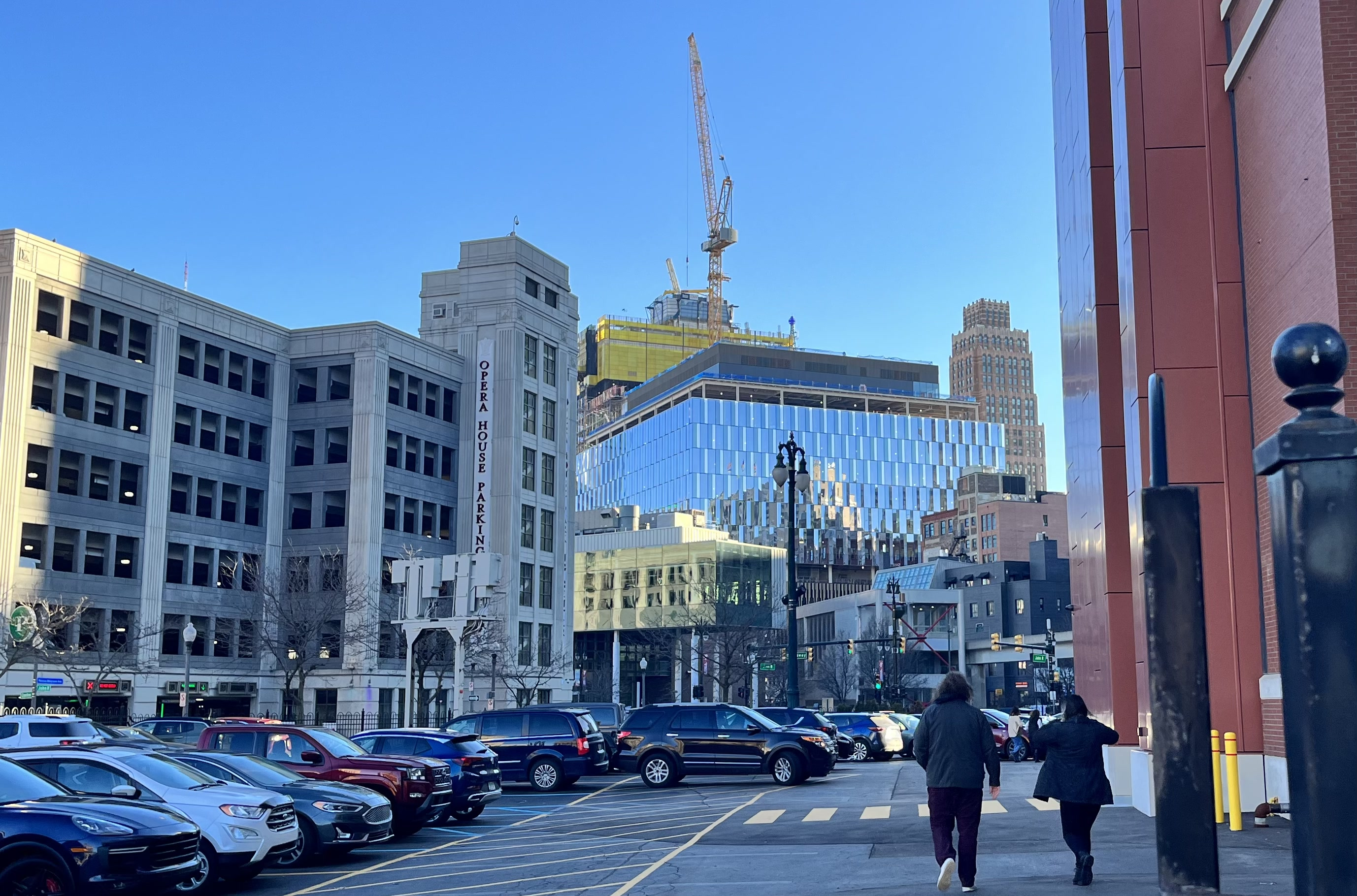
Progress as of February 2023, from Madison and John R Streets

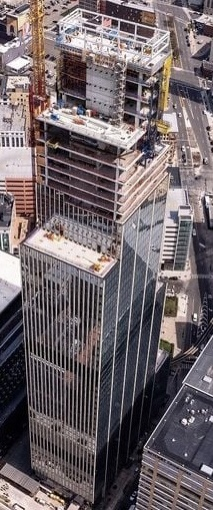
Tower under construction in April 2024
