= List of tallest buildings in Michigan =

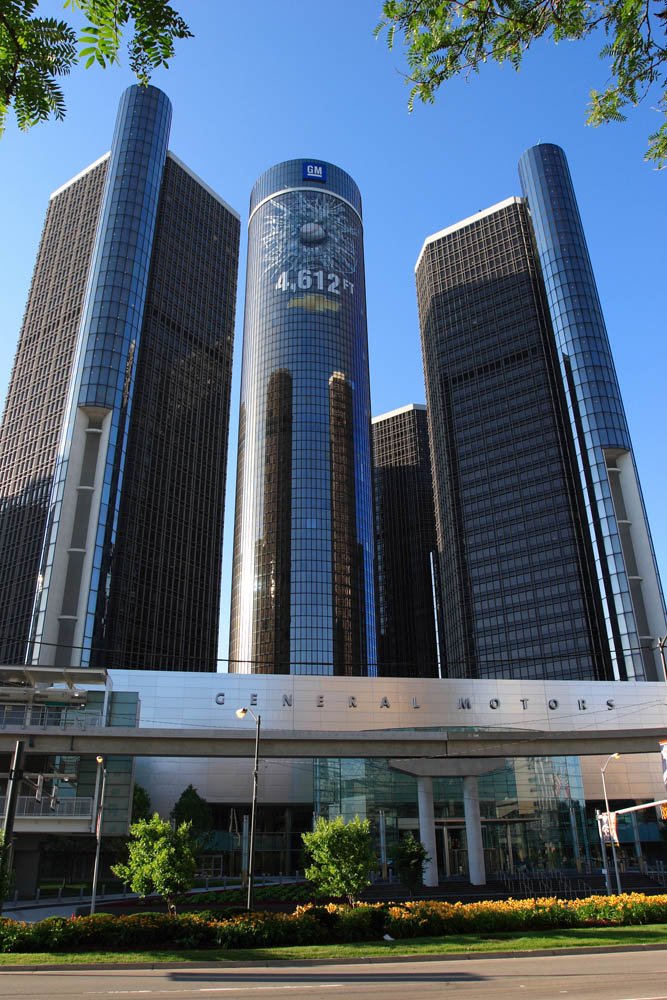
The Renaissance Center, Detroit.

The following is a list comprising the seventy-eight tallest skyscrapers in the U.S. state of Michigan. Skyscrapers are listed in descending order, from first to seventy-first. This tallest seventy-one includes completed, existing, free-standing skyscrapers. Height does not take into account subterranean floors, antennas, or other non-structural additions. There is also a timeline of the tallest buildings in Michigan and a timeline of the tallest skyscrapers. The Renaissance Center in Detroit, Michigan is the second tallest all-hotel skyscraper in the Western Hemisphere.

== Tallest skyscrapers ==
Was the tallest building in Michigan upon completion

Rank	Name	City	Year	Floors	Height feet / m	Image	Reference/Notes
1	Detroit Marriott at the Renaissance Center	Detroit	1977	73	727 / 222		Tallest building in Michigan
2	Hudson's Detroit (south tower)	Detroit	2024	49	685 / 208		
3	Ally Detroit Center	Detroit	1993	43	619 / 189		
4	Penobscot Building	Detroit	1928	47	565 / 172		
5-T	Renaissance Center Tower 100	Detroit	1977	39	522 / 159		
5-T	Renaissance Center Tower 200	Detroit	1977	39	522 / 159		
5-T	Renaissance Center Tower 300	Detroit	1977	39	522 / 159		
5-T	Renaissance Center Tower 400	Detroit	1977	39	522 / 159		
9	Guardian Building	Detroit	1929	40	496 / 151		
10	Book Tower	Detroit	1926	38	475 / 145		
11	150 West Jefferson	Detroit	1989	26	455 / 139		
12	Fisher Building	Detroit	1928	30	444 / 135		
13-T	Cadillac Tower	Detroit	1927	40	437 / 133		
13-T	David Stott Building	Detroit	1929	32	437 / 133		
15	One Woodward Avenue	Detroit	1963	28	430 / 131		
16	River House Condominiums	Grand Rapids	2008	34	406 / 124		Tallest building in Michigan outside of Detroit
17	3000 Town Center	Southfield	1975	32	402 / 122		Tallest building in Michigan outside of Detroit and Grand Rapids
18	1000 Town Center	Southfield	1989	28	395 / 120		
19	Patrick V. McNamara Federal Building	Detroit	1976	27	393 / 120		
20	DTE Energy Headquarters	Detroit	1971	25	374 / 114		
21	2000 Town Center	Southfield	1986	28	370 / 113		
22	David Broderick Tower	Detroit	1928	35	369 / 113		
23	211 West Fort Street	Detroit	1963	27	368 / 112		
24	Buhl Building	Detroit	1925	29	366 / 112		
25	Westin Book-Cadillac Hotel	Detroit	1924	29	349 / 106		
26	Hollywood Casino at Greektown	Detroit	2009	30	348 / 106		
27	PNC Center	Troy	1975	25	346 / 106		Tallest building in Troy
28	Plaza Towers	Grand Rapids	1991	34	345 / 105		
29	First National Building	Detroit	1930	26	341 / 104		
30-T	Renaissance Center Tower 500	Detroit	1977	21	339 / 103		
30-T	Renaissance Center Tower 600	Detroit	1977	21	339 / 103		
32	1001 Woodward	Detroit	1965	23	338 / 103		
33	American Center	Southfield	1975	25	331 / 101		
34	Millender Center	Detroit	1985	33	331 / 101		
35	5000 Town Center	Southfield	1983	33	328 / 100		
36	AT&T Building Addition	Detroit	1974	17	327 / 100		
37	Chrysler House	Detroit	1913	23	324 / 99		
38	Jeffersonian Apartments	Detroit	1965	30	322 / 99		
39	Tower on Grand	Lansing	2027	19	320 / 97.5		
40-T	Amway Grand Tower	Grand Rapids	1983	29	318 / 97		
40-T	Blue Cross/Blue Shield Service Center	Detroit	1971	22	318 / 97		
40-T	Coleman A. Young Municipal Center	Detroit	1954	20	318 / 97		
43	Huntington Bank Tower	Detroit	2022	20	311 / 95		
44	Penobscot Building Annex	Detroit	1913	23	310 / 94		
45-T	1300 Lafayette East Cooperative	Detroit	1961	30	305 / 93		
45-T	Riverfront Tower 300	Detroit	1983	21	305 / 93		
45-T	Riverfront Tower 200	Detroit	1983	21	305 / 93		
48	Boji Tower	Lansing	1931	23	297 / 90.5		Tallest building in Lansing
49-T	Executive Plaza	Detroit	1967	22	290 / 88		
49-T	The Residences Water Square	Detroit	2024	25	290 / 88		
51	Ford Building	Detroit	1909	19	275 / 84		
52	MotorCity Casino Hotel	Detroit	2007	12	273 / 83		
53	David Whitney Building	Detroit	1916	19	272 / 83		
54	Bridgewater Place	Grand Rapids	1993	18	271 / 83		
55-T	Studio Park Tower	Grand Rapids	2024	22	270 / 82		
55-T	4000 Town Center	Southfield	1979	20	270 / 82		
57-T	Tower Plaza	Ann Arbor	1969	26	267 / 81		Tallest building in Ann Arbor
57-T	Michigan State Capitol	Lansing	1879	4	267 / 81		
59-T	Fort Street Presbyterian Church	Detroit	1855	1	265 / 81		Tallest church in Michigan
59-T	Detroit City Club Apartments	Detroit	1981	28	265 / 81		
61	Shore Club Skytower	Saint Clair Shores	1965	26	260 / 79		Tallest building in Saint Clair Shores
62-T	McKay Tower	Grand Rapids	1927	16	259 / 79		
62-T	Water Board Building	Detroit	1928	24	259 / 79		
64	Riverfront Tower 100	Detroit	1991	26	257 / 78		
65-T	JW Marriott Grand Rapids	Grand Rapids	2007	23	256 / 78		
65-T	Travelers Tower I	Southfield	1971	18	256 / 78		
67	Washington Boulevard Apartments	Detroit	1923	21	255 / 78		
68	One Towne Square	Southfield	1992	21	253 / 77		
69	Charles Stewart Mott Foundation Building	Flint	1929	16	250/76		
70	Henry Ford Hospital Apartments	Detroit	1976	21	250 / 76		
71	Grand Park Centre	Detroit	1922	19	250 / 76		
72	Chrysler Headquarters	Auburn Hills	1996	15	249 / 76		Tallest building in Auburn Hills
73-T	St. Florian Catholic Church	Hamtramck	1928	1	247 / 75		Tallest church in Michigan outside Detroit
73-T	Wayne County Building	Detroit	1902	13	247 / 75		
75	Fort Ponchartrain - A Wyndham Hotel	Detroit	1965	25	245 / 75		
76-T	DoubleTree Suites - Fort Shelby	Detroit	1917	22	242 / 74		
76-T	Henry Ford Hospital	Detroit	1965	17	242 / 74		
78	Louis Kamper Building	Detroit	1926	22	240 / 73		
79	The Milton	Battle Creek	1931	19	238 / 72.5		Tallest building in Battle Creek
80- T	Hudson's Detroit (north tower)	Detroit	2023	14	232 / 71		
80-T	One Campus Martius	Detroit	2003	16	232 / 71		
80-T	Michigan Central Station	Detroit	1913	18	232 / 71		
80-T	Battle Creek Tower	Battle Creek	1931	21	232 / 71		

== Timeline of tallest buildings ==
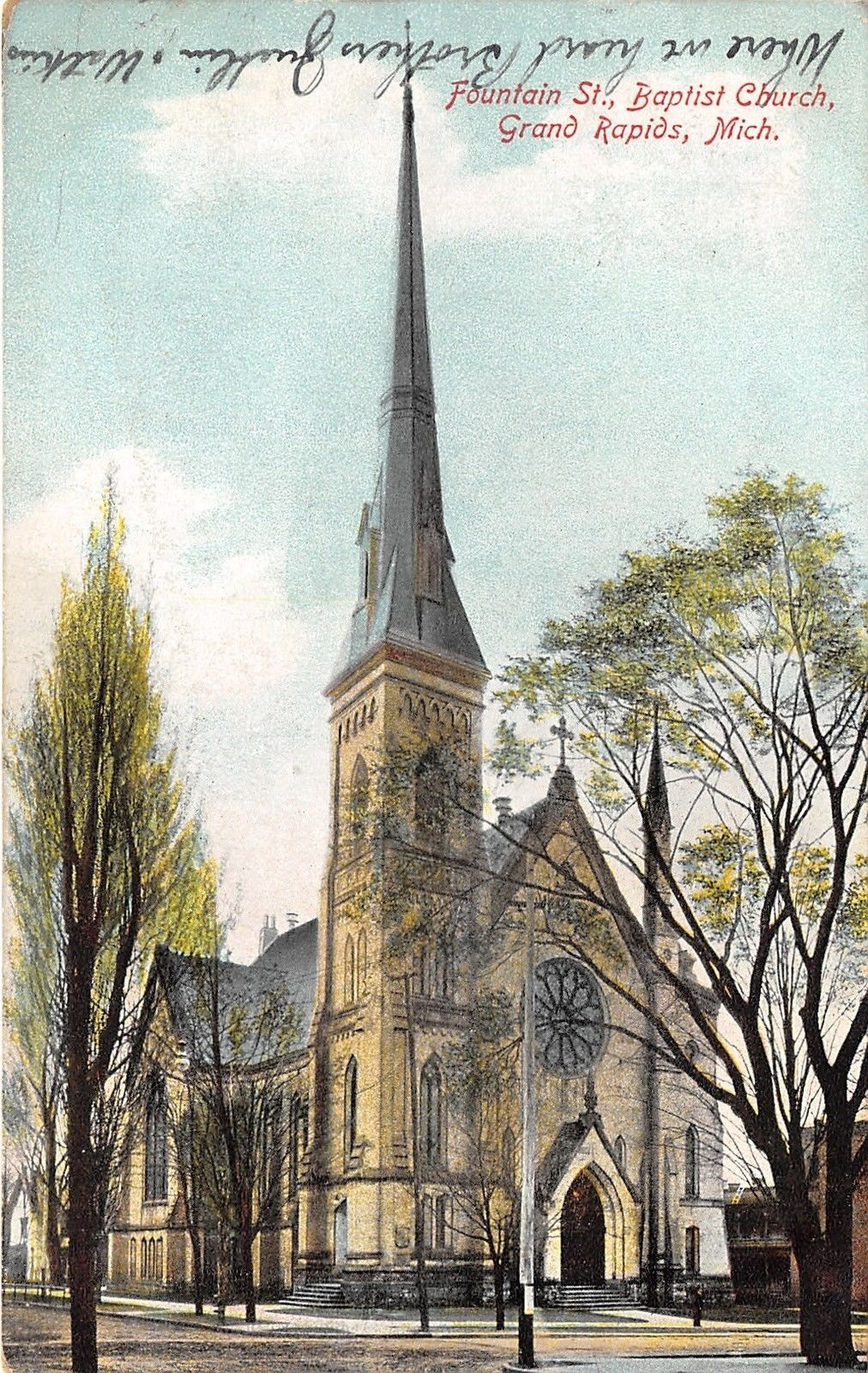
Fountain Street Baptist Church, Grand Rapids, MI 1908

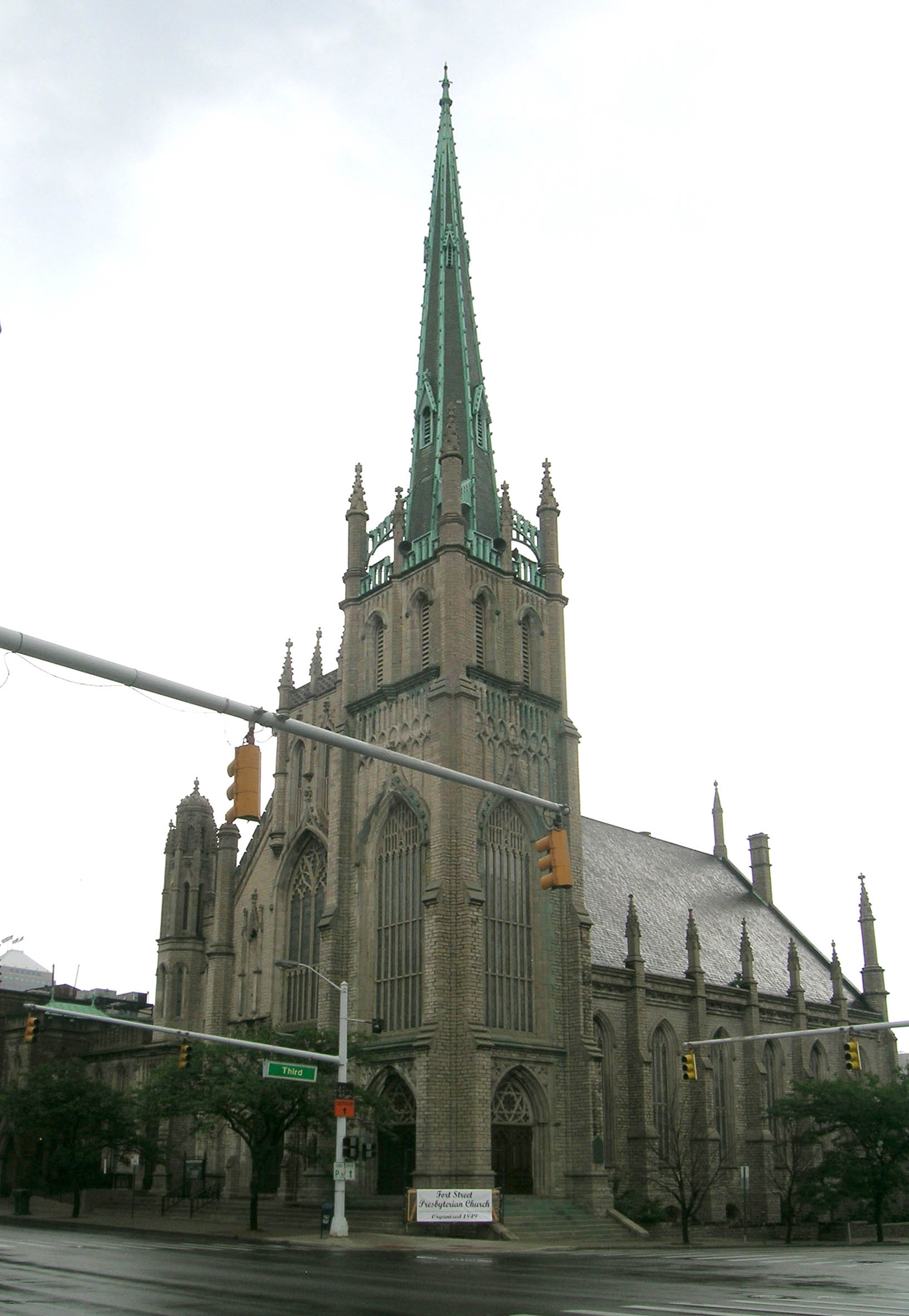
Fort Street Presbyterian Church.

The following is a list of the tallest buildings in the U.S. state of Michigan on a year-to-year basis. The chart below shows the building, years as tallest, and its height.

Name	Address	Years as tallest	Height feet / m	Floors	Reference
First Michigan State Capitol	Capitol Park, Detroit, MI	1828–1866	140 / 43	2	
Most Holy Trinity Church	1050 Porter Street, Detroit, MI	1866–1871	170 / 52	1	
Former Detroit City Hall	Campus Martius Park, Detroit, MI	1871–1877	200 / 61	4	
Fountain Street Baptist Church	24 Fountain St NE, Grand Rapids, MI	1877	217 / 66	1	
Fort Street Presbyterian Church	631 West Fort Street, Detroit, MI	1877–1909	265 / 81	1	
Ford Building	615 Griswold Street, Detroit, MI	1909–1913	275 / 84	19	
Penobscot Building Annex	144 West Congress Street, Detroit, MI	1913	310 / 95	23	
Chrysler House	719 Griswold Street, Detroit, MI	1913–1924	324 / 99	23	
Book-Cadillac Hotel	220 Michigan Avenue, Detroit, MI	1924–1925	349 / 106	29	
Buhl Building	535 Griswold Street, Detroit, MI	1925–1926	366 / 112	29	
Book Tower	1265 Washington Boulevard, Detroit, MI	1926–1928	475 / 145	38	
Penobscot Building	633 Griswold Street, Detroit, MI	1928–1977	565 / 172	47	
Detroit Marriott at the Renaissance Center	1 Renaissance Center Drive, Detroit, MI	1977–present	727 / 222	73 (Note: General Motors, the owner of the Detroit Marriott at the Renaissance Center, maintains that the building has 73 floors. Hines Interests, the property management firm for the building, gives a floor count of 74, while architect Skidmore, Owings and Merrill gives a floor count of 75. Emporis and other building database sites usually give the floor count as 70, while other sources state 73 stories. This table uses the floor count of 73 as stated officially by the building's owner.)	

== Timeline of tallest skyscrapers ==
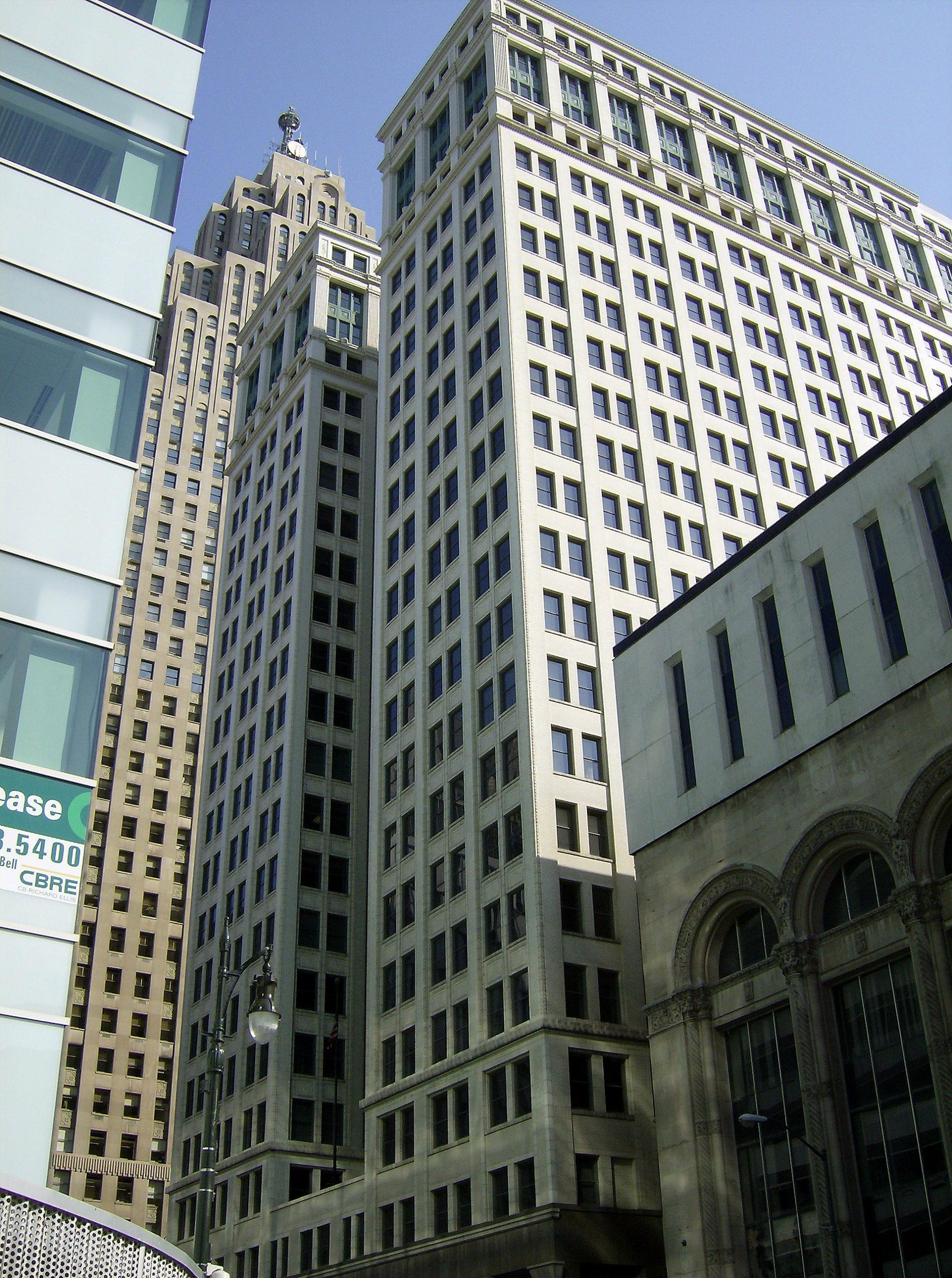
The Chrysler House in the Detroit Financial District.

The following is a list of the tallest skyscrapers in the U.S. state of Michigan on a year-to-year basis. The chart below shows the skyscraper, its height, when it was completed, how long it was the tallest, and what skyscraper surpassed it. The Frank & Seder (1881) is considered Detroit's oldest existing iron-framed tall building. The Hammond Building (1889) is considered Detroit's first steel-framed skyscraper, though it is now demolished. Detroit's oldest existing steel-framed skyscraper is the 12-story United Way Community Services Building (1895) at 1212 Griswold, originally known as the Chamber of Commerce Building.

Name	City	Height feet / m	Year	Period	Surpassed by
Frank & Seder Building	Detroit	135 / 41	1881	8 years	Hammond Building
Hammond Building	Detroit	150 / 46	1889	6 years	United Way Community Services Building
United Way Community Services Building	Detroit	160 / 49	1895	1 year	Majestic Building
Majestic Building	Detroit	223 / 68	1896	13 years	Ford Building
Ford Building	Detroit	275 / 84	1909	4 years	Penobscot Annex
Penobscot Annex	Detroit	310 / 94	1913	<1 year	Chrysler House
Chrysler House	Detroit	324 / 99	1913	12 years	Book-Cadillac Hotel
Book-Cadillac Hotel	Detroit	349 / 106	1925	<1 year	Buhl Building
Buhl Building	Detroit	366 / 112	1925	1 year	Book Tower
Book Tower	Detroit	475 / 145	1926	2 years	Penobscot Building
Penobscot Building	Detroit	565 / 172	1928	49 years	Renaissance Center
Renaissance Center	Detroit	727 / 222	1977	currently	incumbent

== See also ==
- List of tallest buildings in Detroit
- List of tallest buildings in Grand Rapids
- List of tallest buildings by U.S. state
- List of tallest buildings in the United States
- List of tallest buildings in Lansing
