= List of tallest buildings in Grand Rapids =

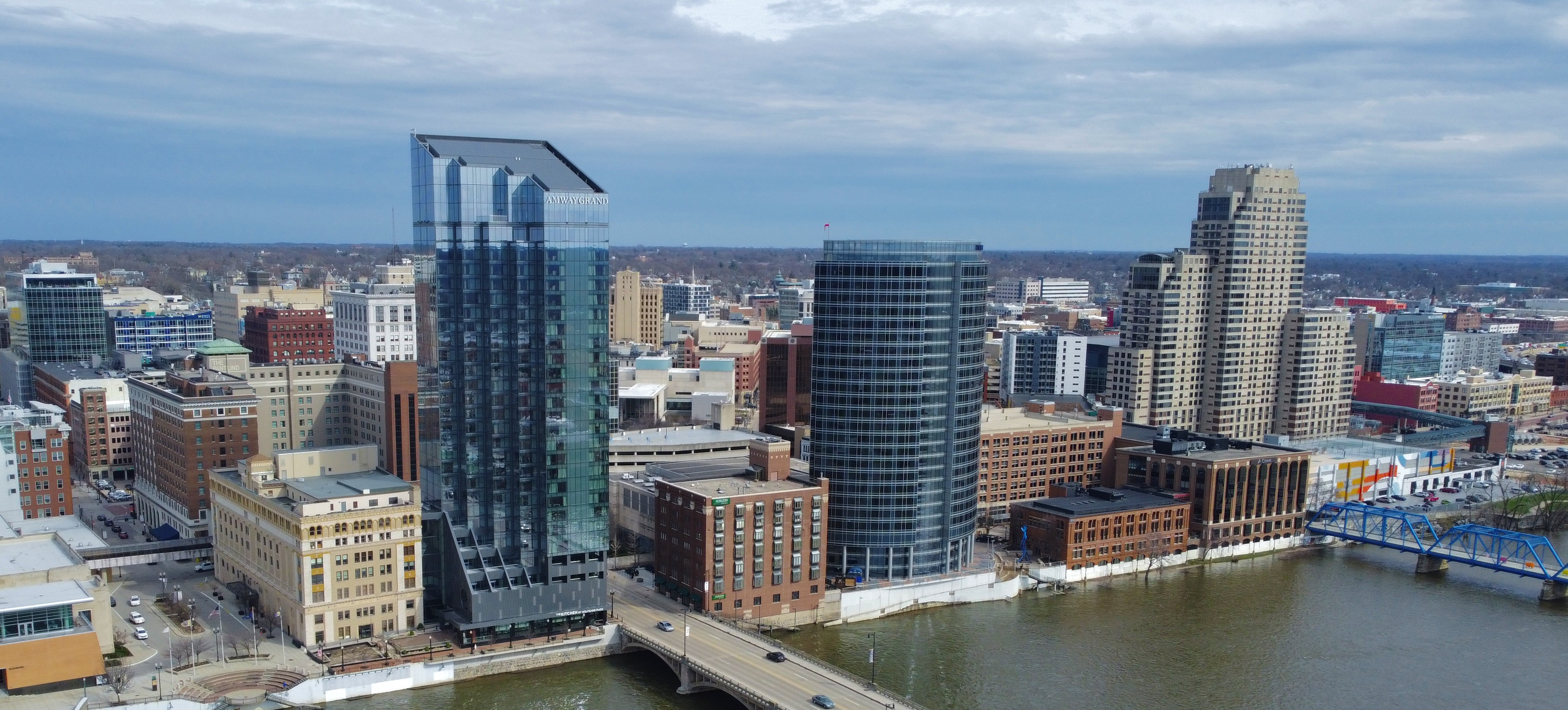
High-rises in downtown Grand Rapids.

This list of tallest buildings in Grand Rapids ranks buildings in the U.S. city of Grand Rapids, Michigan by height. The tallest building in Grand Rapids is the River House Condominiums, which stands 406 feet (124 m) tall.

== Tallest buildings ==
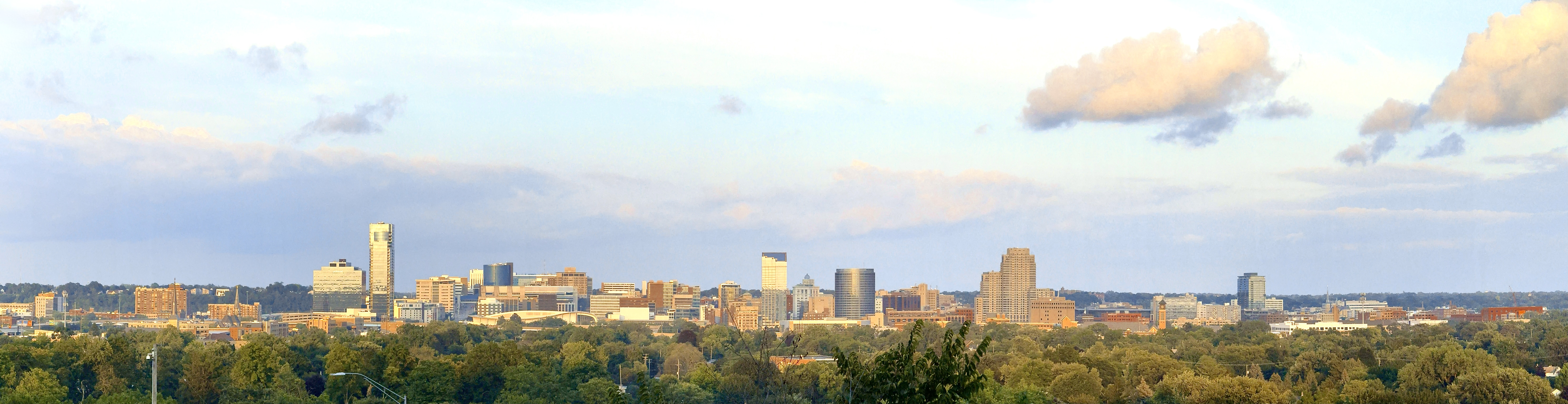
Grand Rapids skyline in 2024

This lists ranks Grand Rapids buildings that stand at least 150 feet (46 m) tall, based on standard height measurement. This includes spires and architectural details, but does not include antenna masts. Existing structures are included for ranking purposes.

Rank	Name	Image	Height feet / m	Floors	Year	Notes
1	River House		406 / 124	33	2008	Tallest building in Michigan outside of Detroit and the tallest residential building in Michigan. Part of Bridgewater Place complex, one of two buildings.
2	Plaza Towers		345 / 105	34	1991	Held the title as the tallest building in Grand Rapids from 1991 until 2008.
3	Amway Grand Plaza Hotel		318 / 97	28	1983	Held the title as the tallest building in Grand Rapids from 1983 until 1991.
4	Bridgewater Place		272 / 83	18	1993	Part of Bridgewater place complex, one of two buildings.
5	Studio Park Tower		260 / 79	22	2024	Officially opened October 22, 2024 with a ribbon cutting ceremony.
6	McKay Tower		259 / 79	16	1927	Held the title as the tallest building in Grand Rapids from 1927 until 1983, the longest held title of 56 years.
7	JW Marriott Grand Rapids		257 / 78	23	2007	
8	Kent County Courthouse		206 / 63	13	2001	
9=	Cathedral of Saint Andrew		192 / 59	1	1876	
9=	Warner Building		192 / 59	15	2019	
11	77 Monroe Center NW		182 / 55.5	13	1926	
12	First Community Bank Building		180 / 55	13	1916	
13	Gallery on Fulton		175 / 53	14	2010	
14	601 Bond		172 / 52	16	2019	
15	St Mary's Catholic Church		166 / 51	1	1884	Early estimates were approximate
16	Campau Square Plaza Building		164 / 50	12	1985	
17	10 Ionia		162 / 49	13	2021	
18	Fountain Street Baptist Church		158 / 48	1	1924	
19=	Helen DeVos Children's Hospital		155 / 47	11	2011	
19=	St. James Catholic Church		155 / 47	1	1872	
21=	Morton House Apartments		154 / 47	13	1923	
21=	Michigan Trust Company Building		154 / 47	11	1928	
23	20 Fulton Street East		153 / 46	12	2017	
24=	Basilica of St. Adalbert		150 / 46	-	1913	
24=	Amway Grand Plaza Hotel (Pantlind Hotel)		150 / 46	12	1915	
26	PNC Bank Building		~150 / ~46	10	1982	

== Timeline of tallest buildings ==
Name	Image	Height feet / m	Floors	Year	Notes
River House		406 / 124	34	2008–present	
Plaza Towers		345 / 105	34	1991–2008	
Amway Grand Plaza Hotel		318 / 97	29	1983–1991	
McKay Tower		259 / 79	18	1927–1983	
Cathedral of Saint Andrew		192 / 59	1	1917–1927	Assumed title following 1917 Fountain Street Baptist Church fire.
Fountain Street Baptist Church		217 / 66	1	1877–1917	Tallest building in Michigan from April 1877 to June 1877 until the completion of Fort Street Presbyterian Church in Detroit, MI. Destroyed by fire in 1917.
First Congregational Church		190 / 58	1	1869–1877	
Central School		137 / 42	3	1867–1869	
Saint Andrew's Church		100 / 30	1	1849–1867	
Campau's Mansion		55 / 17	4	1837–1849	
Calkins Law Office		20 / 6	1	1836–1837	

== See also ==
- List of tallest buildings in Michigan
- List of tallest buildings in Lansing
- List of tallest buildings in Detroit
