= History of Grand Rapids, Michigan =

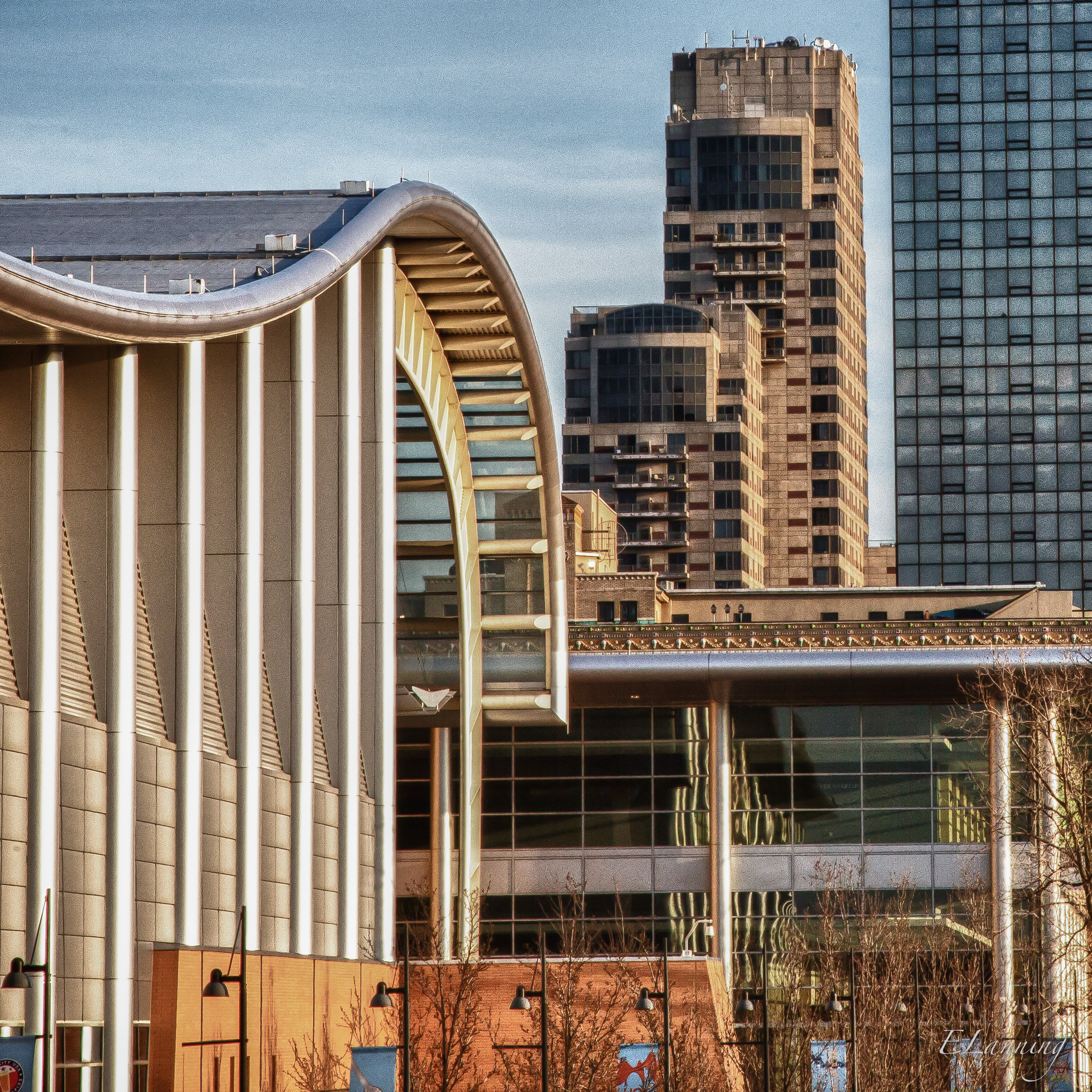
Buildings lining the Grand River, the origin of the city's name.

The recorded history of Grand Rapids in the U.S. state of Michigan, began with settlers in 1806.

== Pre-Columbian settlement ==
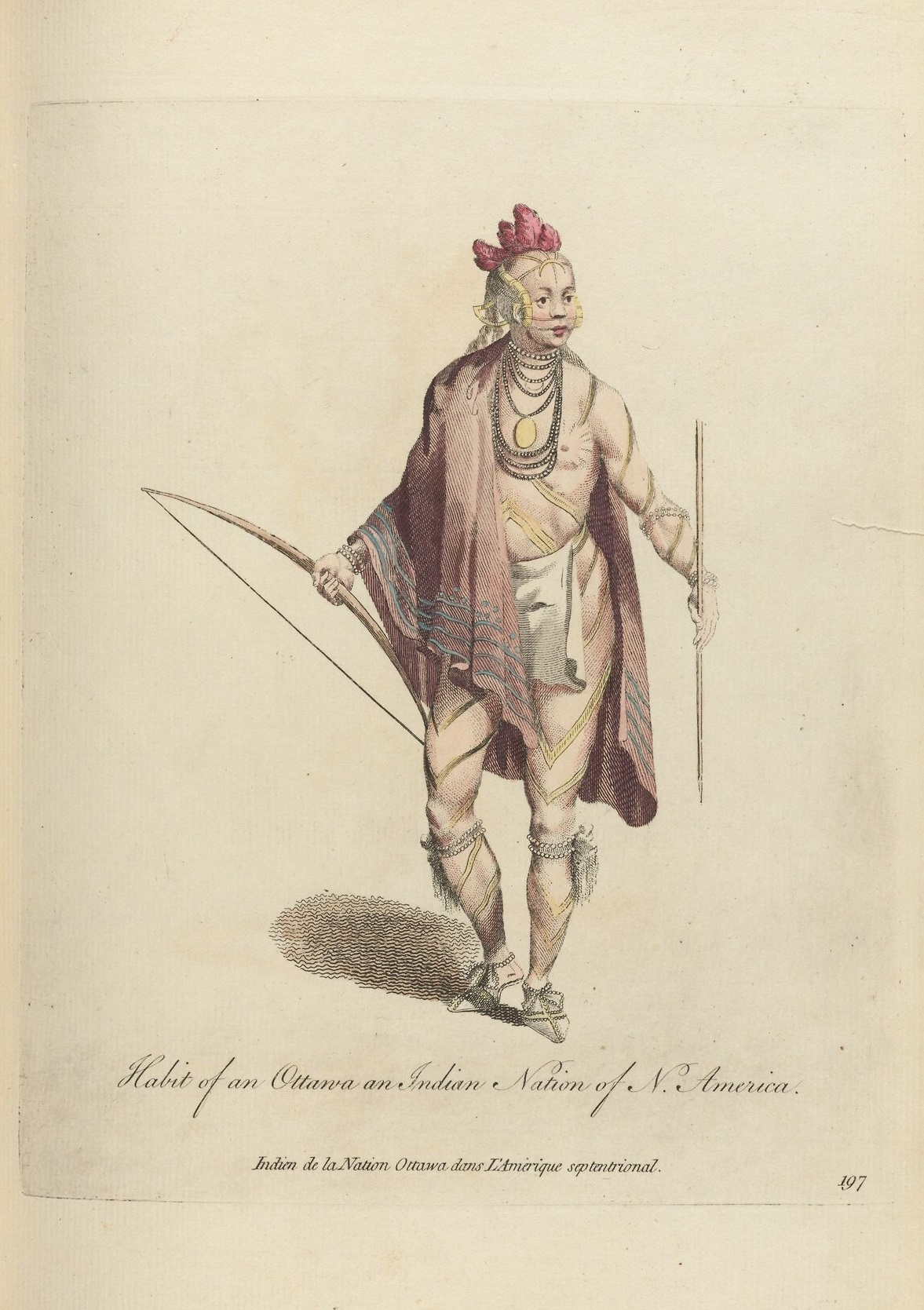
A 1772 engraving showing Ottawa attire of the period.

For thousands of years, succeeding cultures of indigenous peoples occupied the area. Over 2000 years ago, people associated with the Hopewell culture occupied the Grand River Valley. Later, a tribe from the Ottawa River traveled to the Grand River valley, fighting three battles with the Prairie Indians who were established in the area. The tribe later split, with the Chippewas settling in the northern lower peninsula, the Pottawatomies staying south of the Kalamazoo River and the Ottawa staying in central Michigan.

By the late 1600s, the Ottawa, who occupied territory around the Great Lakes and spoke one of the numerous Algonquian languages, moved into the Grand Rapids area and founded several villages along the Grand River. The Ottawa established on the river, which they called O-wash-ta-nong, or far-away-water due to the river's length, where they "raised corn, melons, pumpkins and beans, to which they added game of the woods and the fish from the streams".

In 1740, an Ottawa man who would later be known as Chief Noonday and become the future chief of the Ottawa, was born. Between 1761 and 1763, Chief Pontiac visited the area annually, gathering over 3,000 natives and asking them to volunteer to lay siege to the British fort in Detroit, which would culminate into Pontiac's War. The Potawatomi attacked the Ottawa in 1765, attempting to take the Grand River territory but were defeated. By the end of the 1700s, there were an estimated 1,000 Ottawa in the Kent County area.

== European settlement ==
After the French established territories in Michigan, Jesuit missionaries and traders traveled down Lake Michigan and its tributaries. At the start of the 19th century, European fur traders (mostly French Canadian and Métis) and missionaries established posts in the area among the Ottawa. They generally lived in peace, trading European metal and textile goods for fur pelts.

In 1806, Joseph and his wife Madeline La Framboise, who was Métis, traveled by canoe from Mackinac and established the first trading post in West Michigan in present-day Grand Rapids on the banks of the Grand River, near what is now Ada Township. They were French-speaking and Roman Catholic. They likely both spoke Ottawa, Madeline's maternal ancestral language. After the murder of her husband in 1809 while en route to Grand Rapids, Madeline La Framboise carried on the trade business, expanding fur trading posts to the west and north, creating a good reputation among the American Fur Company. La Framboise, whose mother was Ottawa and father French, later merged her successful operations with the American Fur Company. By 1810, Chief Noonday established a village on the west side of the river with about 500 Ottawa.

Madeline La Framboise retired the trading post to Rix Robinson in 1821 and returned to Mackinac. That year, Grand Rapids was described as being the home of an Ottawa village of about 50 to 60 huts on the west side of the river near the 5th Ward, with Kewkishkam being the village chief and Chief Noonday being the chief of the Ottawa.

== American settlement ==
The first permanent European-American settler in the Grand Rapids area was Isaac McCoy, a Baptist minister. General Lewis Cass, who commissioned Charles Christopher Trowbridge to establish missions for Native Americans in Michigan, ordered McCoy to establish a mission in Grand Rapids for the Ottawa. In 1823, McCoy, as well as Paget, a Frenchman who brought along a Native American pupil, traveled to Grand Rapids to arrange a mission, though negotiations fell through with the group returning to the Carey mission for the Potawatomi on the St. Joseph River.

In 1824, Baptist missionary Rev. L. Slater traveled with two settlers to Grand Rapids to perform work. The winter of 1824 proved to be difficult, with Slater's group having to resupply and return before the spring. Slater then erected the first settler structures in Grand Rapids, a log cabin for himself and a log schoolhouse. In 1825, McCoy returned and established a missionary station. He represented the settlers who began arriving from Ohio, New York and New England, the Yankee states of the Northern Tier.

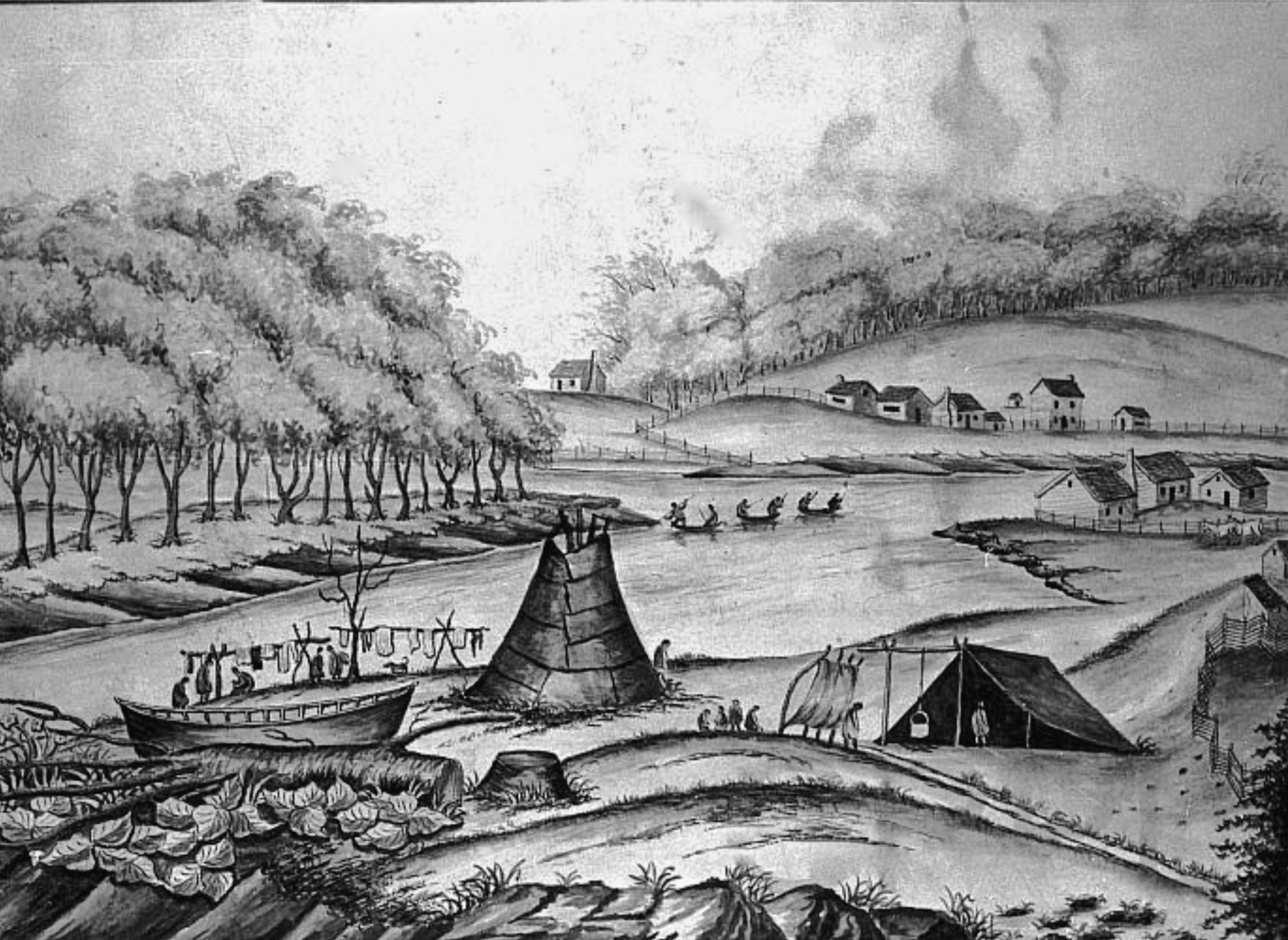
A sketch of Grand Rapids in 1831. The collection of houses across the river on its west side is the Baptist mission. The three buildings in the middle right are Louis Campau's trading post.

Shortly after, Detroit-born Louis Campau, known as the official founder of Grand Rapids, was convinced by fur trader William Brewster, who was in a rivalry with the American Fur Company, to travel to Grand Rapids and establish trade there. In 1826, Campau built his cabin, trading post, and blacksmith shop on the east bank of the Grand River near the rapids, stating that the Native Americans in the area were "friendly and peaceable". Campau returned to Detroit, then returned a year later with his wife and $5,000 of trade goods to trade with the Ottawa and Ojibwa, with the only currency being fur. Campau's younger brother Touissant would often assist him with trade and other tasks at hand.

In 1831 the federal survey of the Northwest Territory reached the Grand River; it set the boundaries for Kent County, named after prominent New York jurist James Kent. In 1833, a land office was established in White Pigeon, Michigan, with Campau and fellow settler Luther Lincoln seeking land in the Grand River valley. Lincoln purchased land in what is now known as Grandville, while Campau became perhaps the most important settler when he bought 72 acres (291,000 m^{2}) from the federal government for $90 and named his tract Grand Rapids. Over time, it developed as today's main downtown business district. In the spring of 1833, Campau sold Joel Guild, who traveled from New York, a plot of land for $25.00, with Guild building the first frame structure in Grand Rapids, which is now where McKay Tower stands. Guild later became the postmaster, with mail at the time being delivered monthly from the Gull Lake, Michigan to Grand Rapids. Grand Rapids in 1833 was only a few acres of land cleared on each side of the Grand River, with oak trees planted in light, sandy soil standing between what is now Lyon Street and Fulton Street.

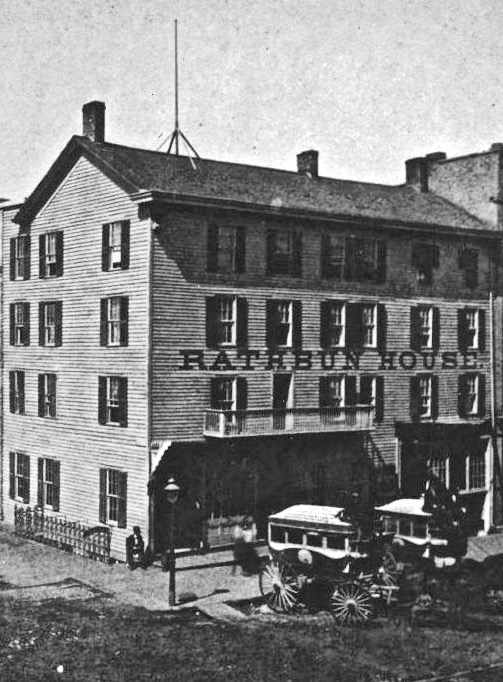
The large framed building constructed by Campau in 1834, seen in this image converted into part of the Rathbun House.

By 1834, the settlement had become more organized. Rev. Turner had established a school on the east side of the river, with children on the west side of the river being brought to school every morning by a Native American on a canoe who would shuttle them across the river. Multiple events happened at Guild's frame structure, including the first marriage in the city, one that involved his daughter Harriet Guild and Barney Burton, as well as the first town meeting that had nine voters. It was also this year Campau began constructing his own frame building—the largest at the time—near where present-day Rosa Parks Circle.

In 1835, many settlers arrived in the area with the population growing to about 50 people, including its first doctor, Dr. Wilson, who was supplied with equipment from Campau. Lucius Lyon, a Yankee Protestant who would later become a rival to Campau arrived in Grand Rapids who purchased the rest of the prime land and called his plot the Village of Kent. When Lyon and his partner N. O. Sergeant returned after their purchase, they arrived along with a posse of men carrying shovels and picks, with the goal of building a mill race. The posse arrived to the music of a bugle, startling the settlement with Chief Noonday offering Campau assistance to drive back Lyon's posse believing they were invaders. Also that year, Rev. Andrew Vizoisky, a Hungarian native educated in Catholic institutions in Austria, arrived, presiding over the Catholic mission in the area until his death in 1852.

That year, Campau, Rix Robinson, Rev. Slater and the husband of Chief Noonday's daughter, Meccissininni (Migiziinini, "Eagle-Man"), traveled to Washington, D.C. to speak about the purchase of Ottawa land on the west side of the river with President Andrew Jackson. Jackson was originally unimpressed with Meccissininni, though Meccissininni, who often acquired white customs, asked Jackson for a similar suit to the one the president was wearing. While later wearing his suit that was made similar to Jackson's, Meccissininni also unknowingly imitated Jackson's hat, placing a piece of weed in it, which impressed Jackson since it symbolized mourning the death of his wife.

John Ball, representing a group of New York land speculators, bypassed Detroit for a better deal in Grand Rapids traveling to the settlement in 1836. Ball declared the Grand River valley "the promised land, or at least the most promising one for my operations". That year, the first steam boat was constructed on the Grand River named the Gov. Mason, though the ship wrecked two years later in Muskegon. Yankee migrants (primarily English-speaking settlers) and others began migrating from New York and New England through the 1830s. Ancestors of these people included not only English colonists but people of mixed ethnic Dutch, Mohawk, French Canadian, and French Huguenot descent from the colonial period in New York. However, after 1837, the area saw poor times, with many of the French returning to their places of origin, with poverty hitting the area for the next few years.

The first Grand Rapids newspaper, The Grand River Times, was printed on April 18, 1837, describing the village's attributes, stating:

Though young in its improvements, the site of this village has long been known, and esteemed for its natural advantages. It was here that the Indian traders long since made their great depot.

The Grand River Times continued, saying the village had grown quickly from a few French families to about 1,200 residents, the Grand River was "one of the most important and delightful to be found in the country", and described the changing Native American culture in the area.

== City of Grand Rapids ==
=== 1800s ===
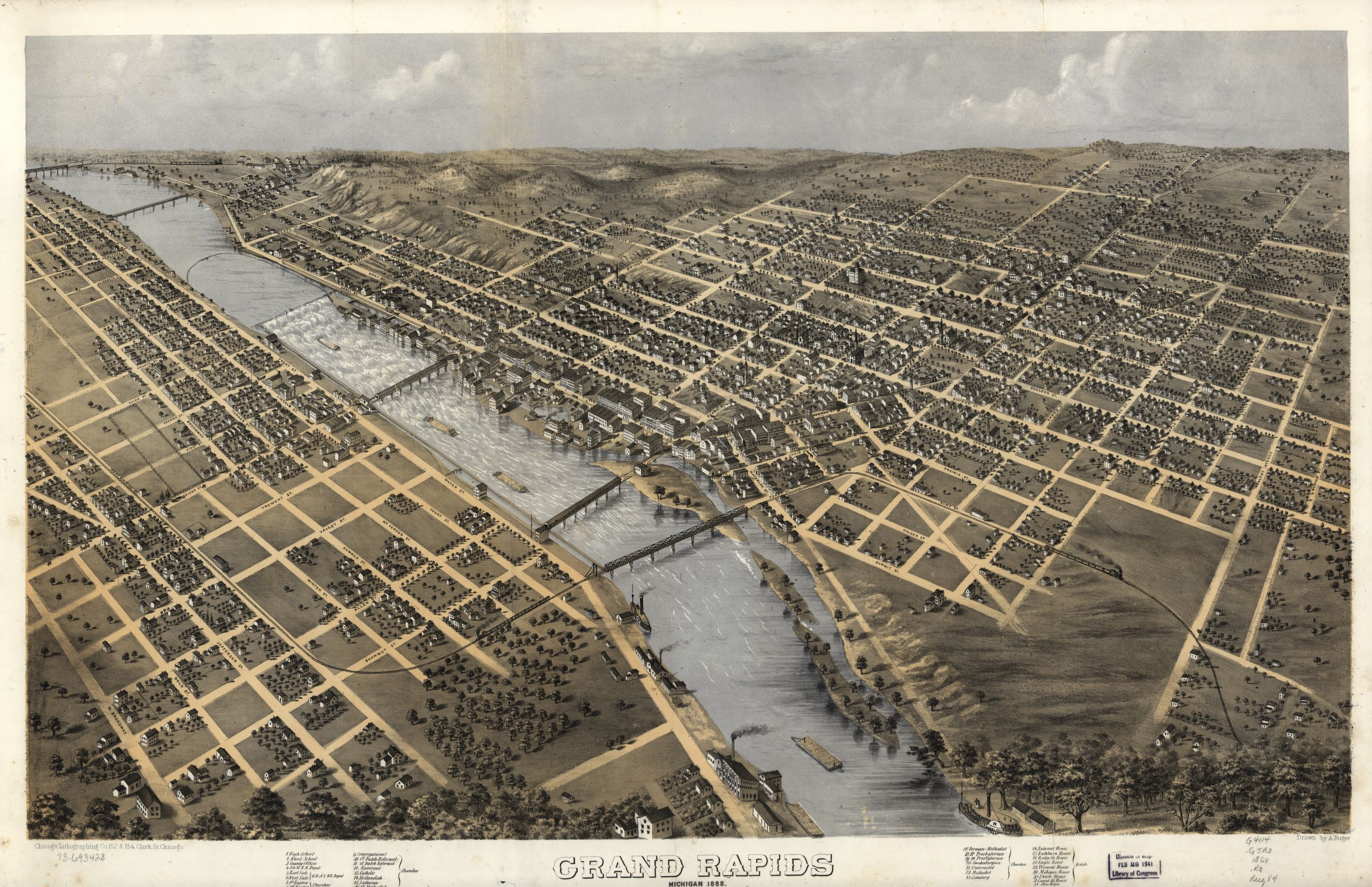
An 1868 pictorial map of Grand Rapids.

By 1838, the settlement incorporated as a village, and encompassed approximately three-quarters of a mile (1 km). The first formal census in 1845 recorded a population of 1,510 and an area of 4 square miles (10 km^{2}). The city of Grand Rapids was incorporated April 2, 1850. It was officially established on May 2, 1850, when the village of Grand Rapids voted to accept the proposed city charter. The population at the time was 2,686. By 1857, the city of Grand Rapids' area totaled 10.5 square miles (27 km^{2}). In October 1870, Grand Rapids became a desired location for immigrants, with about 120 Swedes arriving in the United States to travel and create a "colony" in the area in one week.

In 1880, the country's first hydro-electric generator was put to use on the city's west side. Grand Rapids was an early center for the automobile industry, as the Austin Automobile Company operated here from 1901 until 1921.

==== Gypsum mining ====
An outcropping of gypsum, where Plaster Creek enters the Grand River, was known to the Native American inhabitants of the area. Pioneer geologist Douglass Houghton commented on this find in 1838. Settlers began to mine this outcrop in 1841, initially in open cast mines, but later underground mines as well. Gypsum was ground locally for use as a soil amendment known as "land plaster."

The Alabastine Mine in nearby Wyoming, Michigan, was originally dug in 1907 to provide gypsum for the manufacture of stucco and wall coverings, notably the alabastine favored by Arts and Crafts Movement architects. The mine has since been converted to a storage facility primarily used for computer servers and Kent County document storage.

=== 1900s ===
In 1945, Grand Rapids became the first city in the United States to add fluoride to its drinking water. Downtown Grand Rapids, when the center of business, used to host four department stores: Herpolsheimer's (Lazarus in 1987), Jacobson's, Steketee's (founded in 1862), and Wurzburg's. Shopping was a community event. As with many older cities, these businesses suffered as the population moved to suburbs in the postwar era with federal subsidization of highway construction. In addition, retail changes in buying habits affected business. Consolidation of department stores occurred here and nationally in the 1980s and 1990s.

==== Furniture City ====
During the second half of the 19th century, the city became a major lumbering center, processing timber harvested in the region. Logs were floated down the Grand River to be milled in the city and shipped via the Great Lakes. The city became a center of fine wood products as well. By the end of the century, it was established as the premier furniture-manufacturing city of the United States. It was nicknamed "Furniture City" and exhibited many of its products at the Centennial Exposition in Philadelphia. "After an international exhibition in Philadelphia in 1876, Grand Rapids became recognized worldwide as a leader in the production of fine furniture."

This event in Philadelphia, attended by hundreds of thousands of people, helped spark the Colonial Revival movement in American furniture. "Grand Rapids furniture" became a byword for well-made reproductions of American and English 18th and early 19th-century styles. Furniture companies included the William A. Berkey Company and its successors, Baker Furniture Company, Williams-Kimp, and Widdicomb Furniture Company. The Grand Rapids Furniture Record was the trade paper for the city's industry. Its industries provided jobs for many new immigrants from Europe in the late 19th and early 20th century, and a Polish neighborhood developed on the west side of the city.

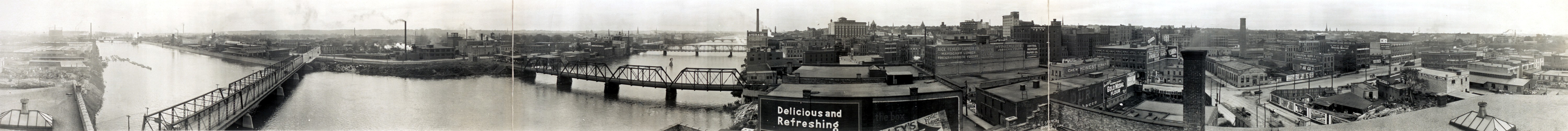
A 1915 panorama, when the furniture industry peaked before the Great Depression.

A furniture-makers' guild was established in 1931 to improve the design and craftsmanship of Grand Rapids furniture. National home furnishing markets were held in Grand Rapids for about 75 years, concluding in the 1960s. By that time, the furniture-making industry had largely shifted to North Carolina.

Although local employment in the industry is lower than at its historic peak, Grand Rapids remains a leading city in office furniture production. It incorporated trends to use steel and other manufactured materials in furniture, with ergonomic designs for chairs, computer stations, and other furnishings.
