= List of tallest buildings in Lansing =

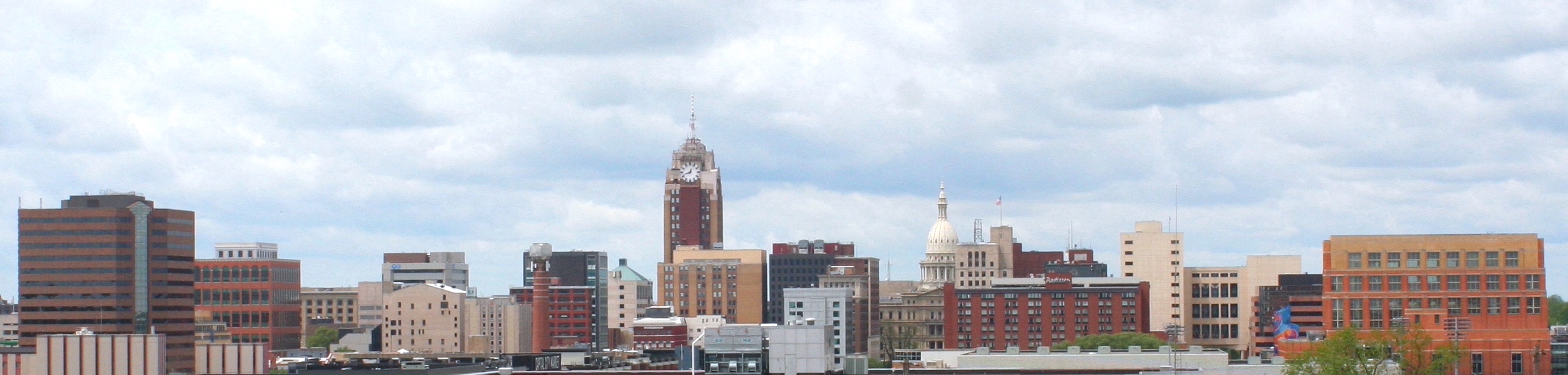
The skyline of Lansing in 2022.

Lansing is the state capital and sixth-largest city in the US state of Michigan. The city has a population of 114,781 people as of 2025. The city has 14 high-rises that stand 150 ft (46 m) tall. As of September 2026, the tallest building in Lansing is the Tower on Grand. It is still in construction but once it is finished it will stand 320 ft (98 m) tall.

== Tallest buildings ==
This list ranks buildings in Lansing that stand at least 150 ft (46 m) tall. Spires and other architectural details are included in the height of a building, however, antennas are excluded.

Tallest building in Lansing upon completion

Rank	Name	Image	Location	Height	Floor Count	Year	Use	Notes
1	Boji Tower	Boji_Tower_as_Seen_From_Washington_St.	42°43′58″N 84°33′13″W	297 ft (91 m)	23	1931	Office, Retail, Government	Tallest building in Lansing.
2	Michigan State Capitol	Michigan_State_Capitol_2024	42°44′00″N 84°33′19″W	267 ft (81 m)	4	1878	Government	Tallest building in Lansing from 1878 to 1931.
3	Grand Tower	Grand Tower Lansing Skyline 2022 (cropped)	42°43′53″N 84°33′00″W	212 ft (65 m)	16	1991	Office, Government	Designed by Hobbs & Black Associates.
4	Anderson House Office Building	Anderson_House_Office_Building,_Capitol_Avenue_and_Ottawa_Street,_Lansing,_MI	42°44′04″N 84°33′12″W	196 ft (60 m)	14	1999	Office, Government	The building contains an eight-story skybridge with a restaurant.
5	Dennis A. Swan Family Tower	Sparrow_Hospital_from_Bingham_Elementary_grounds	42°44′03″N 84°32′09″W	188 ft (57 m)	10	2008	Hospital	
6	Comerica Bank Building	City_National_Bank_Building,_Washington_Square_and_Michigan_Avenue,_Lansing,_MI_-_54383128256	42°44′02″N 84°33′09″W	182 ft (55 m)	15	1931	Office, Retail	
7	Cooley Center	Cooley_Center_in_Lansing,_MI	42°43′51″N 84°33′15″W	179 ft (55 m)	11	1968	Office, Retail, Education	
8	Accident Fund Company National Headquarters	Accident Fund Company National Headquarters Lansing Skyline 2022 (cropped)	42°44′06″N 84°32′59″W	172 ft (52 m)	9	1940	Office	Originally a steam and electric power plant before being converted into an office building in the 2010s.
9	Capitol Tower	City National Bank Building, Washington Square and Michigan Avenue, Lansing, MI - 54383128256 (cropped)	42°44′02″N 84°33′10″W	166 ft (51 m)	12	2000	Office, Government	
10	Blue Cross Blue Shield Building	Blue_Cross_Blue_Shield_Building,_Capitol_Avenue_and_Washtenaw_Street,_Lansing,_MI	42°43′53″N 84°33′15″W	166 ft (51 m)	10	1987	Office	
11	Romney Building	George_W._Romney_Building_(Hotel_Olds),_Capitol_Avenue_and_Michigan_Avenue,_Lansing,_MI_-_54383126876	42°44′00″N 84°33′11″W	165 ft (50 m)	14	1926	Office, Government	Houses the office for the governor of Michigan. Formerly the Hotel Olds.
12	Lansing City Hall	Lansing_City_Hall,_Michigan_Avenue_and_Capitol_Avenue,_Lansing,_MI_-_54383510670	42°44′02″N 84°33′12″W	159 ft (48 m)	11	1958	Government	
13	The Louie	Billie_S._Farnum_Building	42°43′56″N 84°33′12″W	159 ft (48 m)	11	1959	Office, Government	
14	Connie B. Binsfeld Office Building	Connie_B._Binsfeld_Office_Building,_Townsend_Street_and_Allegan_Street,_Lansing,_MI_-_54383521195	42°43′56″N 84°33′18″W	154 ft (47 m)	9	2005	Office, Government	Also known as the Capitol View Building. In 2017, the Michigan State Senate moved into the building.

== Timeline of tallest buildings ==
Name	Image	Years as tallest	Height	Floors	Notes
Michigan State Capitol	Michigan_State_Capitol,_Capitol_Avenue,_Lansing,_MI_-_54383361033	1878-1931	267 ft (81 m)	4	
Boji Tower	Boji_Tower_(Michigan_National_Bank_Building),_Allegan_Street_and_Capitol_Avenue,_Lansing,_MI_-_54383512160	1931-Present	297 ft (91 m)	23	

== See also ==
- List of tallest buildings in Michigan
- List of tallest buildings in Detroit
- List of tallest buildings in Grand Rapids
- List of tallest buildings in Toledo, Ohio
