= Celebration on the Grand =

Coordinates: 42.96861°N 85.67648°W

Celebration on the Grand logo

Celebration on the Grand was a free music festival held in Grand Rapids, Michigan to celebrate the quality of life in the Grand River valley and to act as an unofficial end to the summer for Grand Rapids. It included a fireworks display. The event was held annually on the weekend following Labor Day weekend. Celebration on the Grand (COTG) was organized by a board of directors, committee members and event staff who all volunteer their time.

The first Celebration on the Grand took place in 1980 as a part of the events that opened the Gerald R. Ford Presidential Museum, the Amway Grand Plaza Hotel, and the Grand Rapids Art Museum's move to the old Federal Building.

Funding was provided by corporate sponsorships, private donations and fund raising activities held by COTG volunteers during the event.

In 2015, the Celebration on the Grand organization dissolved, ending the festival after more than 30 years.
