= McKay Tower =

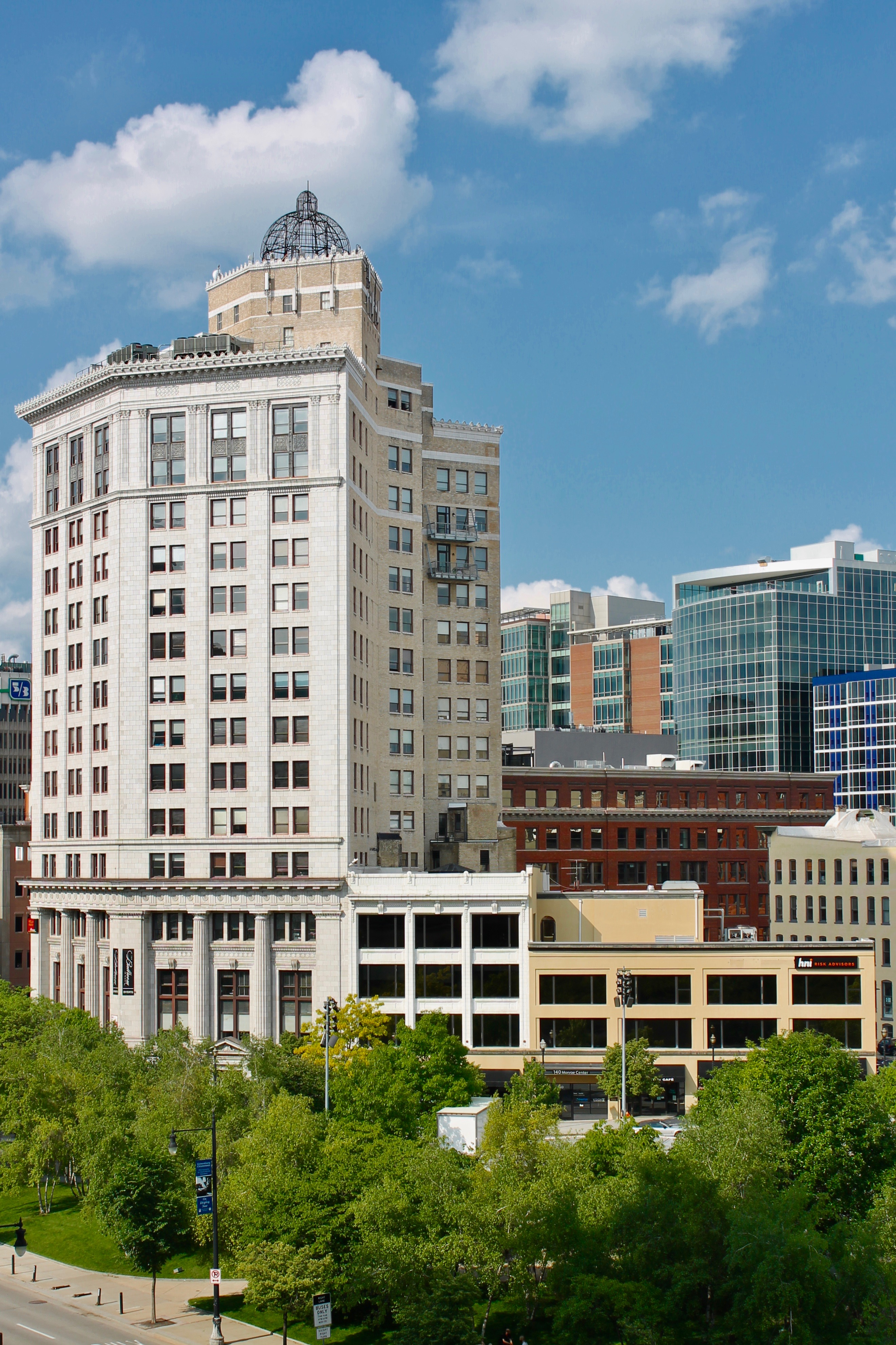
- McKay Tower in 2019.
- Interactive map of the McKay Tower area

General information
- Type: Office
- Location: 146 Monroe Center NW; Grand Rapids, Michigan; United States
- Completed: 1927

Height
- Antenna spire: 259 ft (79 m)
- Roof: 227 ft (69 m)

Technical details
- Floor count: 18
- Floor area: 146,000 sq ft (13,600 m^{2})

Design and construction
- Architect: Owen-Ames-Kimball Company

Website
- mckaytower.com

McKay Tower is a building in downtown Grand Rapids, Michigan, located on Monroe Center. The building is mixed-use for apartments, office space, retail and is a venue for events. It is currently the fifth tallest building in Grand Rapids.

== History ==
=== 19th century ===
The location of McKay Tower is where the first non-Native American marriage took place in Grand Rapids in 1834, only a few years after settlers arrived and the area was surveyed as part of the Michigan Territory. The marriage took place in a cabin that was owned by the American pioneer, Joel Guild which involved his daughter Harriet Guild and Barney Burton. The first town meeting was also held at the cabin that had a total number of nine voters.

=== 20th century ===
The Wonderly Building was then built on the location in 1890. The first two floors of McKay Tower were then built in their current manner in 1915 and the building was then known as the Grand Rapids National Bank. Another 11 floors were added between 1921 and 1927. In 1942, the tower was bought from the Grand Rapids National Bank by Grand Rapids businessman and politician, Frank D. McKay. In the early 1940s, two additional mechanical floors were added to the tower.

From the completion of the tower in 1927 to 1983, the McKay Tower was the tallest building in Grand Rapids until the completion of the Amway Grand tower. The McKay Tower was also the tallest office building in Grand Rapids until Bridgewater Place was completed in 1993.

=== 21st century ===
In 2000, the University of Michigan, which acquired the building from McKay's will, sold the tower. The building was sold to Greystone Associates later that year. Mark Roller, an internet businessman, purchased the tower in 2006 for $7.8 million, who later listed the property for sale in 2009 for $11 million.

McKay Tower was sold to Jonathan L. Borisch, founder of Borisch Manufacturing Corp. (now Amphenol Borisch) in May 2012 for $10.5 million through his Steadfast Property Holdings company. In January 2020, the Match-e-be-nash-she-wish Band of Pottawatomi Indians of Michigan and the Huron Band of the Potawatomi purchased McKay Tower for $17.5 million from Steadfast Property Holdings.

== Architecture ==
McKay Tower is a Greek Revival structure. The tower currently has a three-story penthouse and a metal dome.

== Gallery ==
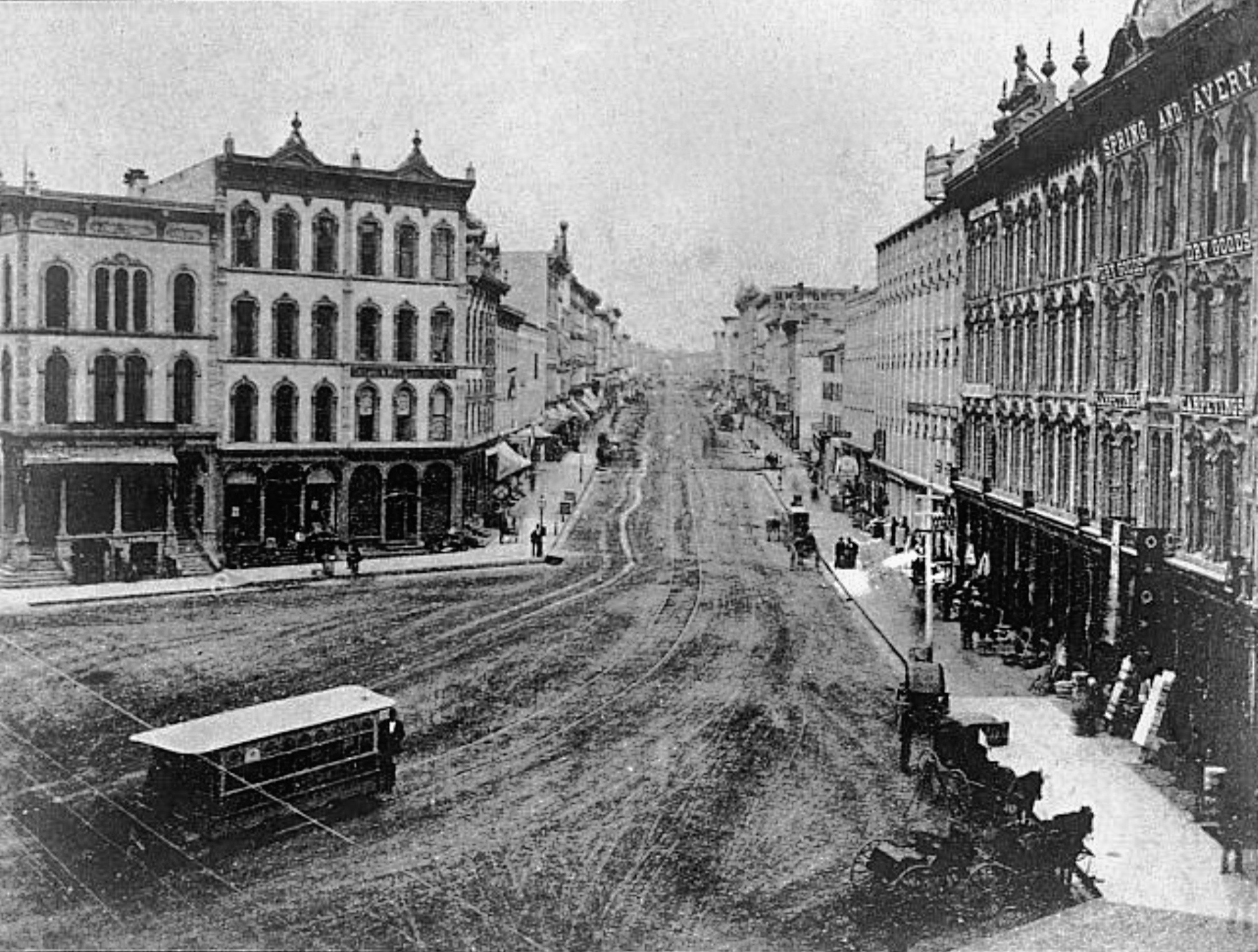
Site of McKay Tower in 1874.

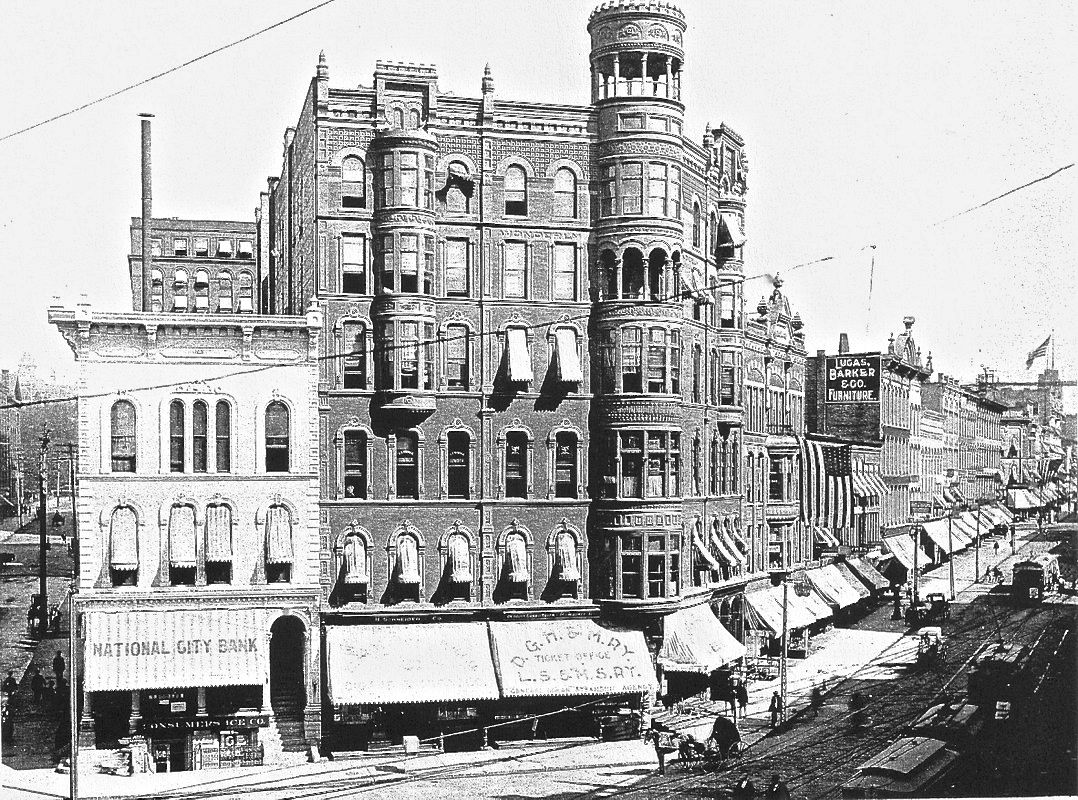
The Wonderly Building in 1912.

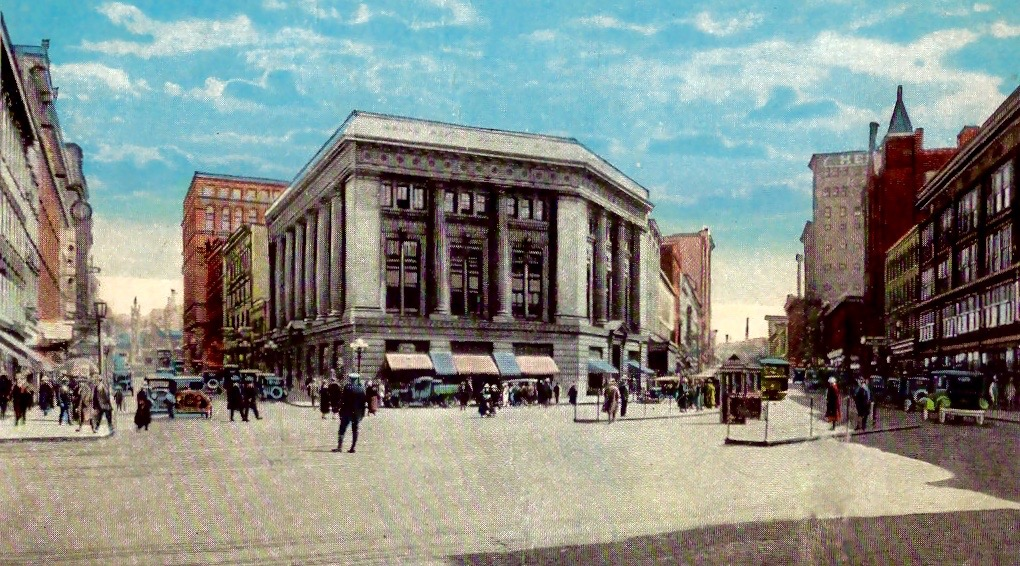
McKay Tower site circa 1915.

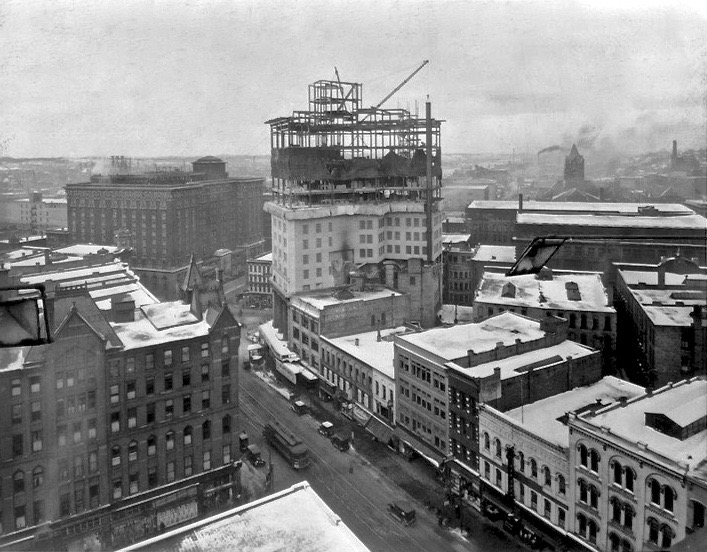
Construction of McKay Tower in the early 1920s.

== See also ==
- History of Grand Rapids, Michigan
- List of tallest buildings in Grand Rapids

Records
Preceded by St. Mary's Catholic Church	Tallest Building in Grand Rapids; 1927-1983; 259 feet (79 m)	Succeeded by Amway Grand
