= River House Condominiums =

Building

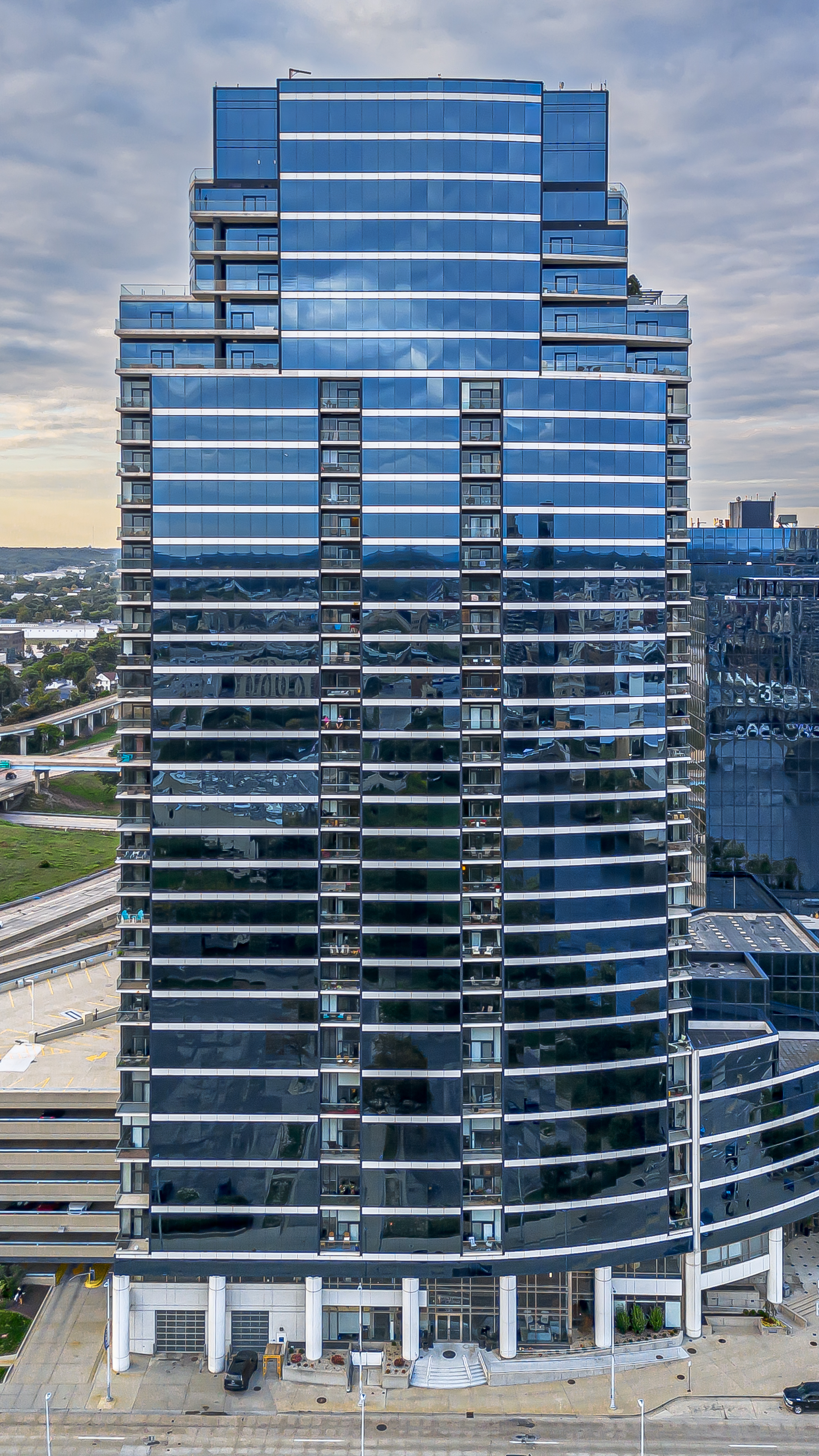

General information
- Type: Residential
- Location: 335 Bridge Street NW; Grand Rapids, Michigan; United States
- Coordinates: 42.9708°N 85.6769°W
- Completed: 2008

Height
- Roof: 406 ft (124 m)
- Top floor: 397 ft (121 m)

Technical details
- Floor count: 34
- Lifts/elevators: 3

Design and construction
- Architects: Lucien Lagrange Architects, DTS & Winkelmann Architects
- Developer: Robert Grooters Development Co.

Website
- www.grriverhouse.com

River House Condominiums is a residential skyscraper built on the west bank of the Grand River in downtown Grand Rapids, Michigan located next to Bridgewater Place. The term "Bridgewater Place" is often incorrectly used by locals and tourists alike to refer to either the complex itself or simply this building. It is the tallest building in Grand Rapids, the tallest all-residential building in Michigan, and the tallest building in the state outside of Detroit.

== Building features ==
A 7-story above ground parking garage, shared with Bridgewater Place is directly connected to the building, with the main elevators serving all 7 floors.

== Building history ==
=== Developer sales ===
The first homeowner occupancy occurred in November 2008. Nearly 140 of the initial 207 units (condos/penthouses) were under contract pre-construction, but 56 would-be condo buyers backed out of their contract following personal financial hardship and were sued by the developer. Those units were turned back to the developer following a nonbinding ruling on the contracts by Kent County Circuit Judge Donald Johnston due to a technicality in the purchase agreements drafted by Varnum law firm. Following the overturned contracts, reduced prices and sales promotions served as the catalyst to sell condos even at a loss for the developer. 90% of the units were sold by December 2011 triggering a full transfer of power from the Developer to the Homeowners Association. By the end of 2012, 198 units were sold. Due to the combining of some condos or penthouses by buyers, the total number of units was reduced from 207 to 205.

=== Community events ===
Rappelling down the front of the building was offered as a fund-raiser for Michigan Community Blood Centers prior to the completion of construction during Celebration on the Grand. A repeat event occurred June 9, 2009 but has not happened since.

Prior to their initial sale, some larger condos were used as small concert venues for a few big-name bands prior to their performances at Van Andel Arena or DeVos Place Convention Center. These events included the Bare Naked Ladies and American Idol listening parties with guest appearances by Jason Castro, Allison Iraheta, and others.

Rapper 50 Cent (Curtis Jackson) filmed a scene for his movie "The Gun" in a River House penthouse.

== See also ==
- List of tallest buildings in Grand Rapids

Records
Preceded by Plaza Towers	Tallest Building in Grand Rapids; 2008; 406 feet (124 m)	Succeeded by Incumbent
