= Plaza Towers =

Building

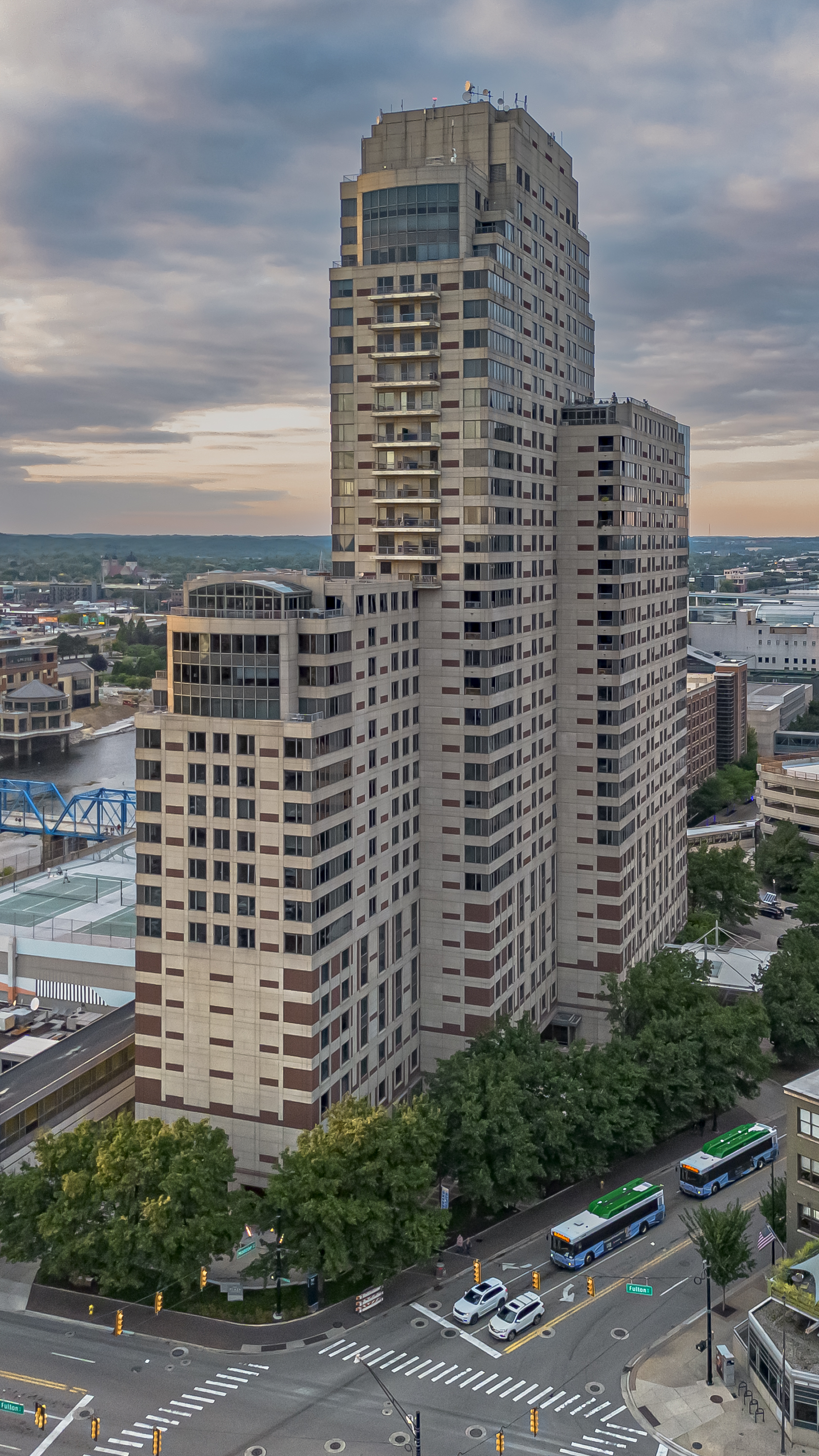
- Plaza Towers seen from above Van Andel Arena
- Former names: Eastbank Waterfront Towers

General information
- Type: mixed-use
- Location: 201 W. Fulton St. Grand Rapids, Michigan; United States
- Coordinates: 42.9641°N 85.6741°W
- Completed: 1991; 35 years ago

Height
- Roof: 345 ft (105 m)

Technical details
- Floor count: 34
- Floor area: 499,994 sq ft (46,451.0 m^{2})

Design and construction
- Architects: Griener Inc. (initial), A. Epstein and Sons (1995 renovation)
- Developer: Ed Havlik - United Development Real Estate Corp.

Website
- www.theplazagr.com

Plaza Towers is a mixed-use highrise building in Grand Rapids, Michigan. At 345 feet (105 m), it was the tallest building in the city until the completion of the River House Condominiums in 2008. The building contains apartments on floors 8–14, individually owned condominiums on floors 15–32, and a 214-room Courtyard by Marriott hotel on floors 1–7.

== Building history ==
=== Construction and early issues ===
Construction began in 1988 with $60 million financed to Havlik by Amway and a Japanese bank. The building opened in 1991 as Eastbank Waterfront Towers during a mini-boom in downtown development. However, it experienced significant structural, water leakage, and HVAC problems and had to be closed and completely re-skinned in 1995–97, just five years after opening. Vertical cracks in exterior cement panels were the cause of the water leakage, which soaked and molded interior carpets. Corroded pipes caused issues with the cooling system and air ducts distributed foul smells. The $36 million 1995 renovation was financed by Amway, who gained majority ownership. 250 residents and 160 building employees were displaced for two years during renovation work. Prior to reopening, the Radisson hotel chain left the project and the name of the building was changed to Plaza Towers. Eenhoorn LLC bought the building from Amway for $17.5 million in 2001. Amway's $31.5 million loss in the project was a “philanthropic gesture” for downtown development. Many legal battles took place over the faulty construction, excessive initial project cost, and renovation displacements.

=== Evacuations for fire ===
Small fires in the building have led to evacuations in 1996, 2001, 2002, and 2010. The 2010 evacuation was due to a 17th-floor fire causing fire and water damage, but no injuries.

=== Evacuations for flood ===
Refacing the building to correct for rain-related water leakage from exterior cracks displaced 250 residents and 160 building employees two years.

The building was again evacuated on April 20, 2013, as the flooded Grand River filled the lower level mechanical space and flooded the basement parking garage with over 7 feet of water. A waterlogged basement generator sent black smoke through the entire building and approximately 80 vehicles parked in the basement garage were flooded with up to 11 feet of water. Structural concerns for a sanitary sewer line under the building (dating back to a time when Campau Ave. extended to Fulton, where the building now stands) caused building maintenance to keep the lowest level of the building flooded until the river receded to prevent erosion under the building and around the sewer line, which prolonged the evacuation. The evacuation lasted until the building reopened on May 8, 2013.

== See also ==
- List of tallest buildings in Grand Rapids

Records
Preceded by Amway Grand Plaza Hotel	Tallest Building in Grand Rapids; 1991-2008; 345 feet (105 m)	Succeeded by River House Condominiums
