= JW Marriott Grand Rapids =

Luxury high-rise hotel

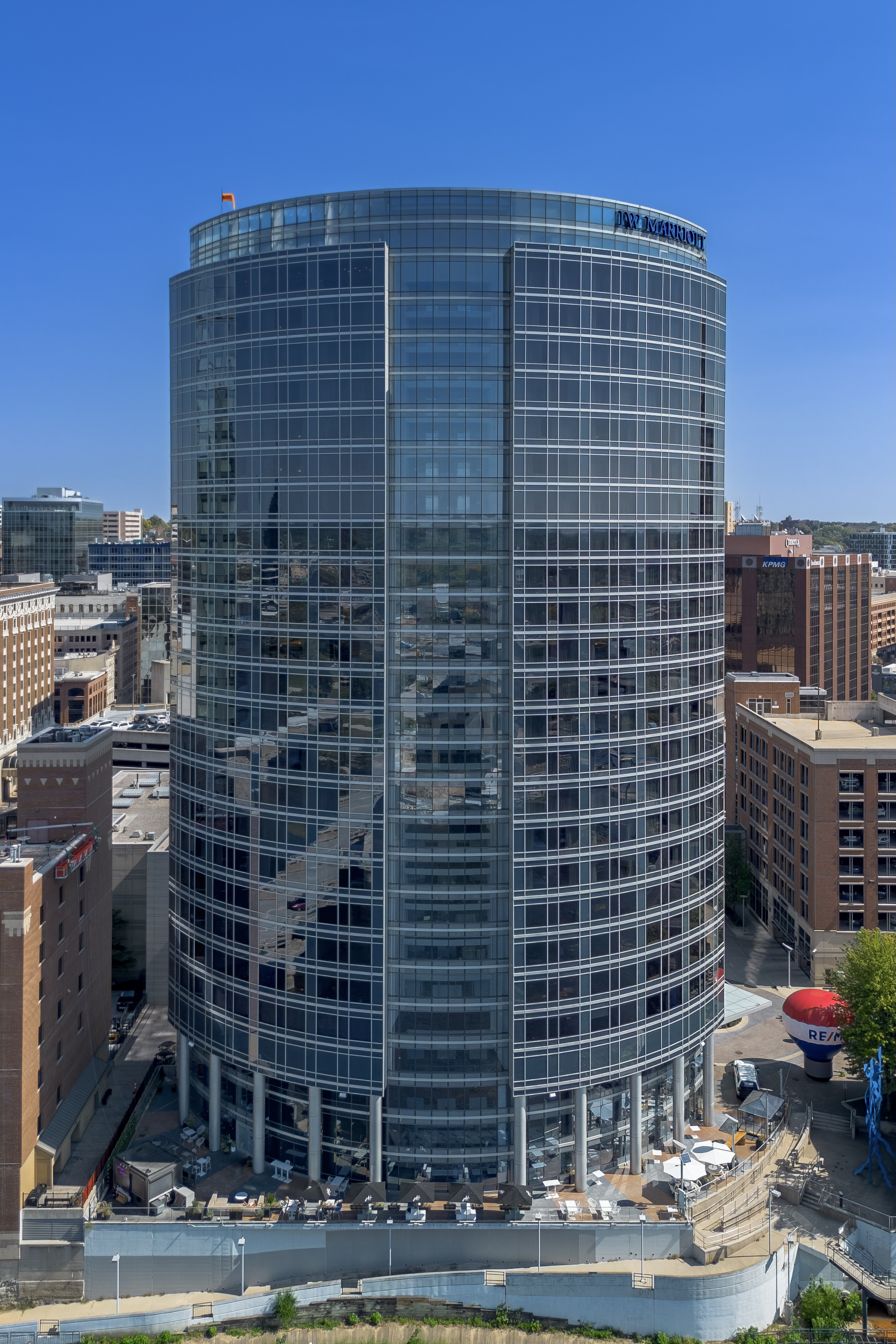
- Interactive map of the JW Marriott Grand Rapids area

General information
- Type: Hotel
- Architectural style: Modern
- Location: Grand Rapids, Michigan, 235 Louis Campau
- Coordinates: 42.96585°N 85.67435°W
- Completed: 2007
- Inaugurated: September 2007
- Owner: Amway Corporation

Height
- Height: 256 ft (78 m)

Technical details
- Floor count: 23
- Lifts/elevators: 6

Design and construction
- Awards: Marriott Opening of the Year, 2007

Other information
- Number of rooms: 337

The JW Marriott Grand Rapids is a hotel located in downtown Grand Rapids, Michigan. It was the first JW Marriott Hotel in the Midwest and is the sixth tallest building in Grand Rapids. Its theme is based on Grand Rapids's sister cities: Omihachiman, Japan; Bielsko-Biała, Poland; Perugia, Italy; Ga District, Ghana; and Zapopan, Mexico. When the hotel was first opened, Amway Hotel Corporation hired photographer Dan Watts to travel to each of the sister cities and photograph them for the property. Each floor of the hotel features photography from one of the cities and is unique to that floor.

The property was identified as the brand's best hotel for customer service in North America for 2008, 2009, and 2014.
