= Amway Grand Plaza Hotel =

Hotel in Michigan, United States

Coordinates: 42.96666°N 85.67407°W

Amway Grand Plaza
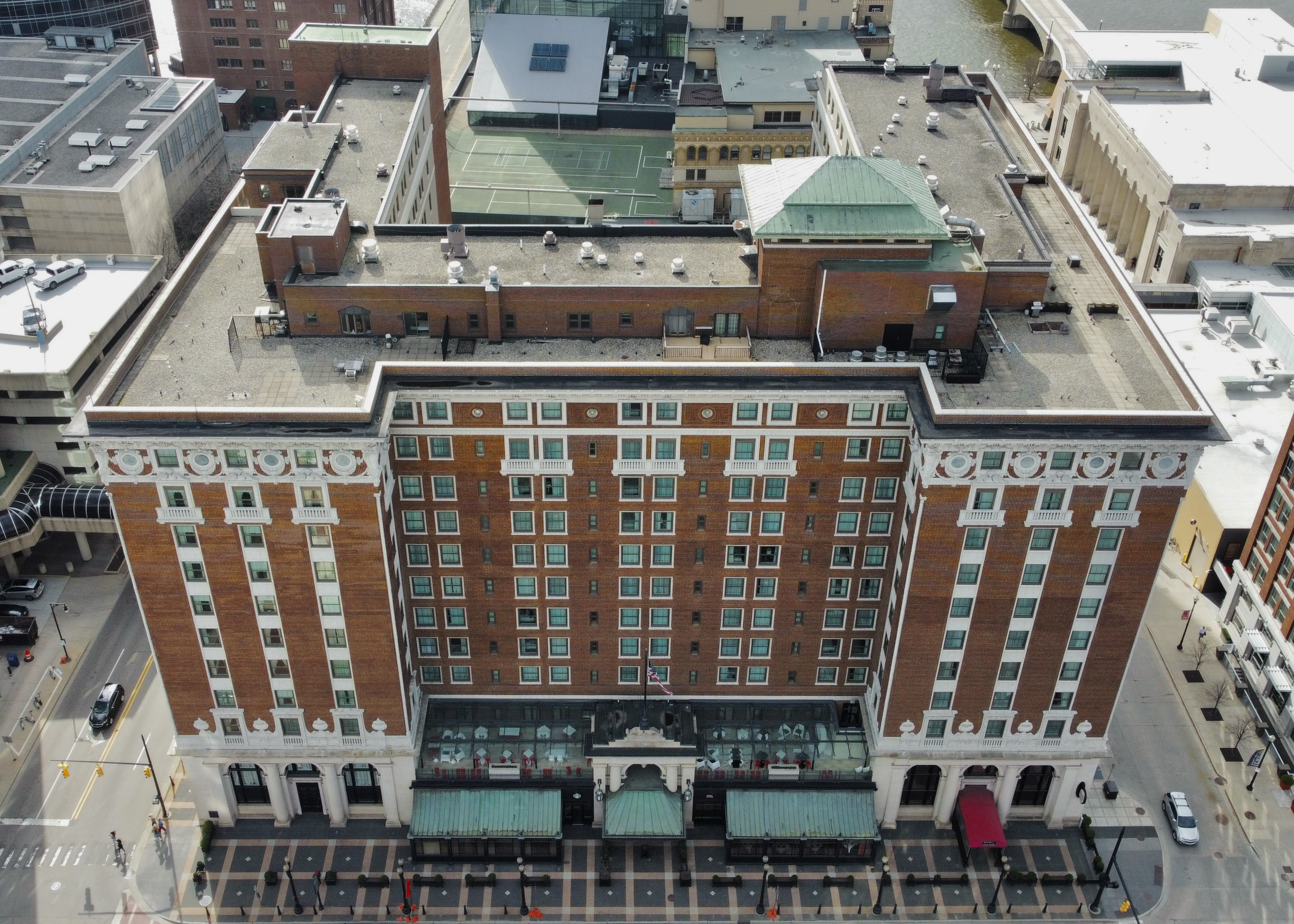
- Interactive map of the Amway Grand Plaza area
- Former names: Pantlind Hotel

General information
- Type: Hotel
- Architectural style: Beaux-Arts
- Location: Grand Rapids, Michigan, 187 Monroe Ave NW
- Completed: 1913
- Owner: AHC+Hospitality

Technical details
- Floor count: 12 Tower 29

Design and construction
- Architecture firm: Warren and Wetmore

Renovating team
- Architects: Marvin DeWinter & Associates

Website
- amwaygrand.com

Amway Grand Plaza Hotel is located in Grand Rapids, Michigan and is named after Amway Corporation, which is based in nearby Ada Township.

Originally known as The Pantlind Hotel (founded in 1913), the Amway Grand Plaza Hotel reopened in 1981 after extensive renovations done by Marvin DeWinter & Associates, including the addition of a 29-story glass tower. The Pantlind's designers Warren & Wetmore were inspired by the work of the Scottish neoclassical architect Robert Adam. During its prime years, the hotel was consistently rated as one of the top ten hotels in the US.

The hotel is owned by AHC+Hospitality, a subsidiary of Amway's holding company Alticor. Amway Grand Plaza Hotel is a member of the Curio Collection by Hilton, an affiliation that began in 2016. The hotel was also inducted into Historic Hotels of America, an official program of the National Trust for Historic Preservation, in 2012.

== History ==
=== Pantlind Hotel ===
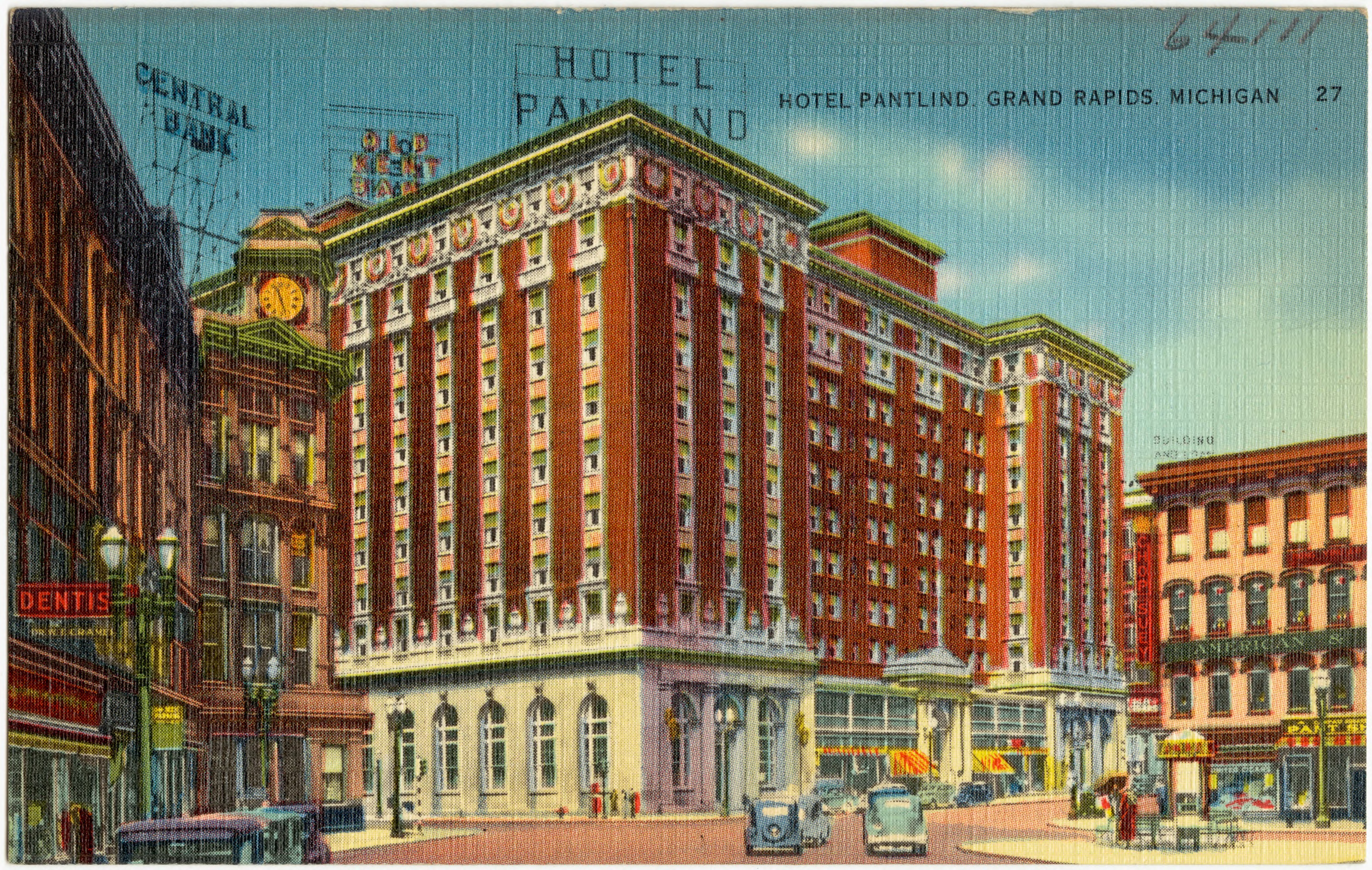
1940s postcard of the Pantlind Hotel

In the early 1900s, Grand Rapids was growing rapidly, the population reaching over 112,000 in 1910. As the city grew, iconic grand-scale buildings began to arise.

When the hotel opened in 1913, the Beaux-Arts architecture attracted many, with visitors convening in Grand Rapids choosing the Pantlind Hotel during the city's furniture shows. The Pantlind featured one of the largest gold leaf ceilings in the world, with the hotel having a Mediterranean atmosphere that was seen in its classical columns and terra cotta designs. A two-story bank was also originally located on the corner of Monroe and Pearl.

Ten years later, in 1923, a 189-room addition was made to the hotel on Lyon Street. By 1925, the Pantlind Hotel was gaining national recognition after it was named as one of America's top 10 hotels.

In 1954, Queen Juliana and Prince Bernhard of Lippe-Biesterfeld of the Netherlands stayed at the hotel, with a "royal luncheon" that included 250 people occurring at the facility.

=== Amway Grand Plaza Tower ===
Amway Grand Plaza Hotel Tower
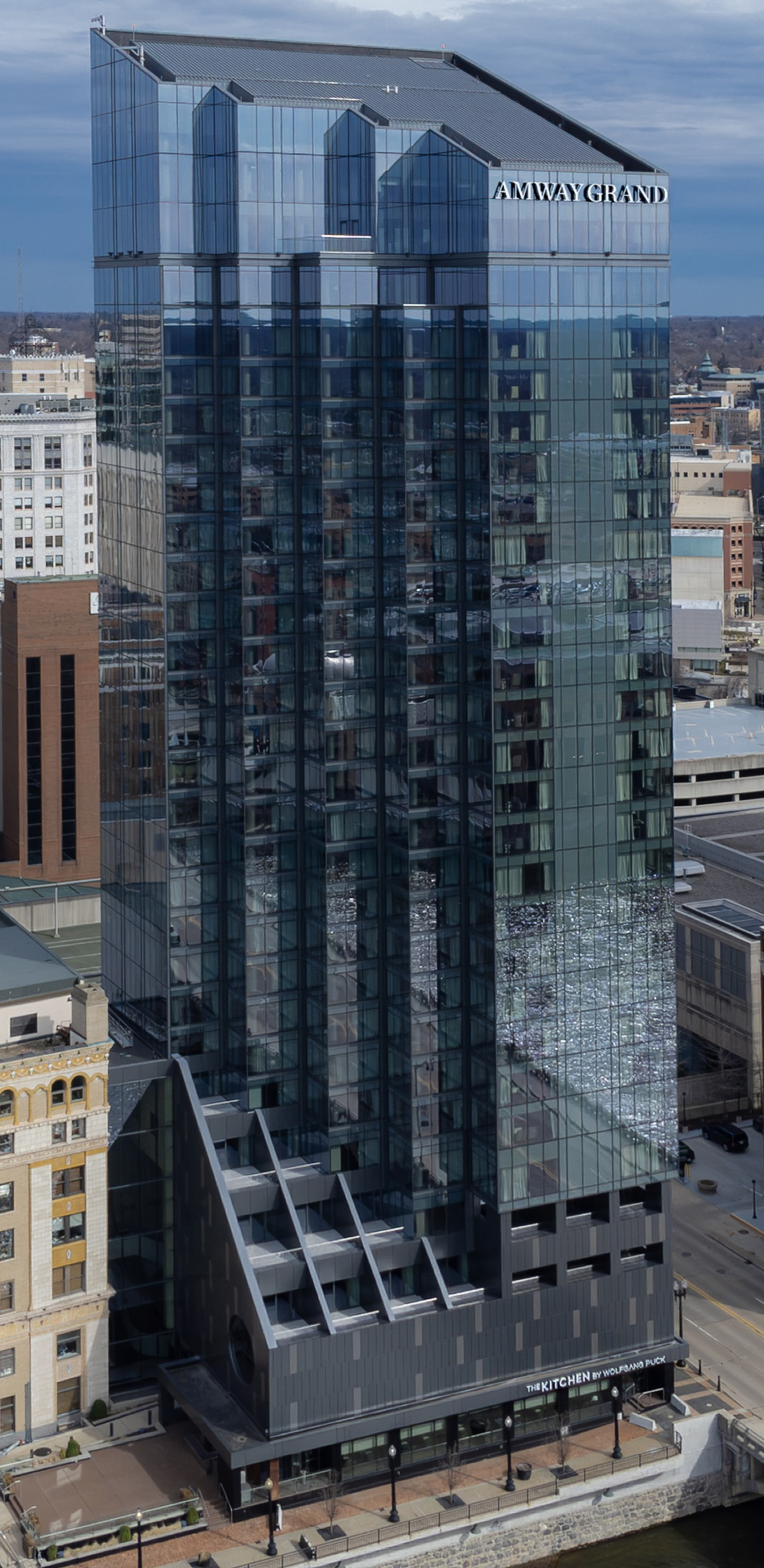
- Interactive map of the Amway Grand Plaza Hotel Tower area

General information
- Type: Hotel
- Location: Grand Rapids, Michigan, 187 Monroe Ave NW
- Completed: 1983
- Owner: Amway Corporation

Height
- Height: 318 ft (96.9 m)

Technical details
- Floor count: 29

The Amway Grand Plaza Hotel Tower, originally the Pantlind Hotel, is a 29-story, 318-foot-tall tower that opened in 1983. The tower was constructed following a renovation project of the Amway Grand Plaza Hotel initiated by Rich DeVos.

In the 1970s, the suburbs of Grand Rapids, such as Wyoming, enjoyed a great retail environment with many new developments happening along the 28th Street corridor. In 1979 after many turned towards the suburbs, the Pantlind Hotel was purchased by Amway, with Amway funding a $60 million renovation project that was described by The New York Times as being "extensive".

On September 15, 1981, the renovated Pantlind Hotel, now known as Amway Grand Plaza Hotel, opened. The reopening of the hotel was presided over by President Gerald R. Ford and his wife Betty Ford during a formal black-tie gathering. Two years later in 1983, the 29-story tower was finally completed, ending the McKay Tower's 56-year reign as the tallest building in Grand Rapids. It held the title until Plaza Towers was completed in 1991.

In 1985, two years after the tower was constructed, Jack Schnedler of the Chicago Sun-Times stated:

Amway Grand Plaza: Here's a world-class hotel plunked in the middle of Michigan, occupying the opulently restored shell of the old Pantlind Hotel and a sleek 29-story adjoining wing. Service during my April stay was small-town cheerful, the room was richly furnished, and dinner in the top-of-the-line Cygnus restaurant stood up to New York or San Francisco standards.

Other guests who have stayed at the hotel include political figures and officials such as British Prime Minister Margaret Thatcher, Queen Noor of Jordan and General Norman Schwarzkopf Jr. as well as celebrities such as James Earl Jones, Cher, Joe Montana, Faye Dunaway, and Jerry Seinfeld In 2011, Grand Rapids mayor George Heartwell credited the development of the Amway Grand Hotel with reshaping downtown Grand Rapids.

In 2014, the tower underwent a $14 million renovation that included updating electrical outlets and network connections, as well as giving the room and bathroom designs a more modern look. It was the sixth renovation to rooms in the tower since 1983.

The 1913 Room, which closed in 2011, was the only restaurant in Michigan to be awarded five diamonds by the American Automobile Association. Starting in 2011, the hotel started an effort to rebrand first with replacing the 1913 Room restaurant with a Ruth's Chris Steak House. In May 2015, Cygnus 27 restaurant had changed its menu to a Latin one. The Cornucopia and Bentham's restaurants were redone as Wolfgang Puck restaurants opening the fall of 2015. Prior to 2016, the Amway Grand Plaza Hotel was affiliated with the Preferred Hotels & Resorts reservation system. In 2016, the hotel became a part of the Curio Collection by Hilton reservation system.

Amway stated in August 2018 that renovations to the tower would begin in January 2019 and would be scheduled to finish in April 2021. Changes include modernizing the function and appearance by making windows lighter colored which will span from floor to ceiling. The height of the tower will also increase slightly as a result of new construction.

Records
| Preceded by McKay Tower | Tallest building in Grand Rapids; 1983–1991; 318 feet (97 m) | Succeeded by Plaza Towers |

=== Grand River Promenade ===
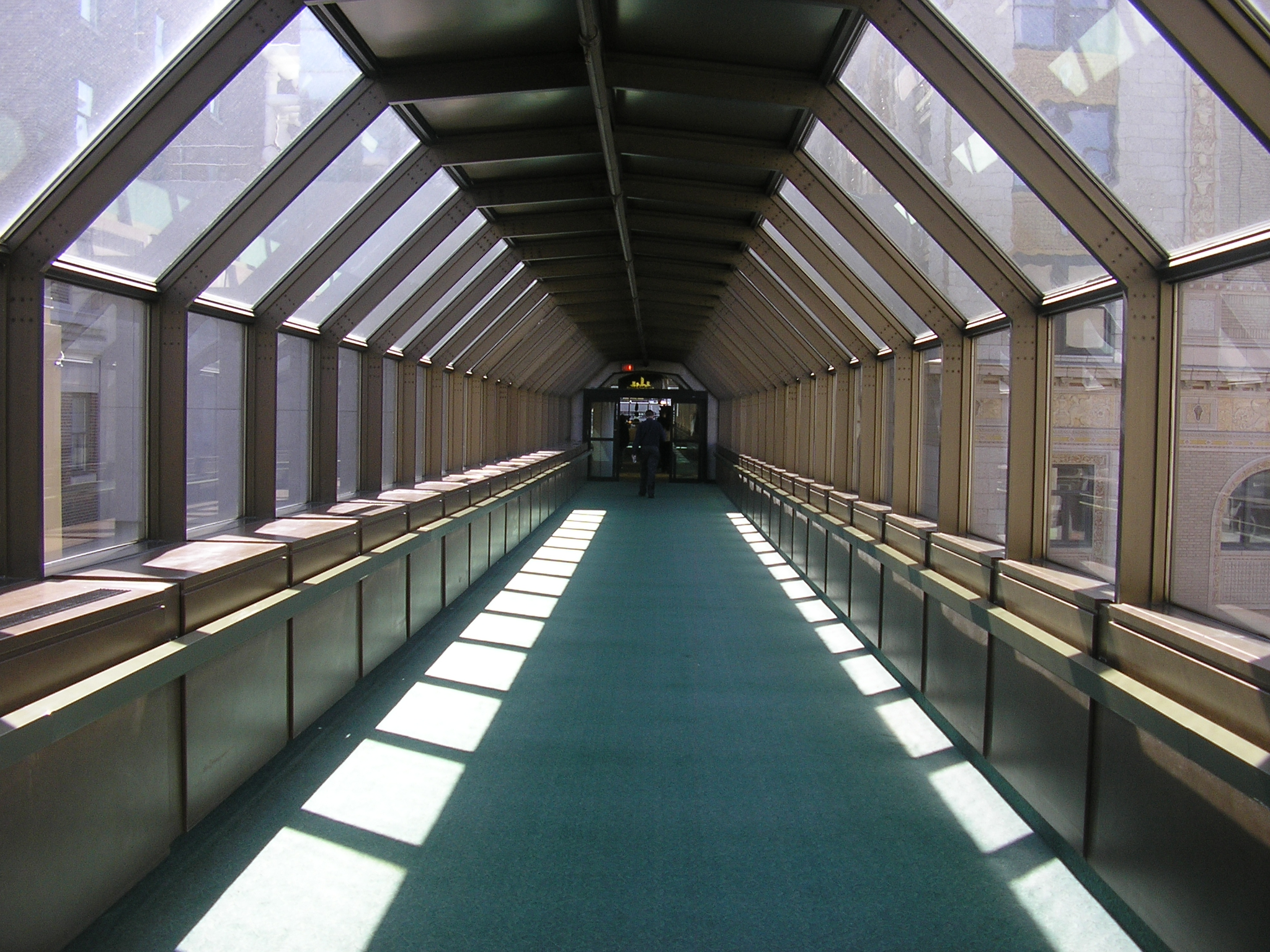
Skyway to Amway

The Grand River Promenade, the official name for the skyway, is on the hotel's second floor as well as the hotel's parking ramp.

== Gallery ==
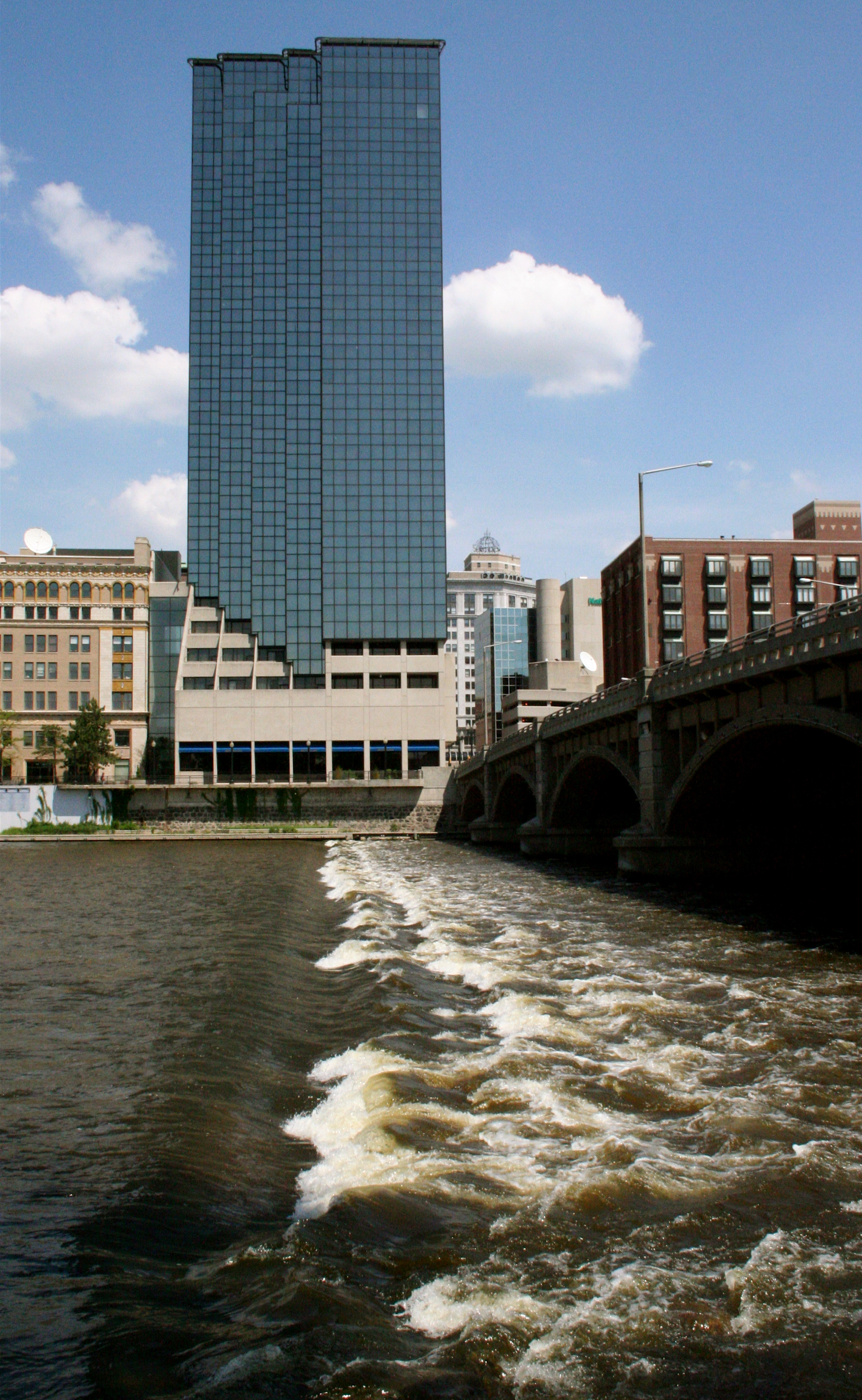
Amway Grand Plaza Towers Building

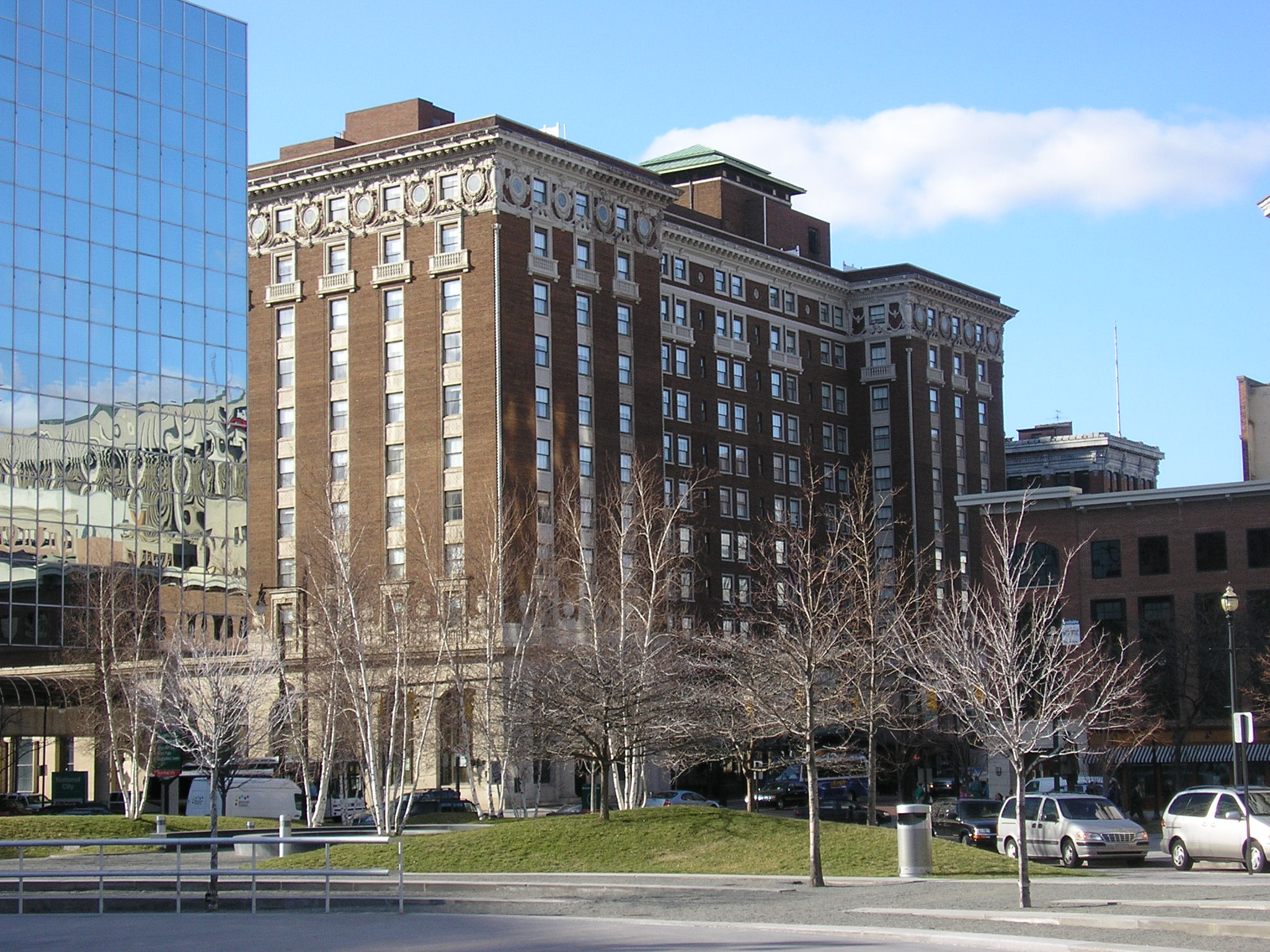
Amway Grand Plaza Hotel: This picture shows the original Pantlind Hotel from the vantage point of Rosa Parks Circle.

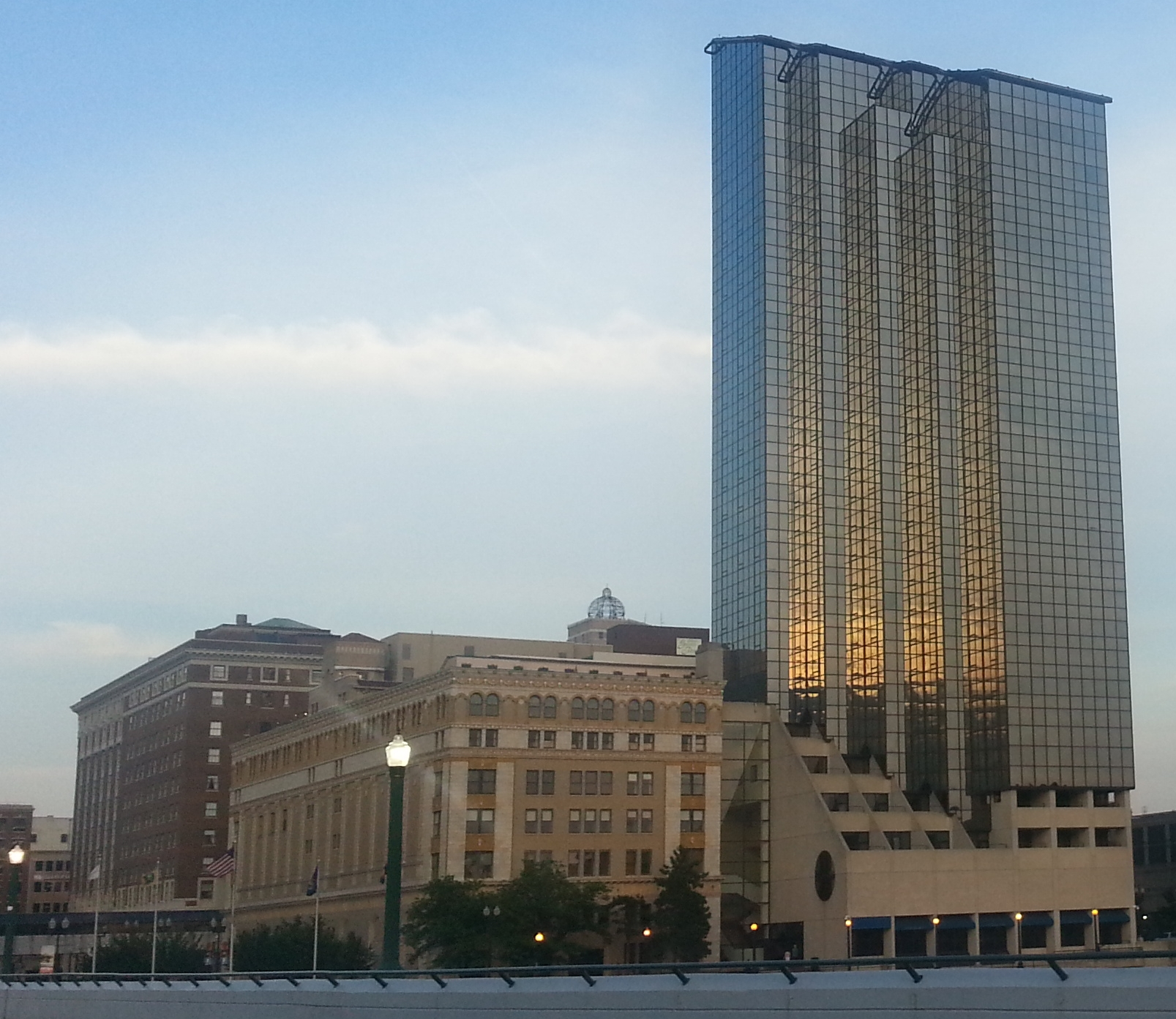
View of all the buildings of the Amway Grand Plaza Hotel from the Grand River

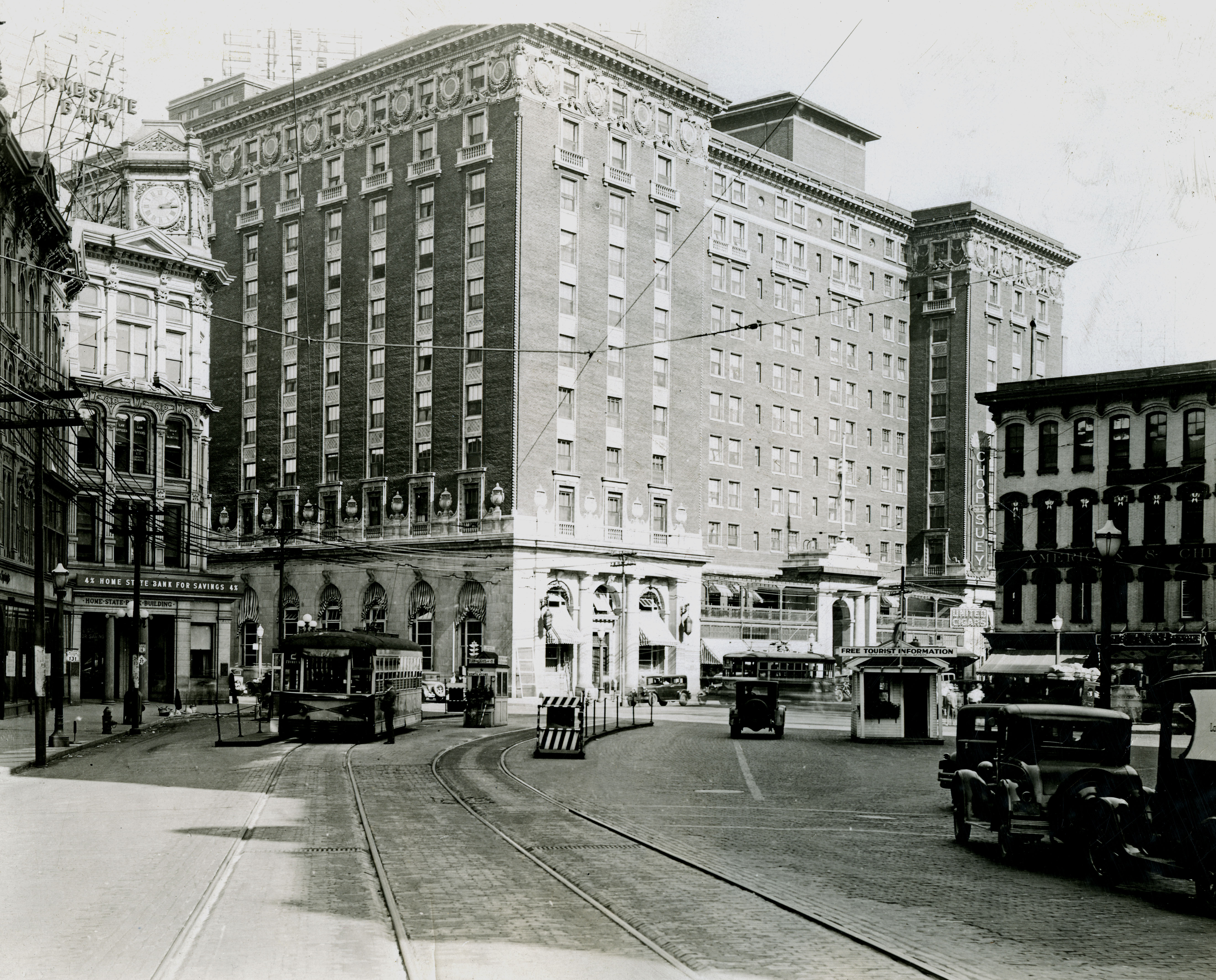
The Pantlind Hotel in 1930

== See also ==
- List of tallest buildings in Grand Rapids
