= Bridgewater Place, Grand Rapids =

Bridgewater Place
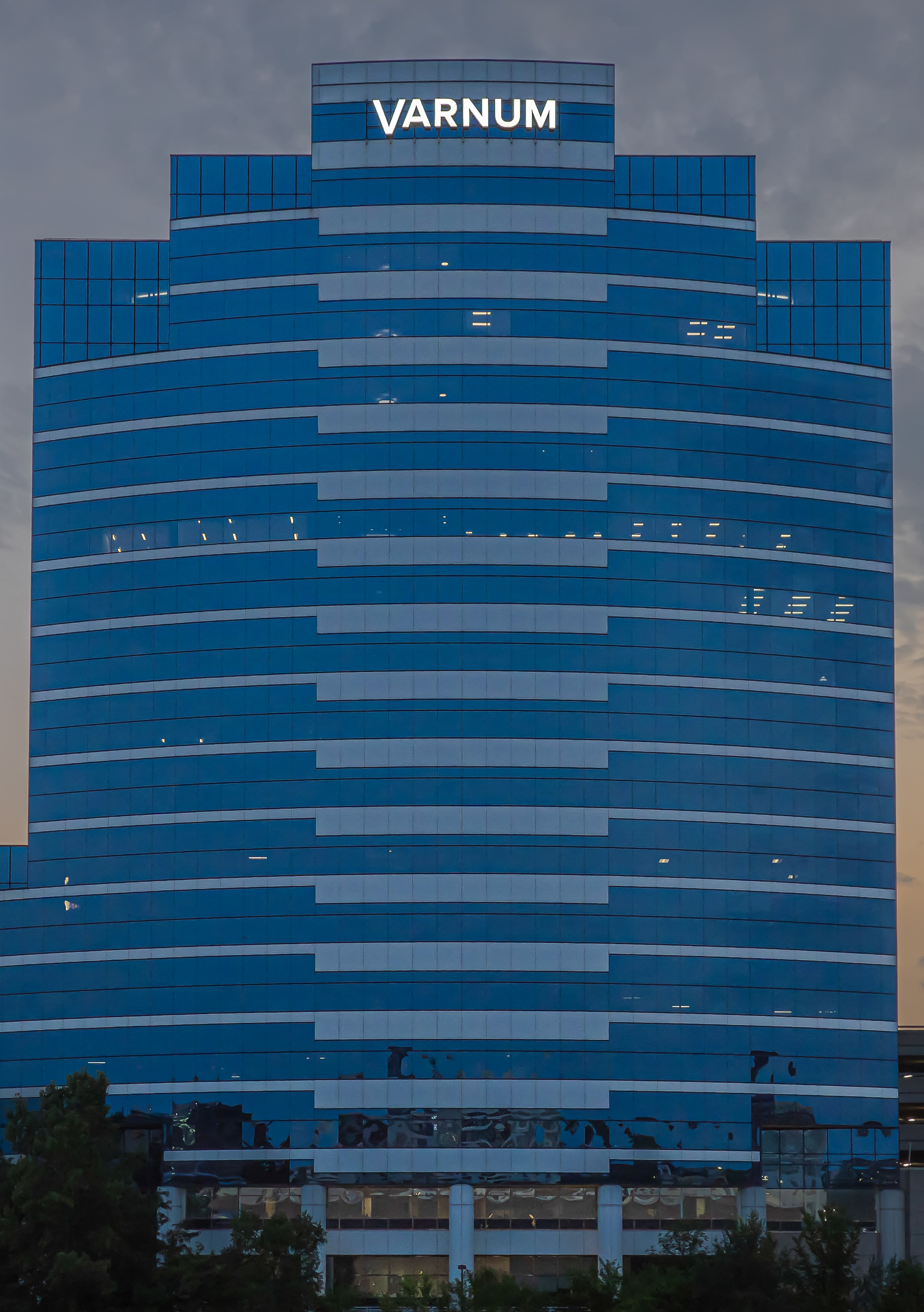
- Interactive map of the Bridgewater Place area

General information
- Type: commercial
- Location: 333 Bridge Street NW; Grand Rapids, Michigan; United States
- Coordinates: 42.9713°N 85.6762°W
- Completed: 1993

Height
- Roof: 272 ft (83 m)

Technical details
- Floor count: 18
- Lifts/elevators: 8 (5 passenger, 1 service, 2 parking)

Design and construction
- Architect: Winkelmann Architects

Bridgewater Place is the first phase of a two-building construction in Downtown Grand Rapids, Michigan. It is currently the fourth tallest building in the city. The second phase was River House Condominiums, which is the tallest building in Grand Rapids. Bridgewater Place is a class A office building with its own parking garage. The building has 2 lobby floors with some minor offices, 15 office floors, and a small mechanical floor at the top totaling 18 floors. The two buildings share a 7-story above-ground parking garage.

== See also ==
- List of tallest buildings in Grand Rapids
