= 1300 Lafayette East Cooperative =

Skyscraper in Detroit

Coordinates: 42.336552°N 83.034609°W

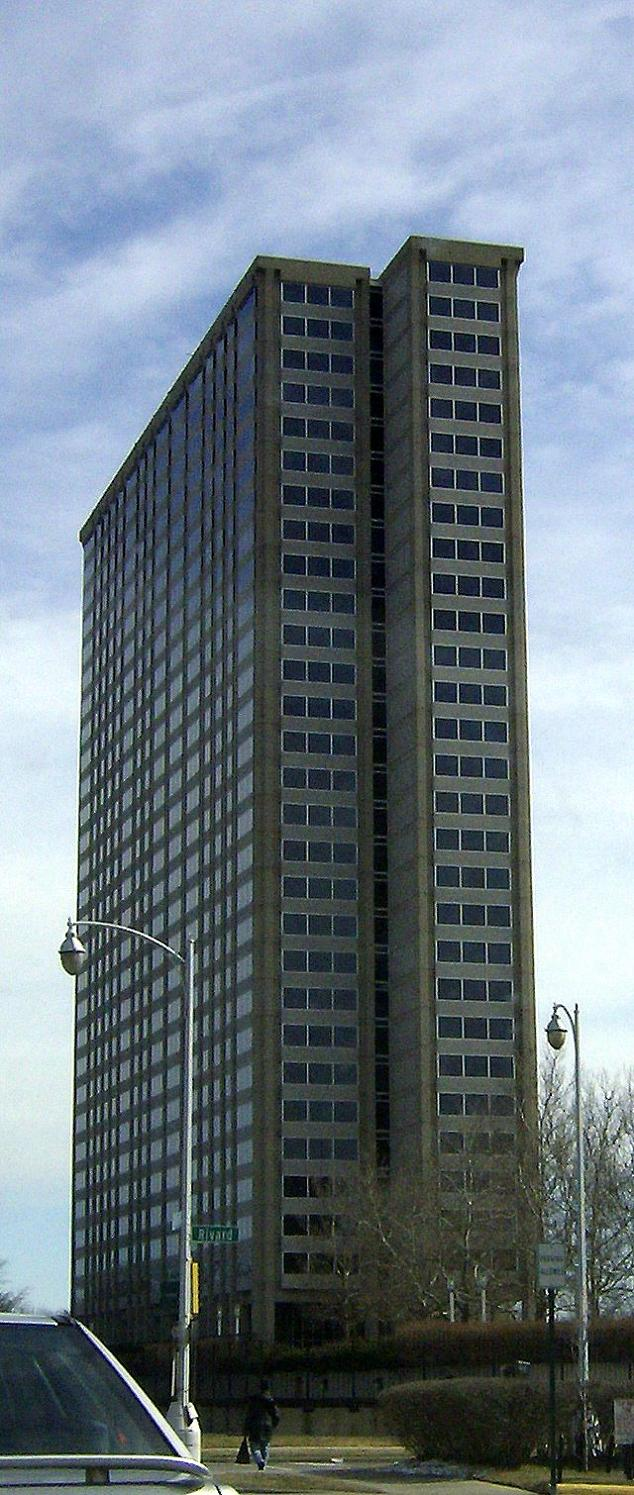
- Interactive map of the 1300 Lafayette East Cooperative area

General information
- Type: Residential
- Location: Detroit, Michigan; United States
- Completed: 1964

Technical details
- Floor count: 30

Design and construction
- Architects: Gunnar Birkerts, Birkerts & Straub

The 1300 Lafayette East Cooperative is a large, 336 unit luxury housing cooperative in the Lafayette Park neighborhood of the near-east side of Detroit, Michigan. The building is notable for its address "1300" displayed in giant numerals on the North and South sides of the roof which are visible for miles in Detroit and Windsor.

== History ==
Constructed in 1961 and completed in 1964, 1300 Lafayette East stands at 30 floors. The building incorporates a ground floor with 2 story marble lobby, meeting rooms, conference room, and offices. A mezzanine houses a fitness center and commercial offices, and above it rise 28 residential floors. The building is constructed atop a two-floor underground parking garage. Apartments in the building have unobstructed views of the surrounding cityscape, downtown, the Detroit River and Windsor, Ontario. Designed by Gunnar Birkerts, the building incorporates a number of innovative and elegant construction and modern architectural design elements in its reinforced concrete construction.

Thirteen Hundred was originally designed as the first phase of a two building complex, with the second phase twin apartment building facing Larned Street at the corner of Rivard, immediately south of Lafayette Boulevard. However, market conditions existing at the time of completion resulted in the cancellation of the second project. Eventually this site was developed as the Carlton Apartments.

Thirteen Hundred has always had an impeccable reputation which has attracted a number of notable residents, among them the singer Diana Ross. The building's owners fell on hard times in the 1970s due to a declining city population and a mixture of extremely spacious studio to four bedroom apartments, which were not favorable in the rental market at the time. After a mortgage default by the owner, the building briefly became the property of the U.S. in an unusual manner - without the involvement of the Department of Housing and Urban Development, who had insured the mortgage. In 1979 the building was subsequently converted to co-op ownership - on the initiative of the tenants, who organized to avoid a sale to commercial interests or to the City of Detroit.

== Zoned schools ==
The community is zoned to Detroit Public Schools. Residents are zoned to Chrysler Elementary School, Duffield K-8 for middle school, and Martin Luther King High School.

== See also ==
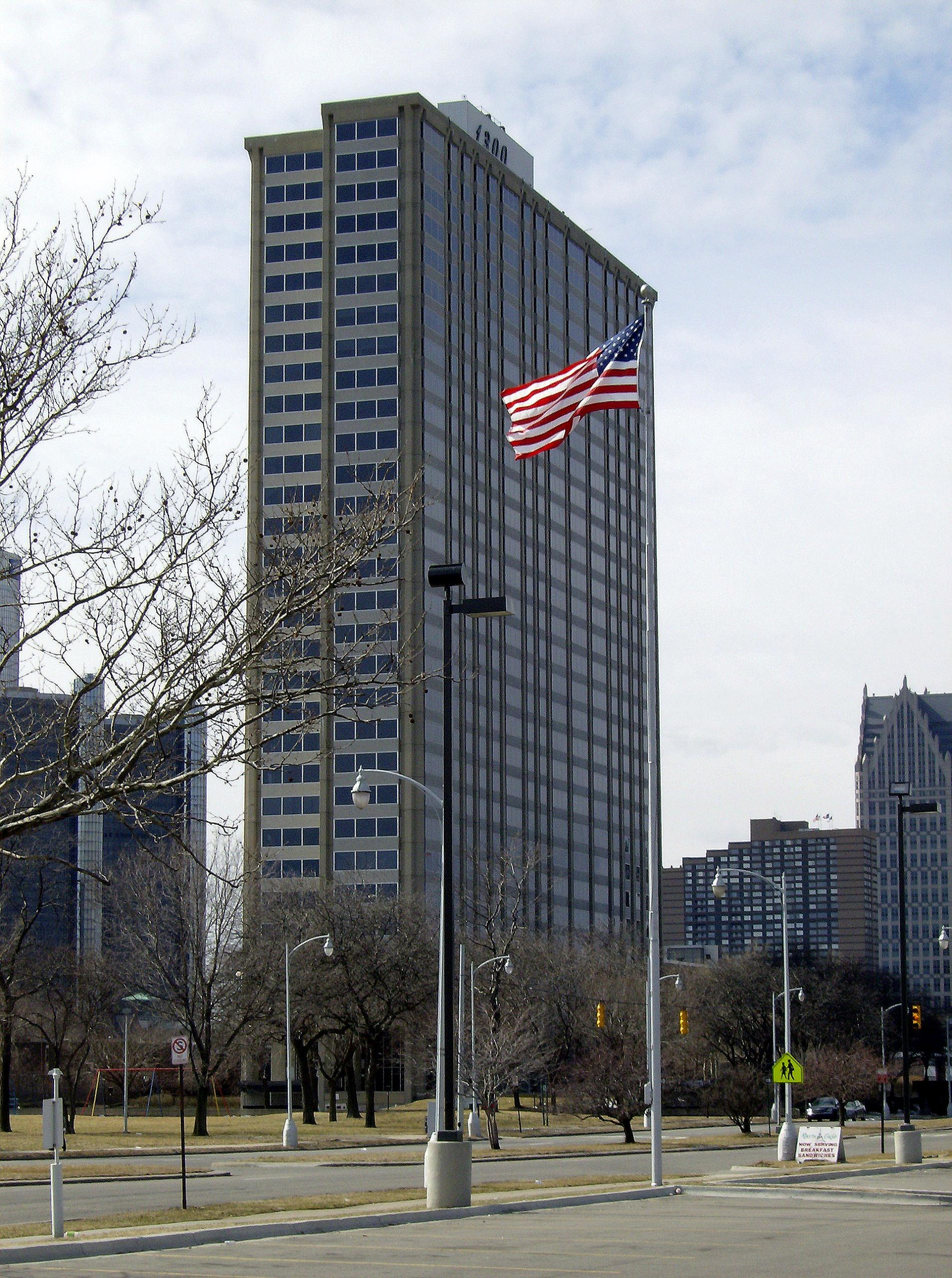
View from shopping plaza across the street.

- Robert Sharoff
- Gunnar Birkerts
- Lafayette Park, Detroit
- Lafayette Towers Apartments West
- Lafayette Towers Apartments East
- Lafayette Pavilion Apartments
