= University Tower =

University Tower may refer to:

- University Tower (Durham, North Carolina), a 17-story skyscraper
- University Tower (Mexico City), a 58-story skyscraper
- University Towers, a residential apartment building in Ann Arbor, Michigan
- Plaza Hotel, College Station, also known as University Tower, a former hotel building in College Station, Texas
