= Lafayette Park, Detroit =

Neighborhood of Detroit, Michigan

Lafayette Park
- Neighborhood of Detroit
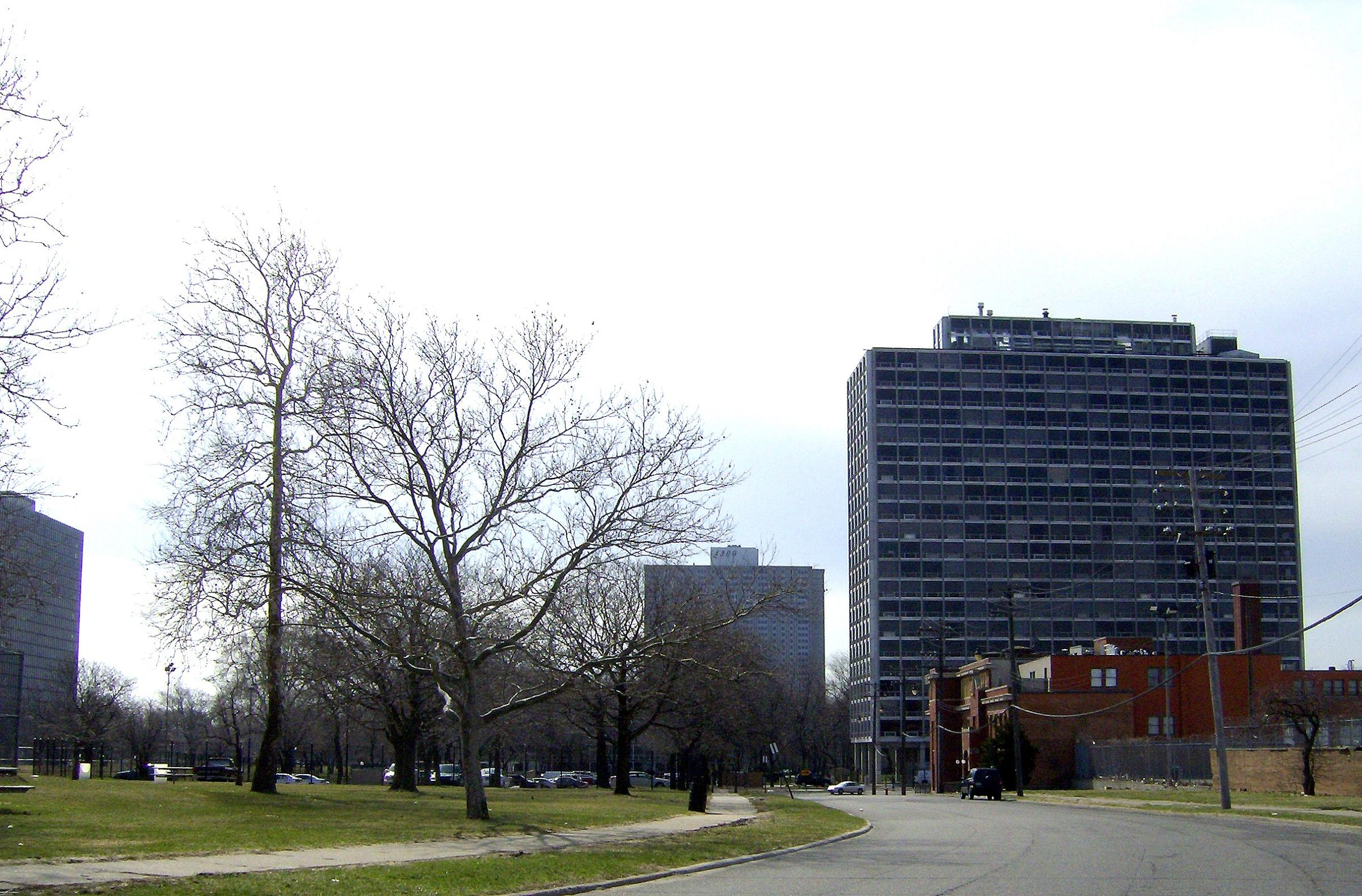
- Lafayette Towers in Lafayette Park

- Location within the city of Detroit Lafayette Park (Michigan)
- Coordinates: 42°20′22″N 83°01′55″W
- Country: United States
- State: Michigan
- County: Wayne County
- City: Detroit

Lafayette Park is a neighborhood located east of Downtown Detroit. It contains a residential area of some 4,900 people and covers 0.37 sq mi.

The northern section, planned and partially built in the 1950s by Ludwig Mies van der Rohe, is listed in the National Register of Historic Places; it was designated a National Historic Landmark District in 2015. Lafayette Park is located on the city's lower east side directly south of the Eastern Market Historic District.

== Buildings and developments ==
Lafayette Park is principally composed of two superblocks, which combine low- and high-density housing, in the manner favored by the Federal Housing Administration after World War II.

The first phase, formerly known as the Gratiot Redevelopment, was bounded by Hastings Street (later the Chrysler Freeway and, ultimately, the I-375), Gratiot Avenue, Orleans Street, and Lafayette Street. The developments in this section include:

- The Pavilion Apartments (Mies van der Rohe, 1959)
- Mies Van der Rohe Townhouses (Mies, 1959)
- Walter Chrysler Elementary School (Gould, Moss and Joseph, 1963)
- Lafayette Towers West and Lafayette Towers East (Mies, 1963)
- Towers Shopping Center (King and Lewis, 1963)
- Four Freedoms House (John Hans Graham, 1965)
- Cherboneau Place North and South (1962–1965)
- Chateaufort Cooperative (1965–1967)
- Regency Square Apartments (Joseph Savin, 1965)

The second phase, formerly known as the Lafayette Extension, is to the south, bounded by The I-375, Lafayette, Orleans Street, and Jefferson Avenue. The original developments in this portion include:

- 1300 Lafayette East (Gunnar Birkerts, 1964)
- Central Park Plaza Apartments (Originally known as Central Park Plaza, Giffels and Rossetti, 1963)
- Rochdale Court Apartments (1964–1967, demolished 2002)
- Navarre Place Townhouses (Hausner and Macsai, 1965 and 1969)
- Jean Rivard Apartments (Pastor-Fonsville, 1967)

In 1963, considerable confusion was eliminated when the two phases, along with prior contained (and overlapping) developments variously called the Gratiot-Orleans Development Area, Lafayette Plaisance, and Lafayette Park-University City, were consolidated by the Lafayette Park Development Association, under the name of "Lafayette Park."

A greenway runs through the center of the entire development, beginning at Gratiot and continuing to the two blocks to the South, and is known as Lafayette Plaisance (between Gratiot and Lafayette), Lafayette Central Park (between Lafayette and Larned), and Lafayette Entry Park (between Larned and Jefferson). From 1960 onward, both of the superblocks became known as simply Lafayette Park. The conventional city block between Larned and Jefferson also contained two of the indigenous buildings that survived the clearcutting (the University Club and the Somerset Apartments) and several pre-renewal commercial buildings and one church line Gratiot to the north.

The development also borders on the Dequindre Cut Greenway, a rail-to-trail redevelopment following below Orleans Street.

Although Lafayette Park is most commonly identified with van der Rohe, Gunnar Birkerts and John Macsai played significant roles in the south half of the neighborhood.

== Urban renewal ==
- Mies van der Rohe Residential District, Lafayette Park
- U.S. National Register of Historic Places
- U.S. National Historic Landmark District
- Area: 46 acres (19 ha)
- Built: 1956
- Architect: Ludwig Mies van der Rohe, Ludwig Hilberseimer, et al.
- Architectural style: International style
- NRHP reference No.: 96000809

Significant dates
- Added to NRHP: August 1, 1996
- Designated NHLD: July 21, 2015

Several factors came together to create the urban renewal zone that later became Lafayette Park. Firstly, FHA policies following World War II promoted aggressive "slum clearance," under the Housing Act of 1949, providing up to half of demolition costs on projects that often impacted African-American neighborhoods. Secondly, Detroit had been completely built out and lacked land that could be developed, which limited property tax revenue. thirdly, Walter Reuther, of the United Auto Workers, had made the development of mixed-income housing a priority.

== Demise of Black Bottom ==
The selection of this site operated to the detriment of Detroit's Black Bottom, the center of Detroit's African-American population, which featured a vibrant commercial district on Hastings Avenue. The zone, long named for its rich black topsoil, had previously been inhabited by various immigrant groups over the ages. In addition to the practice of targeting African-American neighborhoods for urban renewal, the neighborhood was also deemed suitable for redevelopment because it had a very high proportion of renters and very low property tax revenue.

Beginning in 1948, the Citizens Redevelopment Corporation was formed and began to acquire and demolish property in the Gratiot Redevelopment. Many of the original residents were relocated to the north and west. By the end of the final acquisitions, in 1967, 78 acres had been cleared.

The success of the project in increasing tax revenue was such that the city engaged a similar program in Corktown, leveling much of a neighborhood of frame houses in favor of industrial property. The process also repeated in the areas now inhabited by Blue Cross and Blue Shield, DTE Energy and the MGM Casino, Wayne State University, and the Detroit Medical Center, all of which were urban renewal zones.

== Evolving design ==
=== Yamasaki/Gruen/Stonorov plan ===
Following World War II, the FHA favored mixed site plans including both high-rises and garden-style apartments or townhouses. That was a feature of redevelopment projects in many cities, including San Francisco, with its Gateway Center. In general, garden apartments, which had been constructed since the 1930s, have superblocks, generally with off-street entrances, are generally a maximum of two stories tall, repeat with identical buildings throughout a development, feature minimal ornamentation, and use landscaping to increase visual interest.

Initially, Minoru Yamasaki, Victor Gruen, and Oscar Stonorov were commissioned to create a site plan and design the residential buildings. Their initial design, in the Gratiot Redevelopment (the north half) involved 20 high-rise towers, some of square proportion and some rectangular, along with several dozen townhouses. The latter were notable for being clustered in a checkerboard pattern, with four two-story buildings surrounding a central courtyard.

Ultimately, the project could not find funding as mixed-income housing, and the original plan was not realized.

=== Mies, Hilberseimer, and Caldwell ===
In 1956, when the project had been an open field for several years, Herbert Greenwald, a young Chicago developer, proposed to take on the project as a middle-income development. He conditioned his participation on using Ludwig Mies van der Rohe as the principal architect. At the time, Mies was an architecture professor at and the principal designer of buildings for the Illinois Institute of Technology. Mies had taken on sporadic projects outside of academic life, such as the Seagram Building in Manhattan and 860–880 Lake Shore Drive in Chicago. Mies brought in Ludwig Hilberseimer and Alfred Caldwell, two of his associates at IIT, to serve respectively as site planner and landscape architect. Joseph Fujikawa, who had received a master's degree studying under Mies and ultimately would become the successor to Mies' practice, was the chief designer for all of Mies' residential projects.

As reflected by promotional photos, the original site plan for the Gratiot Redevelopment featured five 22-story slab-shaped high-rises and four 22-story smaller and more square ones, as follows:

- West of Lafayette Plaisance, a slab in the northwest corner (north of Lafayette) and a similar slab-shaped building offset by a square tower at the corner of Lafayette and Rivard.
- East of Lafayette Plaisance, three equally spaced slabs. The south one was on Larned, the central one was midway up the length of the east parcel, and the northern one was offset with a square tower in a mirror image of the one at Lafayette and Rivard. The east section included a square shopping center with access from Orleans.
- Numerous townhouses were concealed by tree cover.

The plan was repeatedly changed throughout Mies' involvement. The first phase of the project proceeded substantially according to the final plan, with the construction of the Pavilion Apartment, originally conceived as part of a predecessor development that included the Wayne State School of Pharmacy. The Pavilion is a 22-story structure that resembles 860-880 Lakeshore in its use of 21-foot column bays with two nine-foot-wide windows. Heating and cooling is via hassock-like heat exchange units near the windows. The lobby, set inward from the perimeter, featured two stories and three elevators. An identical structure would be used in Lafayette Towers, below, though with a larger number of narrower windows on the same bays. Because American fire codes required the steel columns to be encased in concrete, the exposed "frame" of all three buildings is actually an ornamental I-beam.

The team proceeded to construct the Mies townhomes, which ultimately would be 186 units in four designs: there were a small number of two, three, and four-bedroom ranch-style townhomes with courtyards, with the balance being three-bedroom, two-story townhouses. The low-rise housing was set several feet above grade to minimize views of automobiles and generally featured central parking lots serving multiple buildings, but the courtyard homes had driveways that led to the front door. The general construction of the low-rise houses was a lightweight steel space frame from which 3-inch concrete slabs were hung for floors and glass panels for front and rear walls. The units are separated by fire brick walls and topped with flat roofs. The ends are capped by a grey-beige slip-coated brick common to the era. Two-story units are essentially glass on both ends, bisected on the first floor by a mechanical core, containing the kitchen.

The townhouses would be operated as apartments until 1961–1962, when they were converted into four co-operatives. Two vacant units had served as the first school for the neighborhood, with Chrysler Elementary being built shortly thereafter.

== Post-Greenwald developments ==
=== Lafayette Towers ===
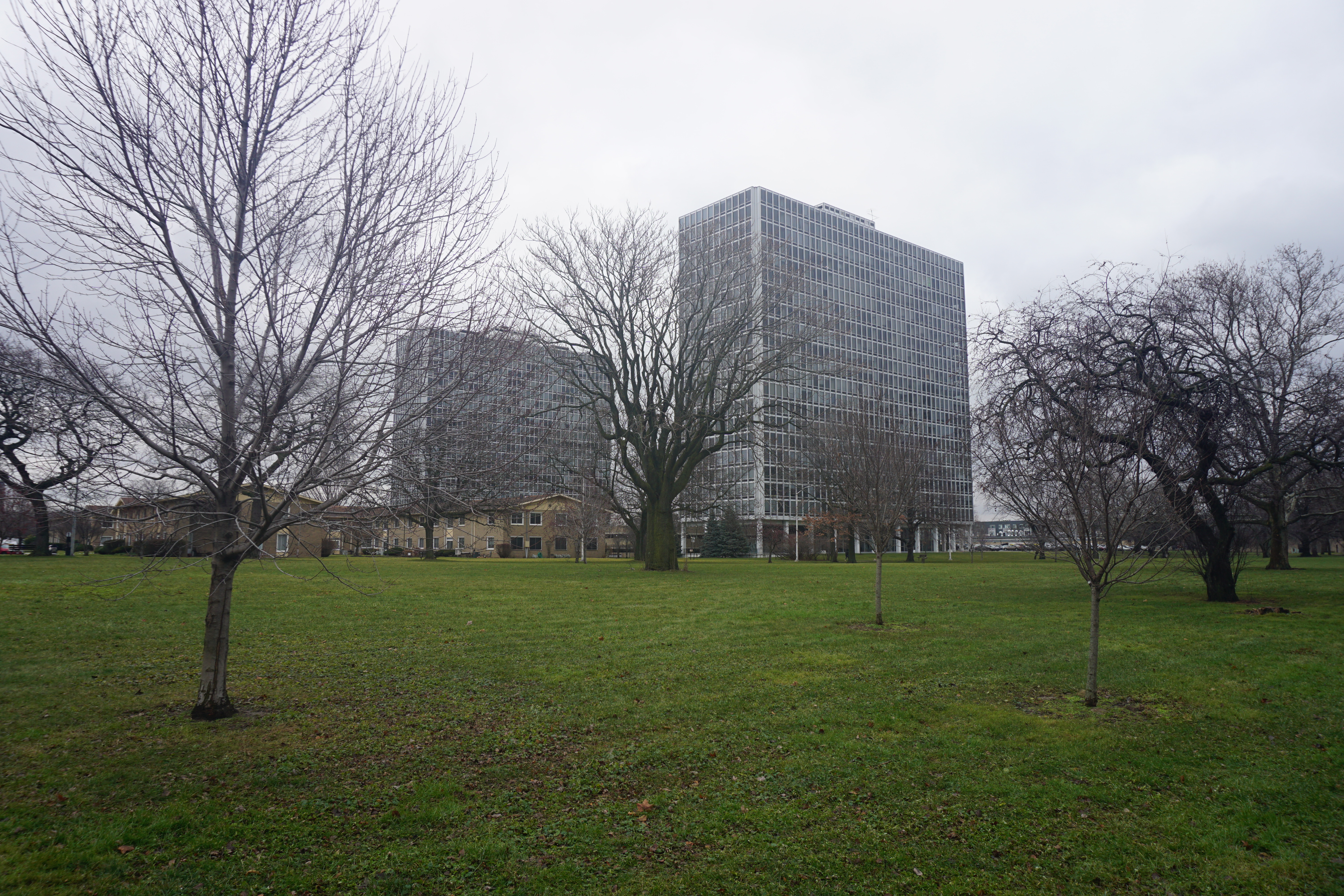
Lafayette Towers, with Lafayette Park in the foreground

In 1959, Greenwald was killed when his plane crashed on approach to New York's LaGuardia Airport. Greenwald had been planning and executing residential projects all over the United States and was on his way to shop a site in Lower Manhattan. His death dealt a significant blow to all developments he sponsored, and it resulted in the firing of half of Mies's staff.

The recession of 1958 had already resulted in a 20% unemployment rate in Detroit, and it was left to the Habitat Companies, headed by Daniel Levin, to finish the project. The final Mies-designed project was Lafayette Towers (1961–1964), two towers perpendicular to the original site plan that were connected by a central garage, and serviced by a central mechanical plant. The whole project would later be replicated in Newark, New Jersey, as the Pavilion Apartments. As Fujikawa recounted, the Lafayette Towers "model proved to be a practical and economical solution, and Mies saw no reason to change it." The Towers differed from the Pavilion in three principal ways: the window panels were half the size, the lower portion of the window was replaced by a ventilator unit, and the penthouse was made with a metal, not glass, facade.

=== Shopping centre ===
Because HUD had mandated for new developments to include a shopping center, Greenwald's partners built the present-day shopping center (originally called "Towers Plaza"), which originally featured a two-story concrete bank building with windows that called back to the Lafayette Tower Penthouse and an L-shaped pedestrian mall. The bank building was demolished in 2002, despite historic district designation, and in the mid-2000s, the shopping center's appearance was changed to make it look more like the Mies townhouses. At all stages in its existence, the shopping center was a significant departure from Mies's original design, which featured a hat-shaped shopping center with parking adjoining Orleans and now the Dequindre Cut.

In 1963, the same year the Towers were completed, Mies suffered a bout of arthritis, which progressively worsened until his death and required him to moderate his work.

=== Cherboneau, Chateaufort, and Regency Court ===
Roughly contemporaneously with Lafayette Towers, four additional parcels in the Gratiot Redevelopment were developed:

1. Cherboneau North and South were developed by a teachers' union. Chernoneau South is a complex of conventional garden-style homes. Cherboneau North featured garden-style homes with glass-enclosed walkup stairways between corridors.
2. Chateaufort is a complex of 60 one-storey townhomes arranged around a U-shaped street. Some of the houses are away from and perpendicular to it. The design is a more conventional form of the Mies courtyard house, on a somewhat larger scale. Each has three bedrooms, two bathrooms, and a basement.
3. Regency Court, now Parc Lafayette, designed by Joseph Savin, was initially regaled as one of the most progressive designs in Lafayette Park, with three-story buildings clustered around a garage decked with a swimming pool. The larger units are two-story units accessible by an underground road and parking structure. Both stories have outward-facing windows, and the top story faces out over the pool. Above those are third-floor walkups. There is an eight-story tower in the complex, off Orleans.

== Lafayette Extension ==
=== 1300 Lafayette East ===
In 1960, Morton Scholnick, who had developed Ann Arbor's Huron Towers, engaged Gunnar Birkerts, a Latvian-born modern architect, and Frank Straub to design an ultra-luxury apartment building on a site originally projected for a Mies highrise. The original Birkerts site plan included two 30-story towers and several hundred townhouses, connected by a series of underground roads. 1300 Lafayette East, the first part of the development, was the tallest concrete building in Detroit and featured two slabs, offset along a central corridor, giving the illusion of thinness. The structural columns are both irregular and asymmetrical on the north and the south sides and follow the room boundaries of the bedrooms in units (1-3 bedrooms) and studio apartments. Unlike the Mies structures, 1300 Lafayette East was designed in the New Formal style of modern architecture and so features a subtle gable detail and places the building on a podium, which contains a two-story underground garage, on top of which are trees and a garden space. Consistent with Birkerts's design philosophy, no cars are visible from the street.

=== Navarre Place project ===
Shortly after the completion of 1300 Lafayette East, Scholnick engaged John Macsai to design Navarre Place. A simplified version of the original Birkerts development, Navarre Place features both projections and recesses from a basic oblong shape: the rear doors, accessible from the street, are inset, and the dining rooms are set out. Remarkably, they were called single-family homes, not co-operatives or condominiums. The design reflects the philosophy of Macsai, who as a Jewish refugee from the Nazis in Hungary, came to believe that privacy was a prime concern in multi-family housing. That brought him into direct conflict with Mies, who disagreed with his philosophy.

The civil disturbances of 1967 caused Downtown Detroit development to collapse and arrested the construction of Navarre Place after the north side of the first street had been built. Construction would resume in 1968, and the south side would be built in 1969. Today, a stub road reflects the unrealized additional parallel streets, and the twin tower to 1300 Lafayette East, to be sited at Larned and Rivard, was never started.

=== Other original developments ===
Rochdale Court, on a site bounded by Lafayette, Orleans, Ducharme, and Lafayette Central Park, was a senior living development consisting of one-story apartments clustered around central courtyards. It was demolished in 2002 and was developed in 2015-2016 as DuCharme Place, a Bauhaus-inspired complex of four 3 1/2-story apartment buildings.

The Central Park Plaza Apartments, to the south of the Rochdale Court site, were designed as A-frame walk-ups of one-and two bedrooms, with several buildings clustered around a swimming pool.

The Jean Rivard apartments is a series of three-story apartment buildings set between Larned, Lafayette, the I-375, and Rivard. They are primarily one-story apartments, with some two-story loft units under canted roofs.

== Subsequent additions ==
Some years after the original developments were completed, three new developments were constructed on the Lafayette Extension. They are not generally recognized as being part of Lafayette Park but are in its footprint:

- Carlton Apartments (1971)
- Palms East Apartments (1974)
- DuCharme Place (2016)

== Popular culture ==
1300 Lafayette East was the most famous part of the development in the late 1960s and early 1970s. Its super-luxury positioning resulted in living there becoming a badge of "the good life," with judges, criminals, and local celebrities living there simultaneously. It was the setting for a pivotal scene in Elmore Leonard's City Primeval, and in 2014, Jewish Ensemble Theater produced an eponymous play.

The Pavilion Apartments were the setting for the apartment of Angelo Perino, played by Tommy Lee Jones, in The Betsy, a 1978 adaptation of a Harold Robbins novel about a fictitious family automotive empire.

== Skyline ==
There are 186 one and two-story cooperative townhouses on 18 acres west of the park, built between 1958 and 1960. The complex also includes:

Building Name	Architect	Floors	Year Completed
1300 Lafayette East Cooperative	Birkerts	30	1964
Lafayette Pavilion Apartments	Mies	22	1958
Lafayette Towers Apartments East	Mies	22	1963
Lafayette Towers Apartments West	Mies	22	1963
The Windsor Tower (Four Freedoms House)	Graham	21	1965

== Education ==
The community is zoned to Detroit Public Schools.

Residents are zoned to Chrysler Elementary School, Created for the children of Lafayette Park and the finest grade school in the DPS system. Bunche K–8 for middle school, and Martin Luther King High School. Previously Duffield K–8 served the community for middle school.

Detroit Public Library operates the Elmwood Park Branch Library at 550 Chene. The branch first opened on April 21, 1975, in the Elmwood Park Plaza. The first owners of the shopping plaza included the branch after residents insisted on the inclusion of the library. As of 2009 it is the only branch located in a shopping plaza.

== Gallery ==
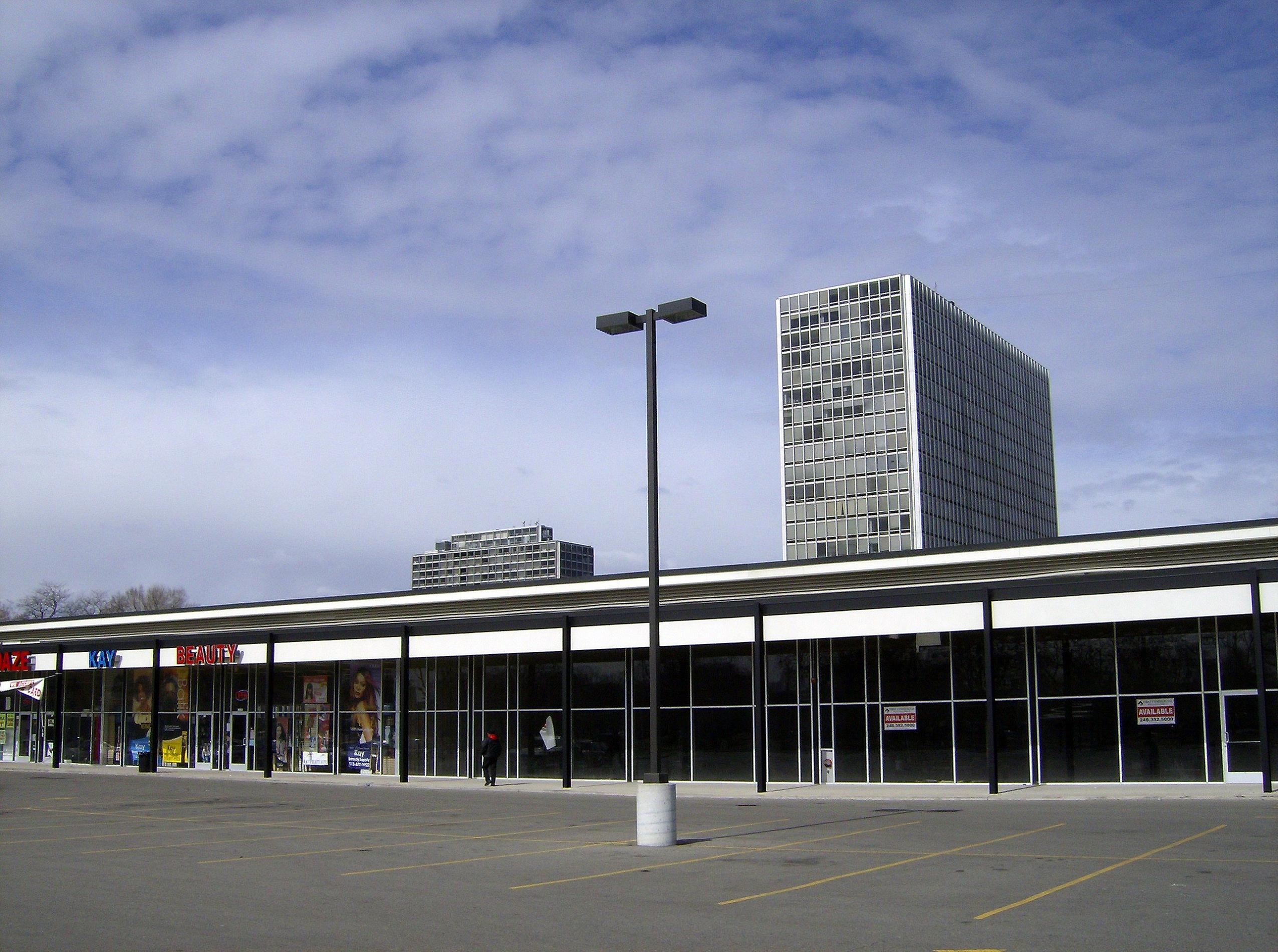
Lafayette Park Detroit includes shopping

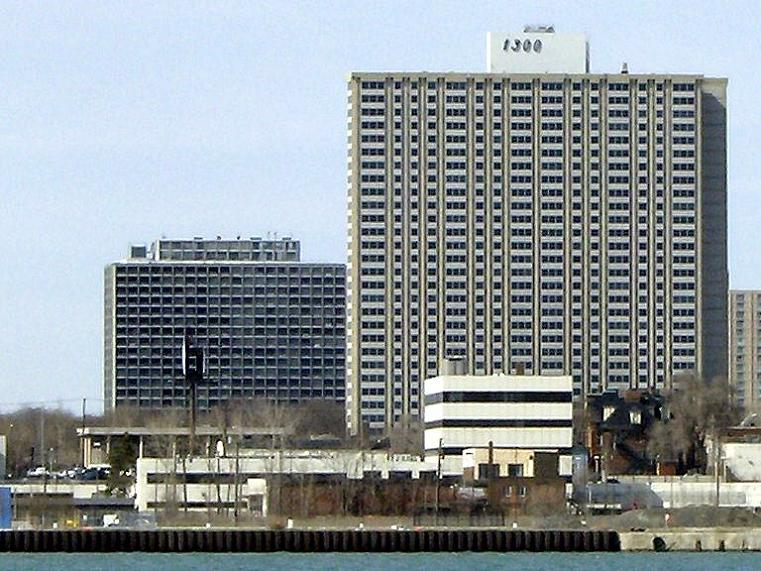
1300 Lafayette East Cooperative in the foreground, Lafayette Pavilion Apartments in the background

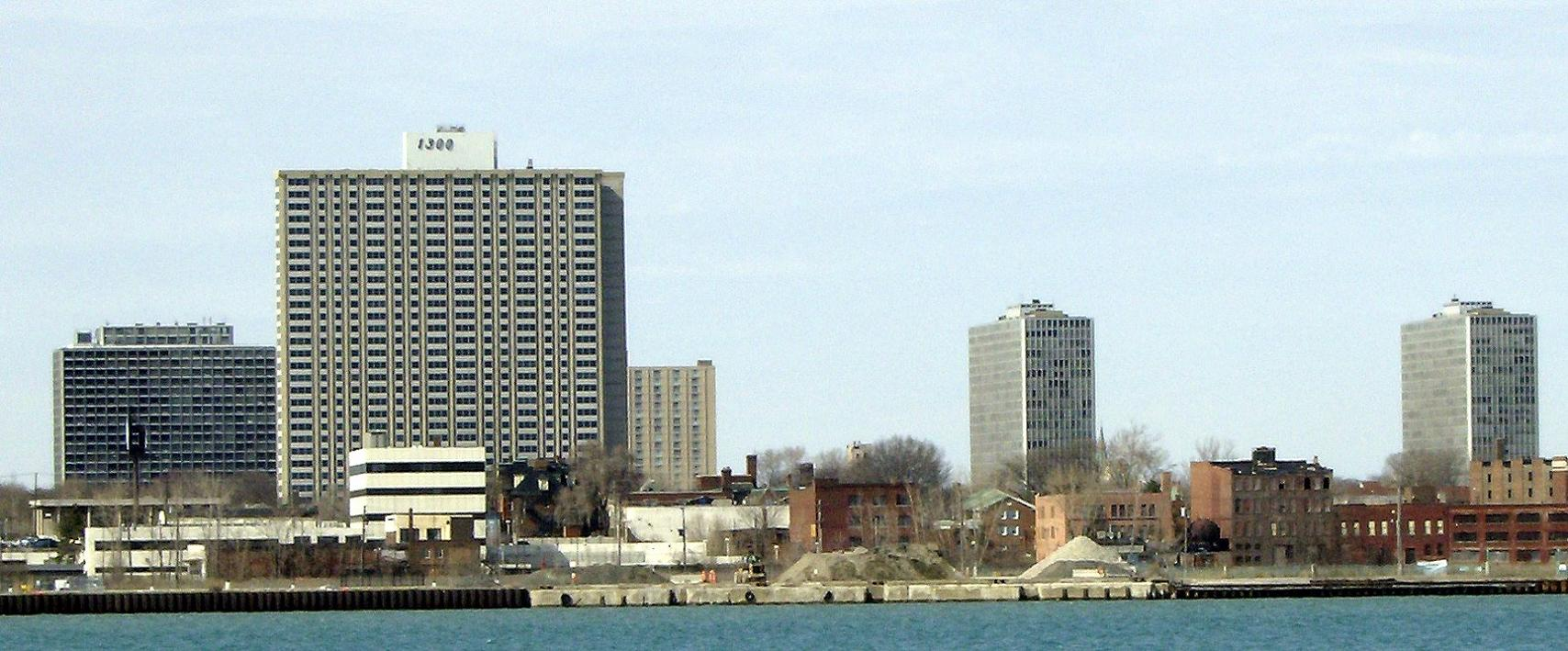
Lafayette Park's constituent apartment buildings

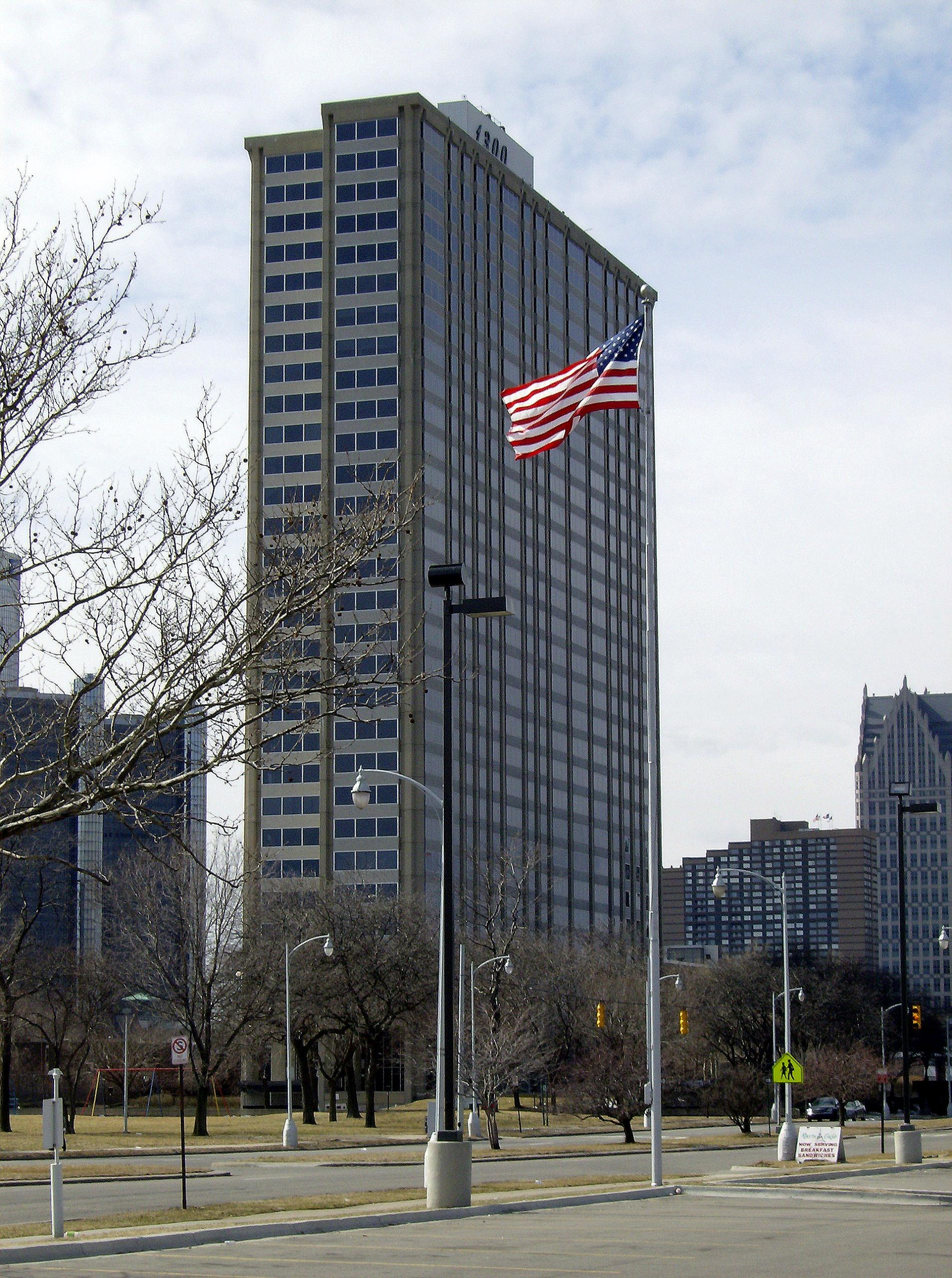
1300 Lafayette East Cooperative

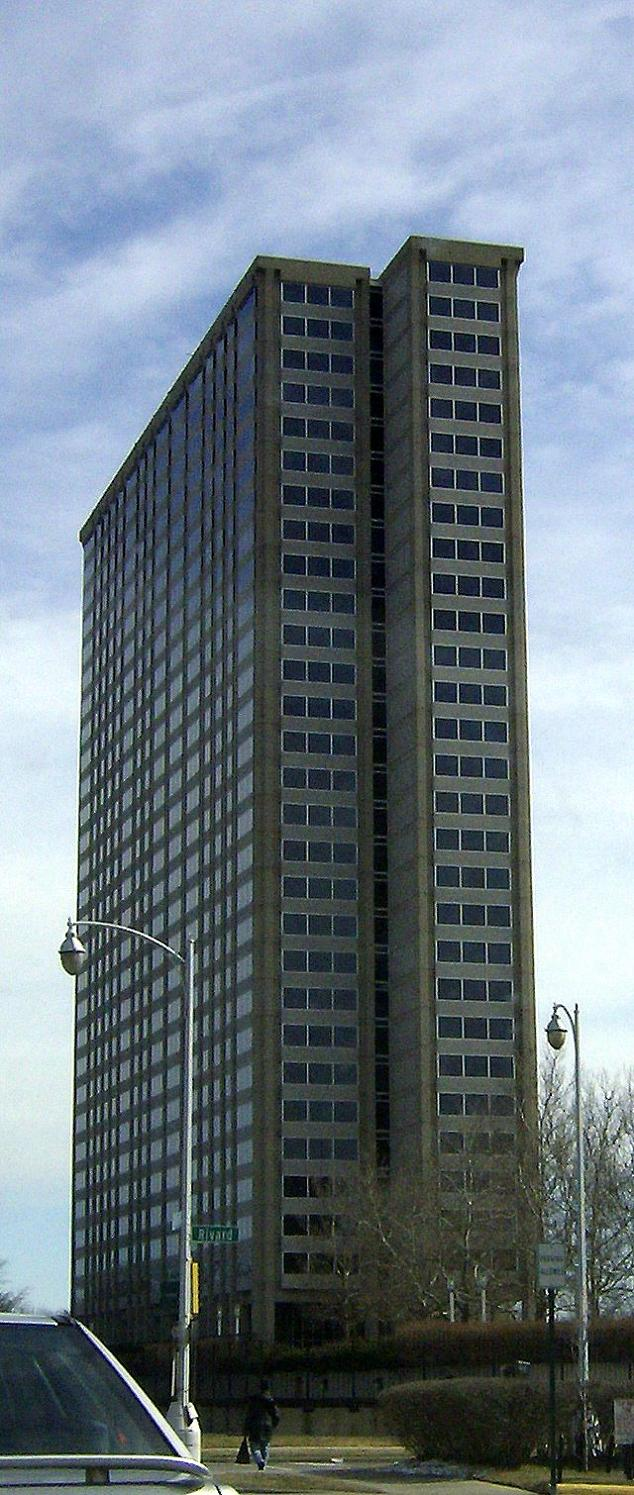
1300 Lafayette East

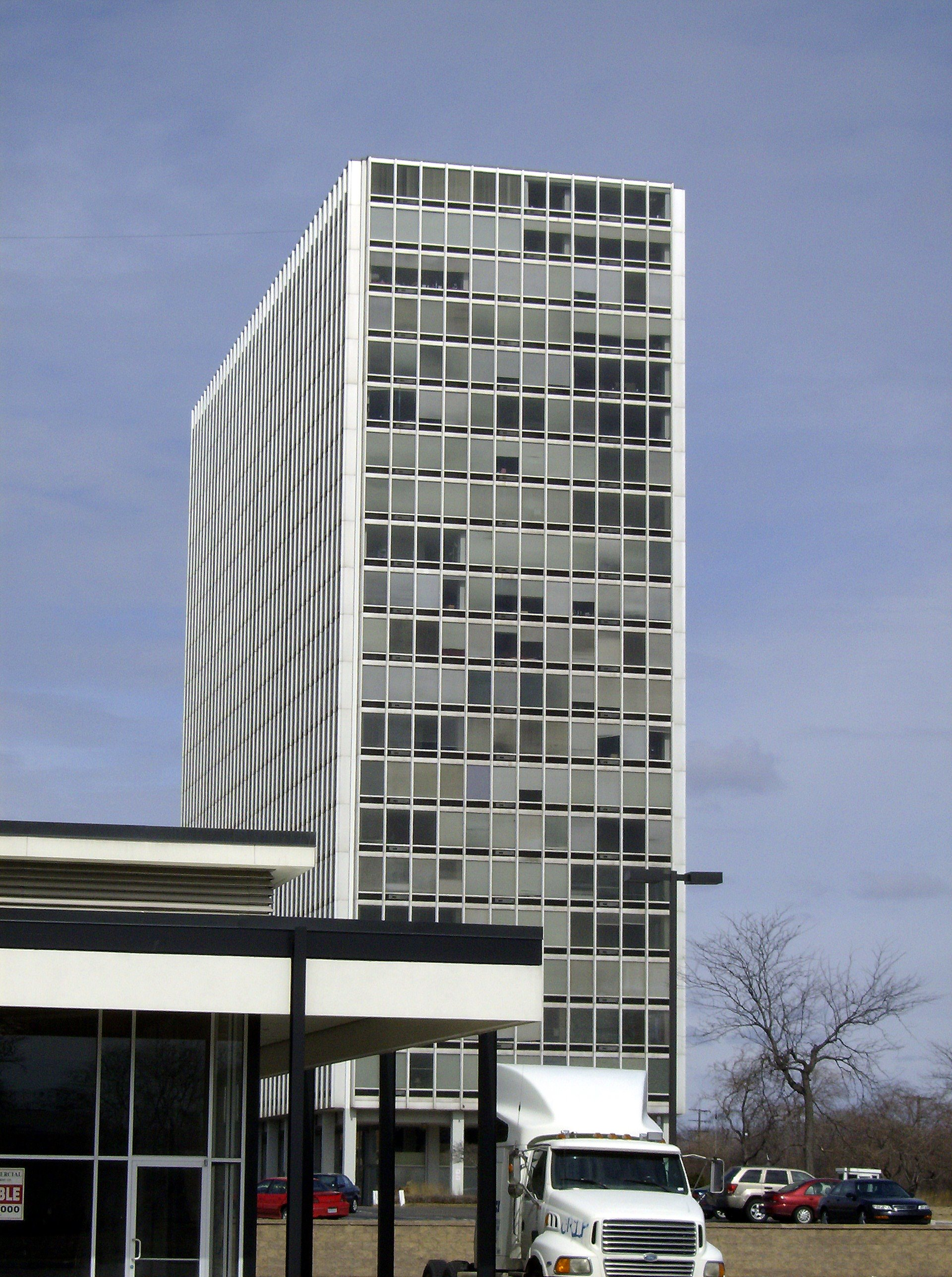
Lafayette Towers Apartments East

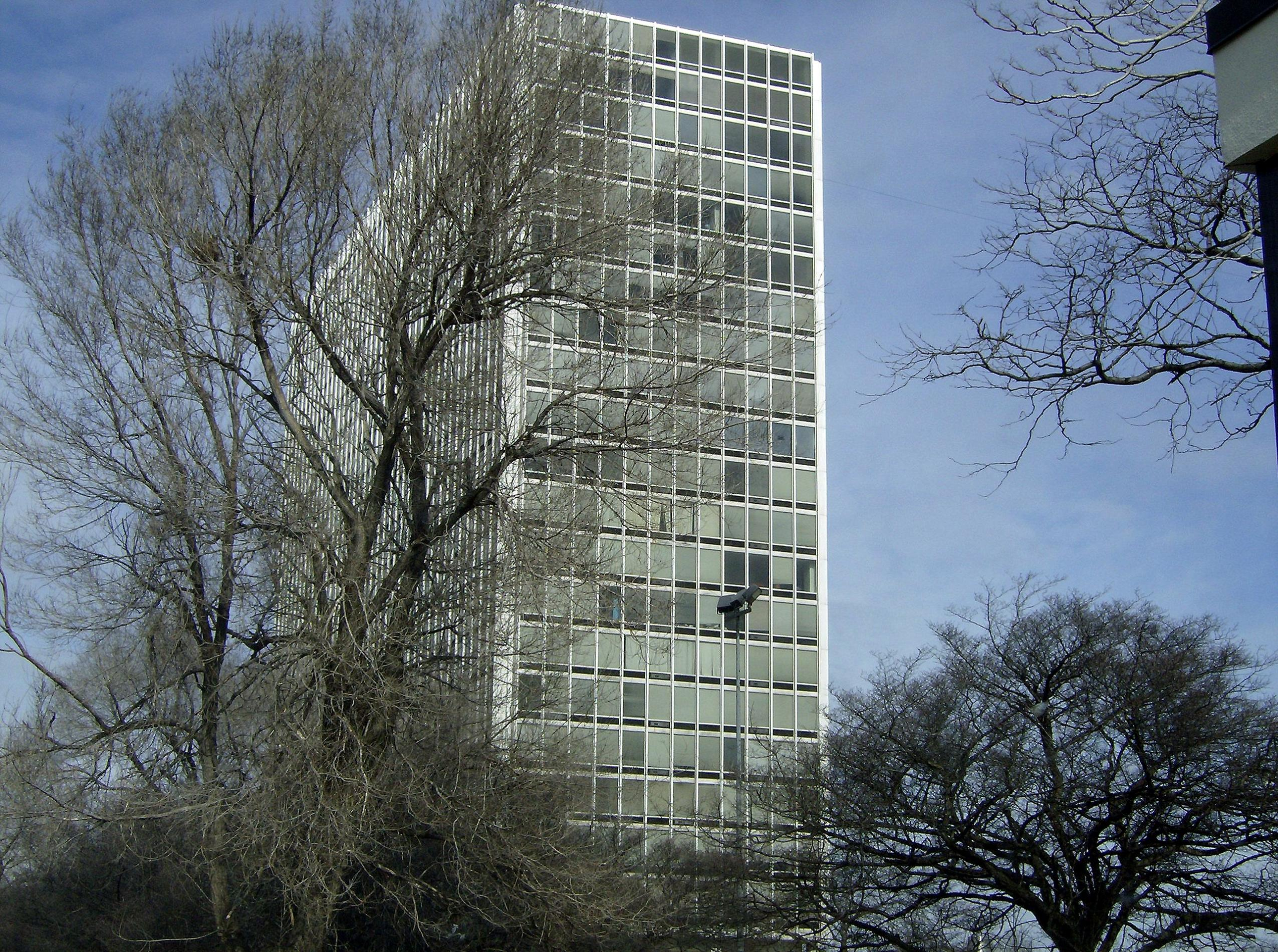
Lafayette Towers Apartments West

== See also ==
- List of National Historic Landmarks in Michigan
- National Register of Historic Places listings in Detroit, Michigan
