= Ludwig Hilberseimer =

German architect and urban planner (1885–1967)

Ludwig Karl Hilberseimer
- Born: September 14, 1885; Karlsruhe, Germany
- Died: May 6, 1967 (aged 81)
- Occupation: Architect
- Projects: Lafayette Park, Detroit

Signature
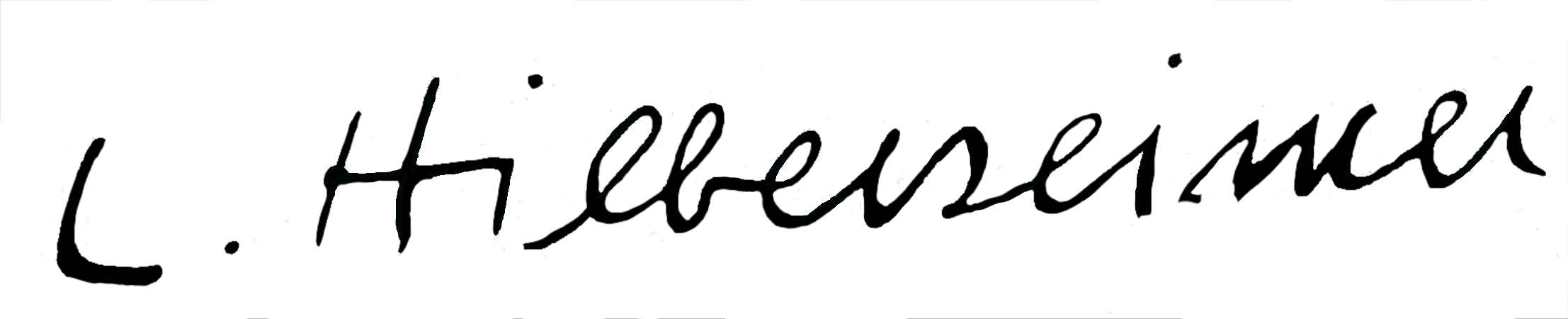

Ludwig Karl Hilberseimer (September 14, 1885 – May 6, 1967) was a German architect and urban planner best known for his ties to the Bauhaus and to Mies van der Rohe, as well as for his work in urban planning at Armour Institute of Technology (now Illinois Institute of Technology), in Chicago, Illinois.

Hilberseimer was born in Karlsruhe, Germany, on 14 September 1885. In 1906, he began his studies in architecture at the Karlsruhe Technical University. Following graduation in 1911, Hilberseimer moved to Berlin where he worked in the office of Heinz Lassen before starting his own practice in 1914. During World War I, he led the planning office for Zeppelinhallenbau (aircraft hangars) in Berlin Staaken. Beginning in 1919, he was member of the Arbeitsrat für Kunst and November Group, worked as independent architect and town planner, and published numerous theoretical writings on art, architecture, and city planning.

In 1929, Hilberseimer was invited to teach at the Bauhaus by then director Hannes Meyer. In July 1933, Hilberseimer and Wassily Kandinsky were the two members of the Bauhaus that the Gestapo identified as problematically left-wing. In 1938, Hilberseimer followed Mies van der Rohe to Chicago where he became director of city planning at the Armour Institute, later renamed the Illinois Institute of Technology. Hilberseimer taught at IIT for several decades before his death in 1967.

== Work ==
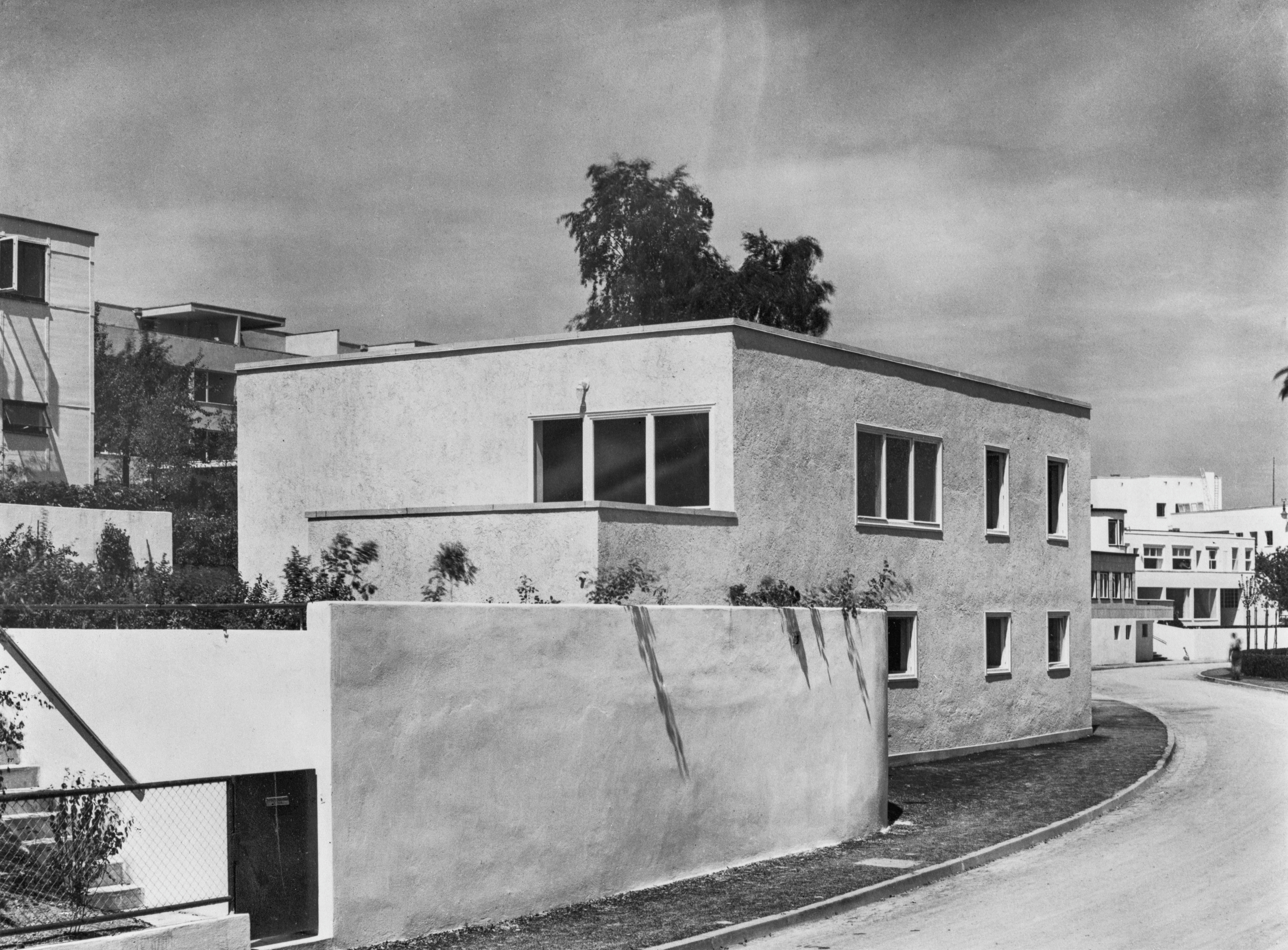
House by Ludwig Hilberseimer in the Weissenhof Estate (1927)

Street hierarchy was first elaborated by Ludwig Hilberseimer in his book Großstadt Architektur [Architecture of the Metropolis], 1927. Hilberseimer emphasized safety for school-age children to walk to school while increasing the speed of the vehicular circulation system.

Beginning in 1929 at the Bauhaus, Hilberseimer developed studies concerning town construction for the decentralization of large cities. Against the background of the economic and political fall of the Weimar Republic he developed a universal and global adaptable planning system (The new town center, 1944), which planned a gradual dissolution of major cities and a complete penetration of landscape and settlement. He proposed that in order to create a sustainable relationship between humans, industry, and nature, human habitation should be built in a way to secure all people against all disasters and crises.

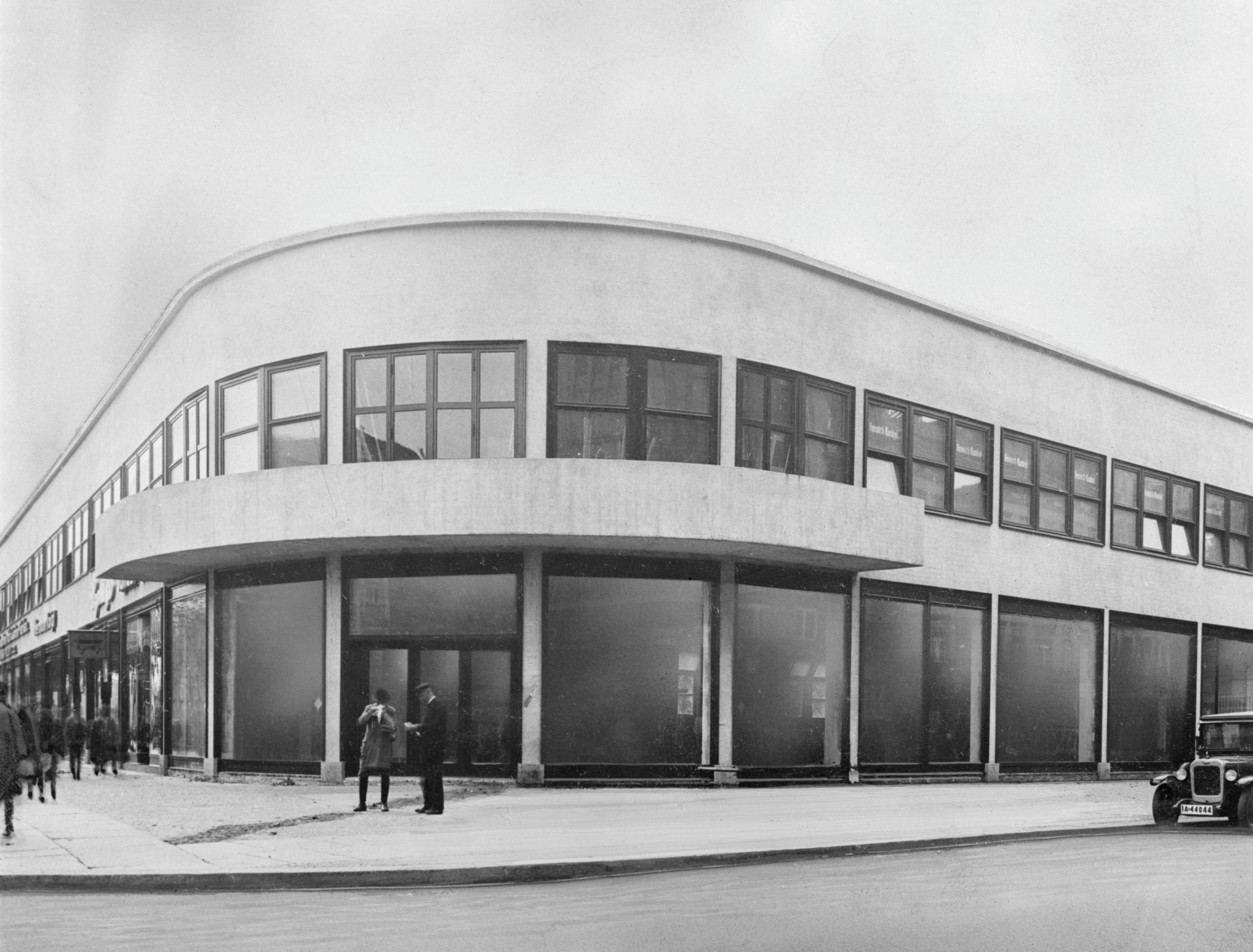
Berlin, Belle-Alliance-Straße 6, Rheinlandhaus

His most notable built project is Lafayette Park, Detroit, an urban renewal project designed in collaboration with architect Mies van der Rohe and landscape architect Alfred Caldwell.

The Ludwig Karl Hilberseimer Papers collection, including drawings, photographs, and other printed material, is held by the Ryerson & Burnham Libraries in the Art Institute of Chicago.

== Selected Writings of Ludwig Hilberseimer ==
- Großstadtbauten [Buildings for the Metropolis], Hanover: Aposs Verlag, 1925.
- Großstadt Architektur [Architecture of the Metropolis], Stuttgart: Julius Hoffman, 1927.
- Beton als Gestalter [Concrete as Formgiver], with Dr. Julius Vi, Stuttgart: Julius Hoffmann, 1928.
- Neue Internationale Architektur [New International Architecture], Stuttgart: Julius Hofmann, 1928.
- Hallen Bauten [Assembly Buildings], Leipzig: J.M. Gerhardt, 1931.
- The New City : Principles of Planning, Chicago: Paul Theobald, 1944.
- The New Regional Pattern : Industries and Gardens, Workshops and Farms, Chicago: Paul Theobald, 1949.
- The Nature of Cities : Origin, Growth, and Decline; Pattern and Form; Planning Problems, Chicago: Paul Theobald, 1955.
- Mies van der Rohe, Chicago: Paul Theobald, 1956.
- Entfaltung einer Planungsidee [Development of a Planning Concept], Bauwelt Fundamente 6, Berlin: 1963.
- Contemporary Architecture : Its Roots and Trends, Chicago: Paul Theobald, 1964.
- Berliner Architektur der 20er Jahre [Berlin Architecture of the 1920s], Mainz, Berlin: Kupferberg, 1967.

== Selected Writings About Ludwig Hilberseimer ==
- Colman, Scott. Ludwig Hilberseimer : Reanimating Architecture and the City, London: Bloomsbury Visual Arts, 2023.
- Köhler, Daniel. 2016. The Mereological City : A Reading of the Works of Ludwig Hilberseimer, Bielefeld: Transcript, 2016.
- Pommer, Richard, David A. Spaeth, Kevin Harrington, and Ludwig Hilberseimer. In the Shadow of Mies : Ludwig Hilberseimer, Architect, Educator, and Urban Planner. Chicago: Art Institute of Chicago, 1988.
- Waldheim, Charles. CASE--Hilberseimer/Mies van Der Rohe, Lafayette Park Detroit. Munich, New York: Prestel; Cambridge, Mass.: Harvard University Graduate School of Design, 2004.

== Weblinks ==
- "Ludwig Hilberseimer | Ute Poerschke & Kevin Harrington" on bauhaus faces podcast, host: Dr. Anja Guttenberger, published on Dec 16, 2025 (Feb. 17, 2026)
