= Huron Towers =

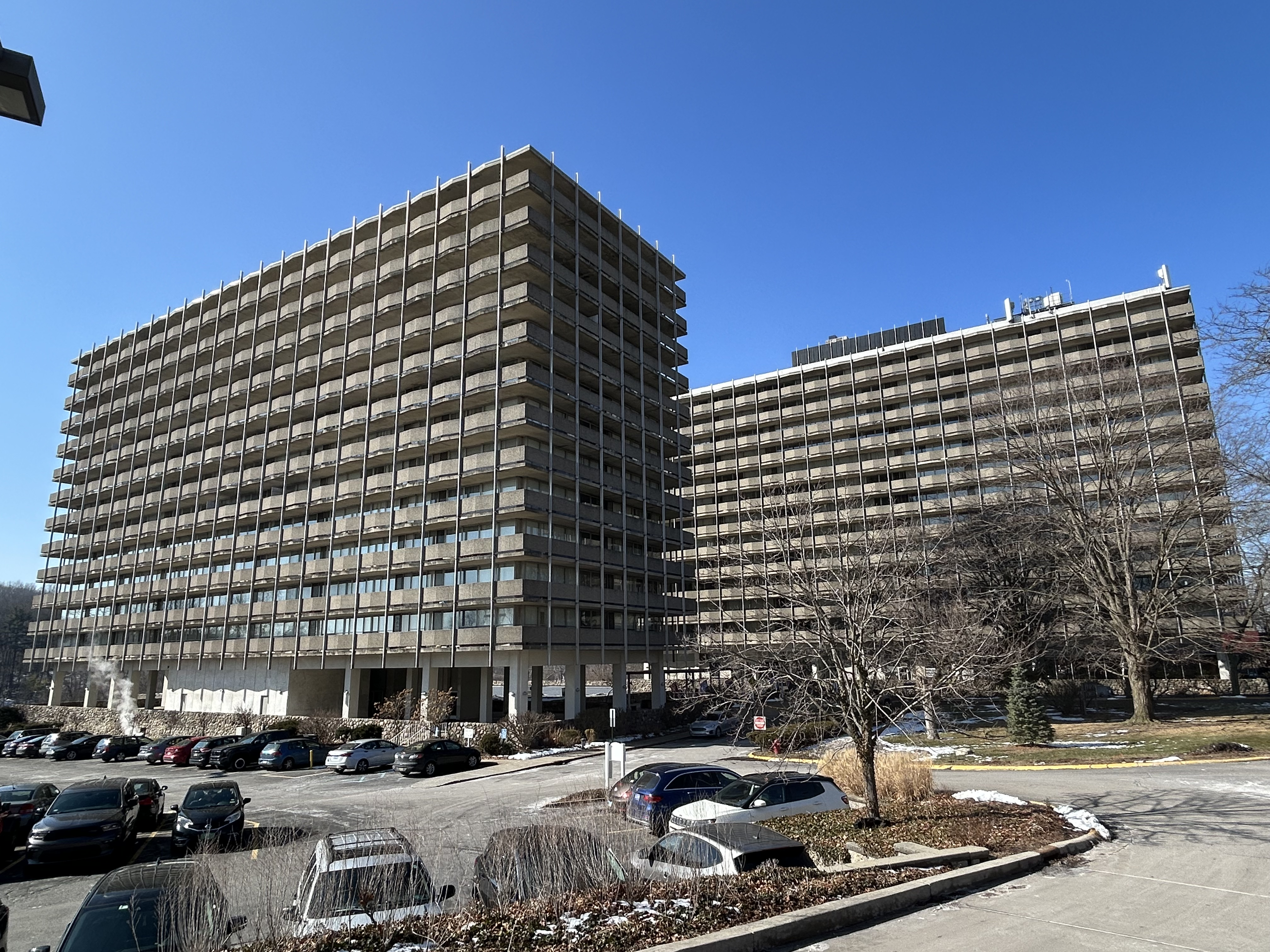
- View of the towers from the north, 2026

General information
- Type: Twin residential towers
- Architectural style: Modern
- Location: 2200-2222 Fuller Court, Ann Arbor, Michigan, United States
- Coordinates: 42.285308°N 83.716829°W
- Construction started: 1959
- Opened: 1961
- Cost: US$7 million (1959)

Technical details
- Structural system: Lift slab construction
- Floor count: 12

Design and construction
- Architects: King & Lewis
- Developer: Morton Scholnick and Seymour Dunitz

Huron Towers is a pair of residential towers in Ann Arbor, Michigan, on a hillside overlooking the Huron River. The towers opened in 1960 as the first high-rise apartment development in the city in decades, and were designed to emphasize their novel lift-slab construction technique. The identical towers contain a total of 360 apartments on 12 floors above ground, atop a 3-story underground parking garage.

The towers were the subject of a series of financial disputes from the late 1960s through the early 1980s after the developers sold the property to an affiliate of the Michigan Education Association, who intended to convert the complex to a retirement community for teachers. The teachers' retirement community failed after the revelation that it had paid nearly double the building's market value, leading to an extended foreclosure process.

== History ==
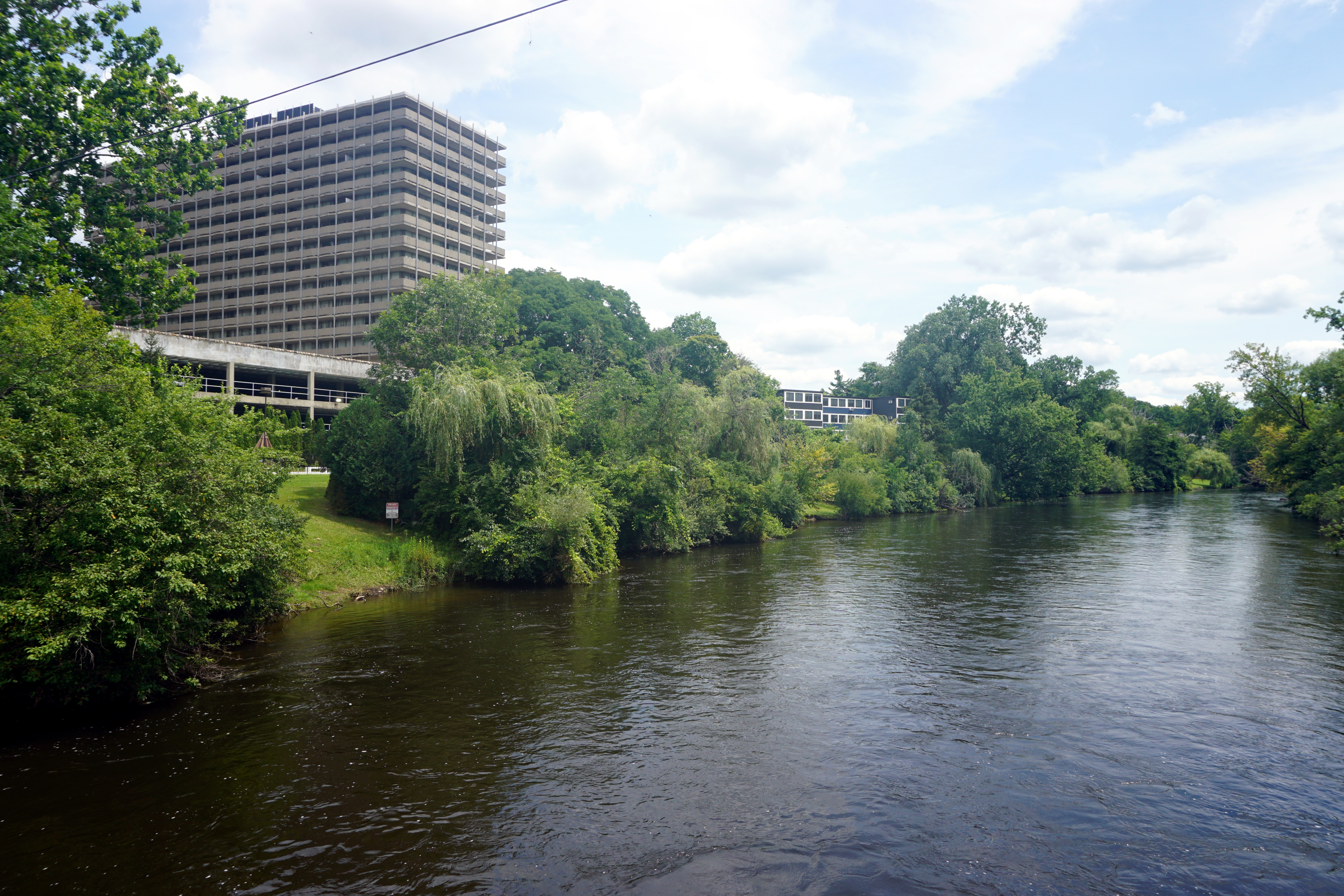
The towers overlook the Huron River, situated on a steep grade

The Huron Towers complex is located east of downtown Ann Arbor, on the north bank of the Huron River. Previous high-rise development in Ann Arbor included the First National Bank Building and the Burton Memorial Tower, both built in the 1930s and located in the city center.

At the time of the towers' construction in the late 1950s, the area east of downtown was rapidly developing. The University of Michigan's North Campus was under construction to the north of the site, with the first buildings completed in the early 1950s and the Ford Nuclear Reactor reaching criticality in 1957. A new high-rise Veterans Affairs hospital opened adjacent to the Huron Towers site in 1953, built to a standard mid-century modern design that differed significantly from pre-World War II VA facilities.

Huron Towers was developed by Morton Scholnick and Seymour Dunitz, a pair of Detroit-area property developers who had been in partnership for 14 years. The towers used the lift slab construction technique, developed by University of Michigan professor Philip N. Youtz and Texas businessman Tom Slick. The lift-slab method uses slabs of reinforced concrete, which are cast on the ground and lifted into place to form the building's floor structure. Construction work began in May 1959, and was delayed by the 1959 steel industry strike.

The towers were completed in early 1961, and immediately faced financial issues. 29% of apartments were occupied in September 1961, rising to 65% in 1963 and 92% in 1964. The towers were constructed at a cost of approximately $7 million (equivalent to $59 million in 2025), over $6 million of which was funded by a mortgage insured by the United States Department of Housing and Urban Development (HUD). Scholnick and Dunitz terminated their professional partnership after the building was completed, although Dunitz retained his financial stake.

In 1969, the Michigan Education Homes Association bought the building. The MEHA was an affiliate of the Michigan Education Association teachers' union, and sought to build a housing complex for retired teachers in nearby Saline before it settled on purchasing Huron Towers. The MEHA agreed to a purchase price of $8 million, which was nearly double the towers' actual value. The building was 99% occupied, and the MEHA took over the existing mortgage with its favorable interest rate. The MEHA's financial situation remained unsustainable, and it defaulted on the mortgage in 1971. The Detroit Free Press described the situation in 1973 as "a story about the way the rich got richer and schoolteachers got stuck."

HUD took ownership of the towers through foreclosure in 1977. A group of Huron Towers residents formed a housing cooperative in the late 1970s, hoping to buy the complex from HUD. The group gained the support of 50% of residents, fewer than the 70% required by HUD to entertain the offer, and the building was sold to a Los Angeles-based property manager for $6.5 million in 1983.

== Architecture and construction ==
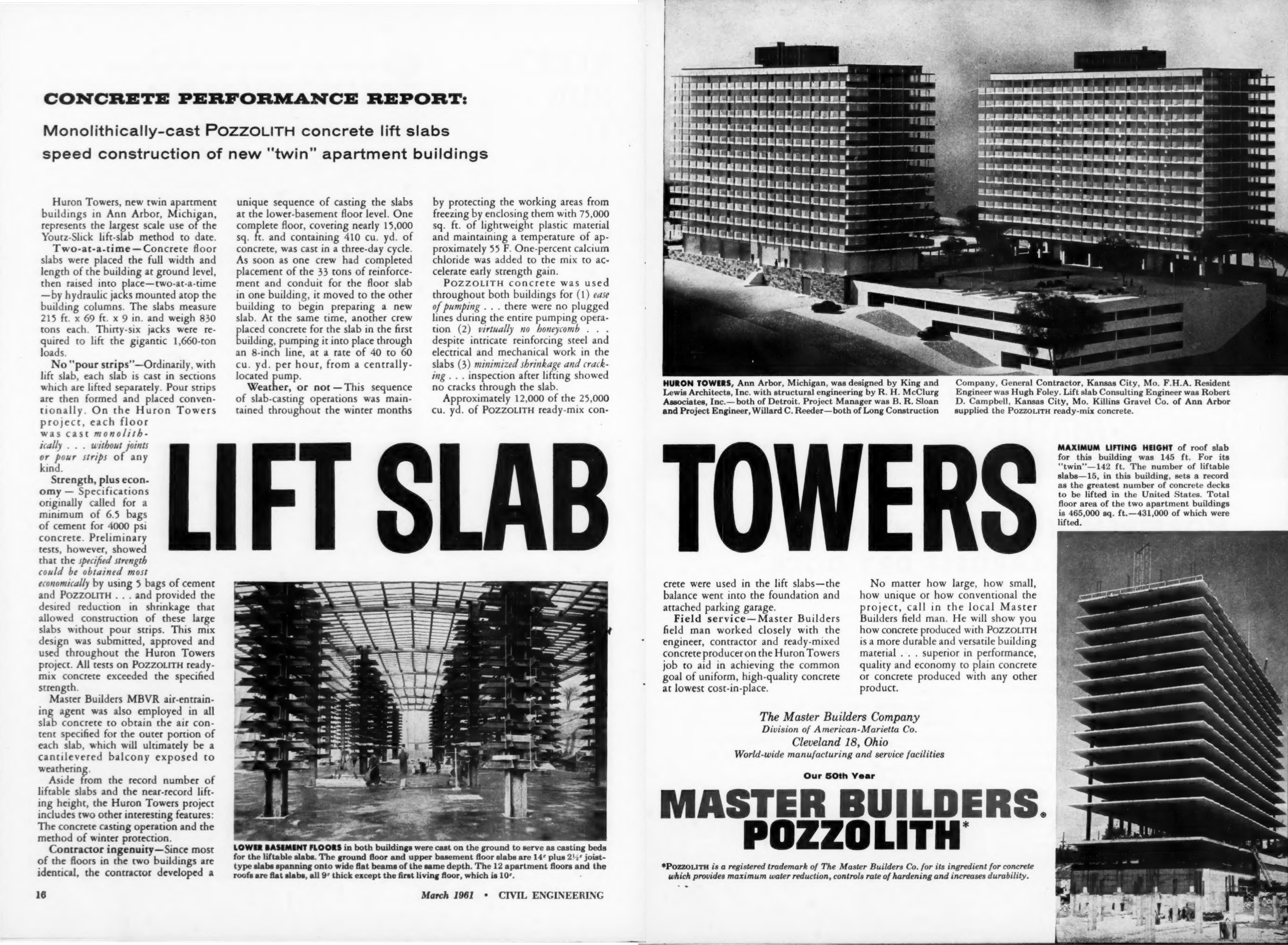
Advertisement for the concrete technology used in the towers

Huron Towers were built with the novel lift-slab method of concrete construction. The lift-slab method, also known as the Youtz-Slick method for its inventors Philip Youtz and Tom Slick, utilizes a vertical steel structure with reinforced concrete slab floors.

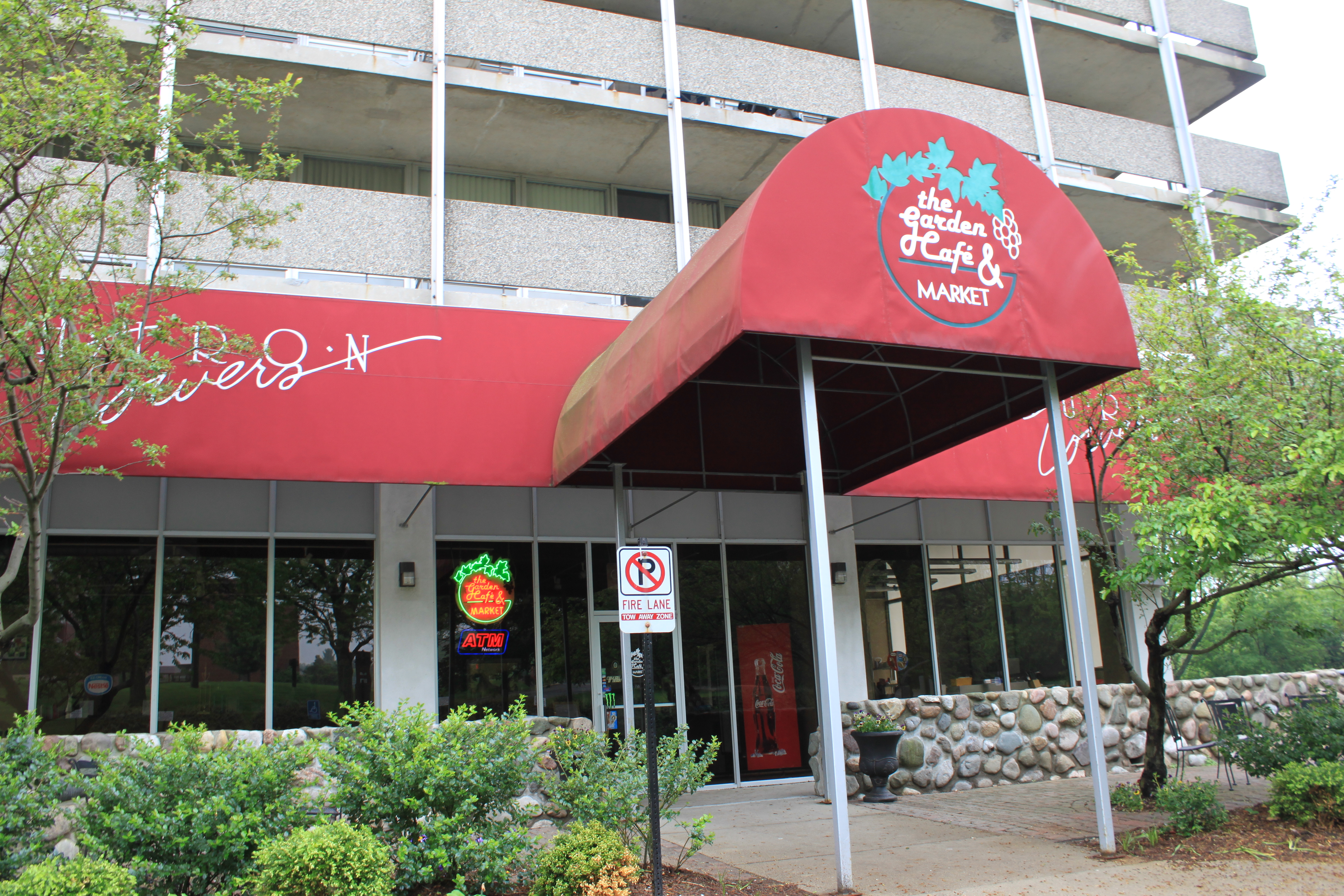
The edges of the concrete slab floors are visible from the exterior, contrasting with fieldstone accents at ground level

The defining characteristic of the lift-slab method is that the slabs are cast at ground level and lifted into place on the building's vertical steel structure. The 12 upper floors of the towers use 9-inch (23 cm) concrete slabs, weighing 820 short tons (730 long tons; 740 t), which are exposed on the exterior of the building. The ground floor and basement slabs are thicker, up to 14 inches (36 cm). The upper floor slabs were lifted by 36 hydraulic jacks connected by an electronic control system, proceeding at a pace of approximately 9 inches (23 cm) per hour. A heated shelter was built over the work area to allow concrete work to proceed through the winter.

The towers were designed by the architectural firm of King & Lewis, a Detroit firm headed by Harry King and Maxwell Lewis. The firm's other designs include the Campus Inn (the present-day Graduate Hotel) and Tower Plaza in Ann Arbor, and the Fort Pontchartrain Hotel in Detroit.

The vertical structure of the building is set back from the edge of the slabs, exposing the edge of the slabs and providing a continuous balcony structure around the building. The exterior wall of the towers is a glass curtain wall, providing apartment units a view of the surrounding river valley. Fieldstone walls at the base of the towers serve as a contrast to the concrete structure.

== See also ==
- University Towers
