= Lafayette Pavilion Apartments =

Coordinates: 42.3402°N 83.0370°W

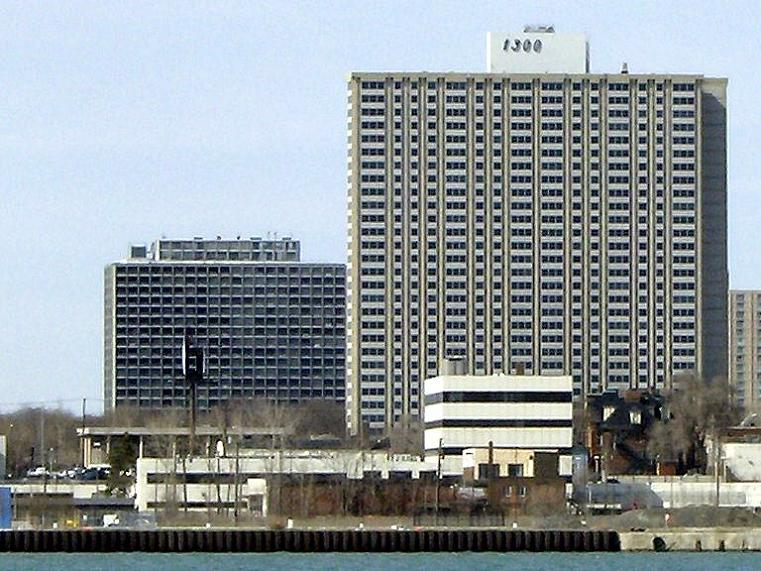
Lafayette Pavilion Apartment is the smaller building in the background.

Lafayette Pavilion Apartments is a high-rise residential apartment building in Detroit, Michigan, United States. It is located at 1 Lafayette Plaisance, near Gratiot Avenue and I-375, near Chene Park.

Construction began in 1955 and was completed in 1958. The building, whose exterior was constructed primarily of aluminum and glass, is 22 floors in height, and was designed in the international architectural style.

The Lafayette Pavilion Apartments are one of four towers in the Lafayette Park development. The other three are the Windsor Tower, Lafayette Towers Apartments West, and Lafayette Towers Apartments East.

Along with Lafayette Park's other neighboring Ludwig Mies van der Rohe-designed buildings, this building was added to the National Register of Historic Places in 1996.
