= Robert Sharoff =

Robert Sharoff is a Chicago-based architectural writer and author. He has written for a variety of publications including the New York Times, the Washington Post, the Chicago Tribune, and Chicago Magazine. He frequently collaborates with photographer William Zbaren.

== Bibliography ==
- American City: Detroit Architecture 1845-2005 (photographs by William Zbaren)
- Lucien Lagrange: The Search for Elegance (photographs by William Zbaren)
- American City: St. Louis Architecture, Three Centuries of Classic Design (photographs by William Zbaren)
- Last Is More: Mies, IBM, and the Transformation of Chicago (photographs by William Zbaren)
- John Vinci: Life and Landmarks (photographs by William Zbaren)

== See also ==
- Architecture of metropolitan Detroit
