= University Tower (Mexico City) =

General information
- Location: Mexico City, Paseo de la Reforma 150, Juárez, Cuauhtémoc, Mexico
- Year built: 2019–present

Height
- Height: 203 m (666 ft)

Technical details
- Floor count: 58

Design and construction
- Architect: Enrique Macotela

Other information
- Public transit: Reforma

Website
- universitytower.mx

University Tower is an under-construction mixed-use skyscraper in Paseo de la Reforma, Cuauhtémoc, Mexico City. The building is 203 meters (666 ft) tall and has 58 floors. By 2026, construction was already underway on the upper floors of the building, although the lower floors had already been completed and handed over. University Tower was designed by the architect Enrique Macotela.

== History ==
University Club in 2023

The building under construction in 2023

The building's construction began in 2019 next to the University Club, also known as Casa Gargollo, a social club for college students founded in 1905. University Tower is tower with 58 floors. Up to Floor 47, it will be used for residential space, with 525 apartments; the reminder will serve as offices. It is found along Paseo de la Reforma Avenue, in Cuauhtémoc, Mexico City. It is close to the Metrobús system at Reforma station, serving Lines 1 and 7. The building has a private garden on roofs 10 and 11, the tallest in the neighborhood. The apartments range in size from 31 31 square meters (330 sq ft) to 140 meters (460 ft).

Its architect was Enrique Macotela, and was developed by Desarrolladora Del Parque, owned by Enrique Téllez. It is designed to withstand earthquakes and high winds, and the parking garage is located in the basement. The facility is built with concrete, fire-resistant materials, and incorporates a gas-free system and a stormwater treatment plant. Two of the building's facades face Paseo de la Reforma because the structure is rotated 45 degrees. The University Club building also received restoration works.

By 2025, 95 percent of the exterior and 70 percent of the interior were complete, and three-quarters of the properties were reported as sold. With a height of 203 meters (666 ft), it is one of the tallest buildings in the country.

Neighbors complained that the project lacked community consensus. Additionally, the building permits were processed in 2023, and that the project did not have the approval of Mexico City's Institute for Construction Safety as of 2024. Furthermore, the original project called for the construction of 488 housing units.
