= Lafayette Towers Apartments East =

Apartment building in Detroit, Michigan

Coordinates: 42.34018°N 83.03301°W

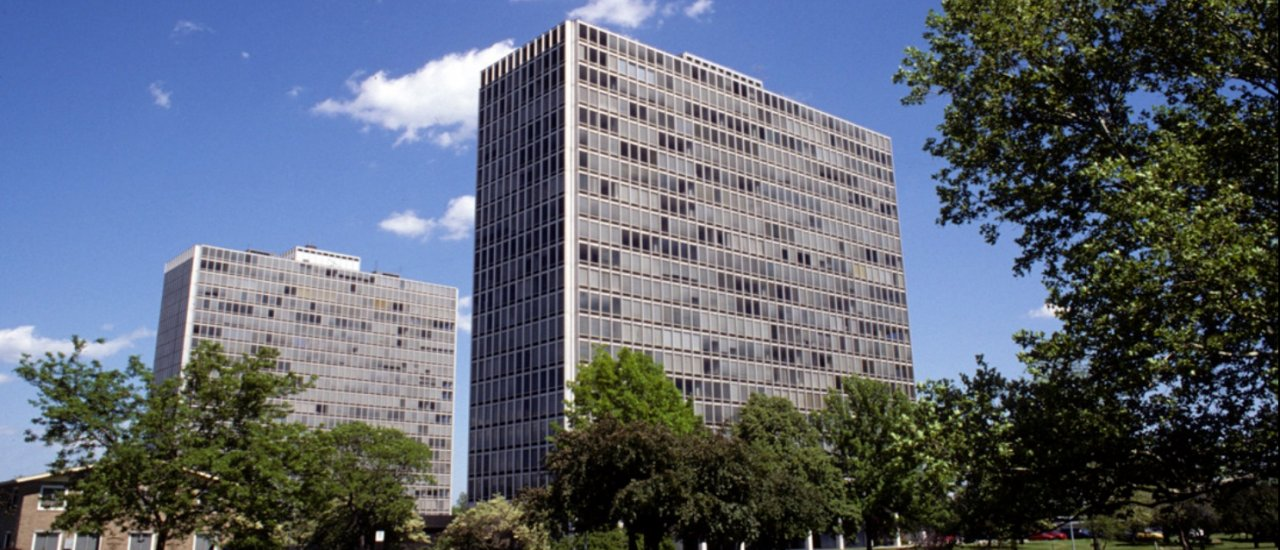
Lafayette Towers Apartments East.

Lafayette Towers Apartments East is at 1301 Orleans Street in the Lafayette Park development near downtown Detroit, Michigan. It is one of two identical apartment buildings designed by Ludwig Mies van der Rohe; the other is Lafayette Towers Apartments West. Both the Lafayette Towers Apartments were built in 1963 and stand at 22 stories in height. They were designed in the International style of architecture, much like the Lafayette Pavilion Apartments, and the other buildings in the development. The primary materials for the facades are aluminium and glass.

== Lafayette Park development ==
Along with the other neighboring Mies van der Rohe-designed buildings, this building was added to the National Register of Historic Places in 1996.

This is one of four towers in the Lafayette Park development. The others are the Windsor Tower, the Lafayette Pavilion Apartments, and the Lafayette Towers Apartments West.
