= Gunnar Birkerts =

American architect

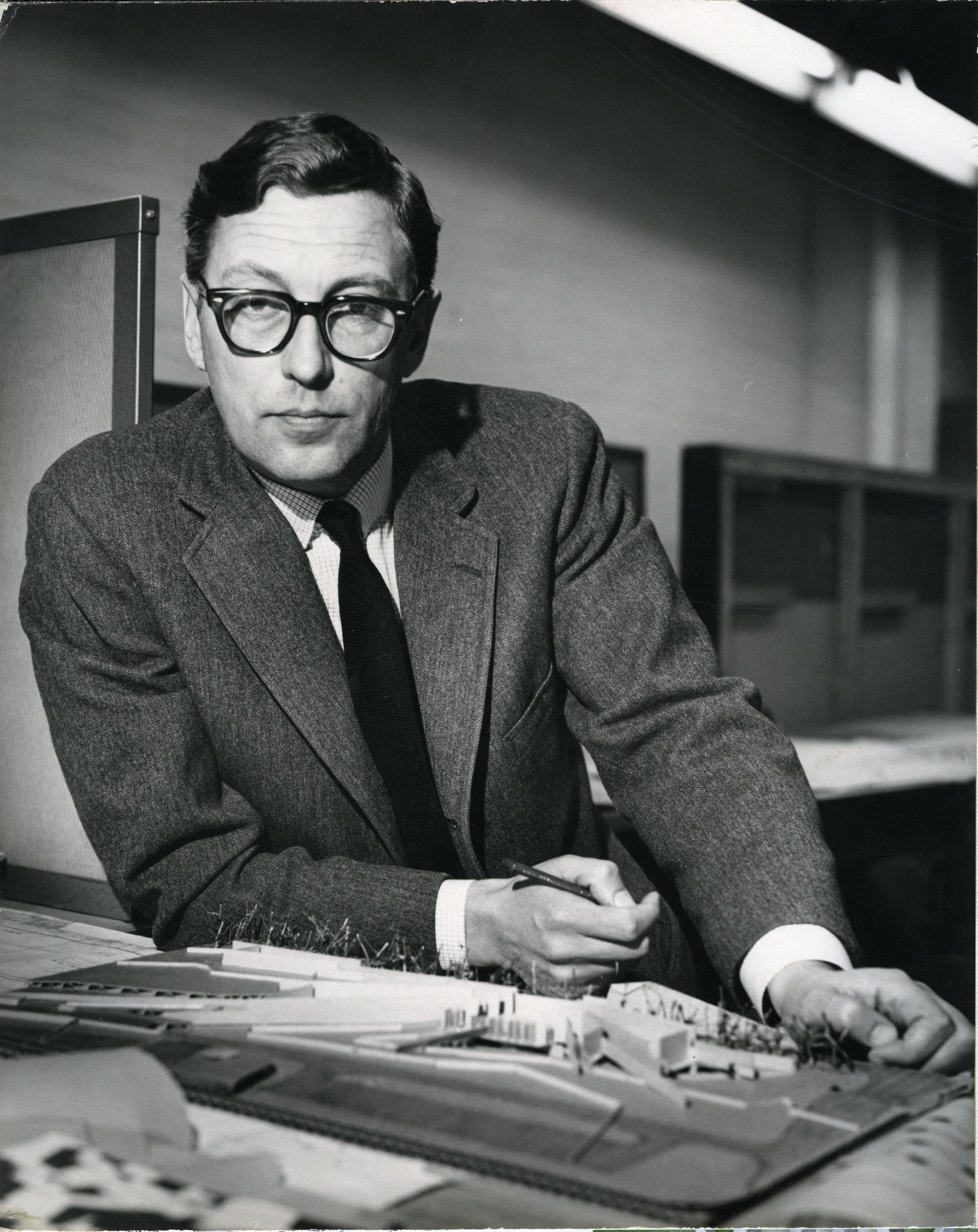
- Birkerts in 1968
- Born: January 17, 1925; Riga, Latvia
- Died: August 15, 2017 (aged 92); Needham, Massachusetts, United States
- Education: Technische Hochschule, Stuttgart
- Occupation: Architect
- Children: Sven and Andra Birkerts
- Awards: Fellow of the AIA
- Practice: Birkerts and Straub, Birkerts and Associates
- Buildings: Corning Fire Station, Corning Museum of Glass, Minneapolis Federal Reserve Bank, National Library of Latvia

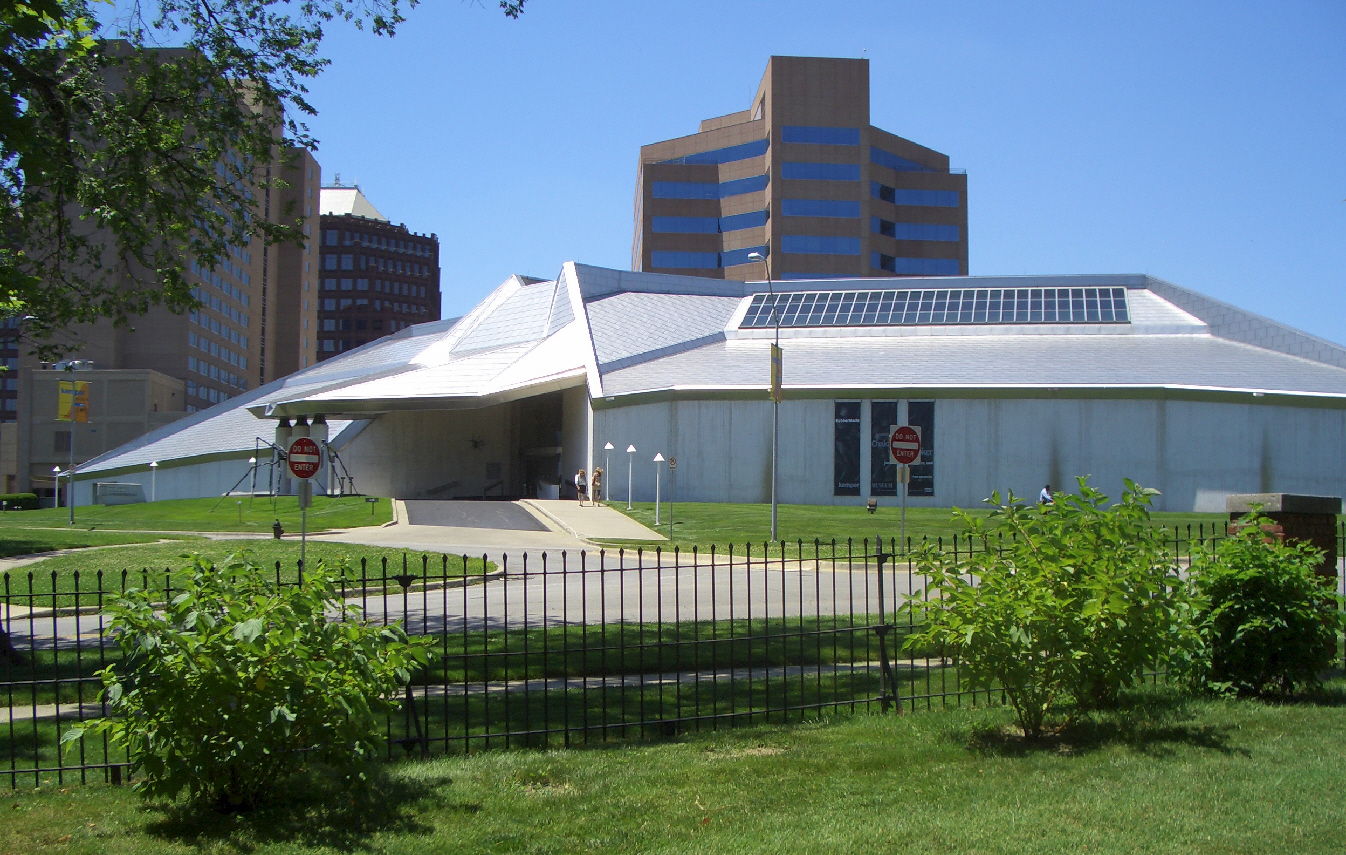
Kemper Museum of Contemporary Art, Kansas City, Missouri, designed by Gunnar Birkerts, 1992–1994.

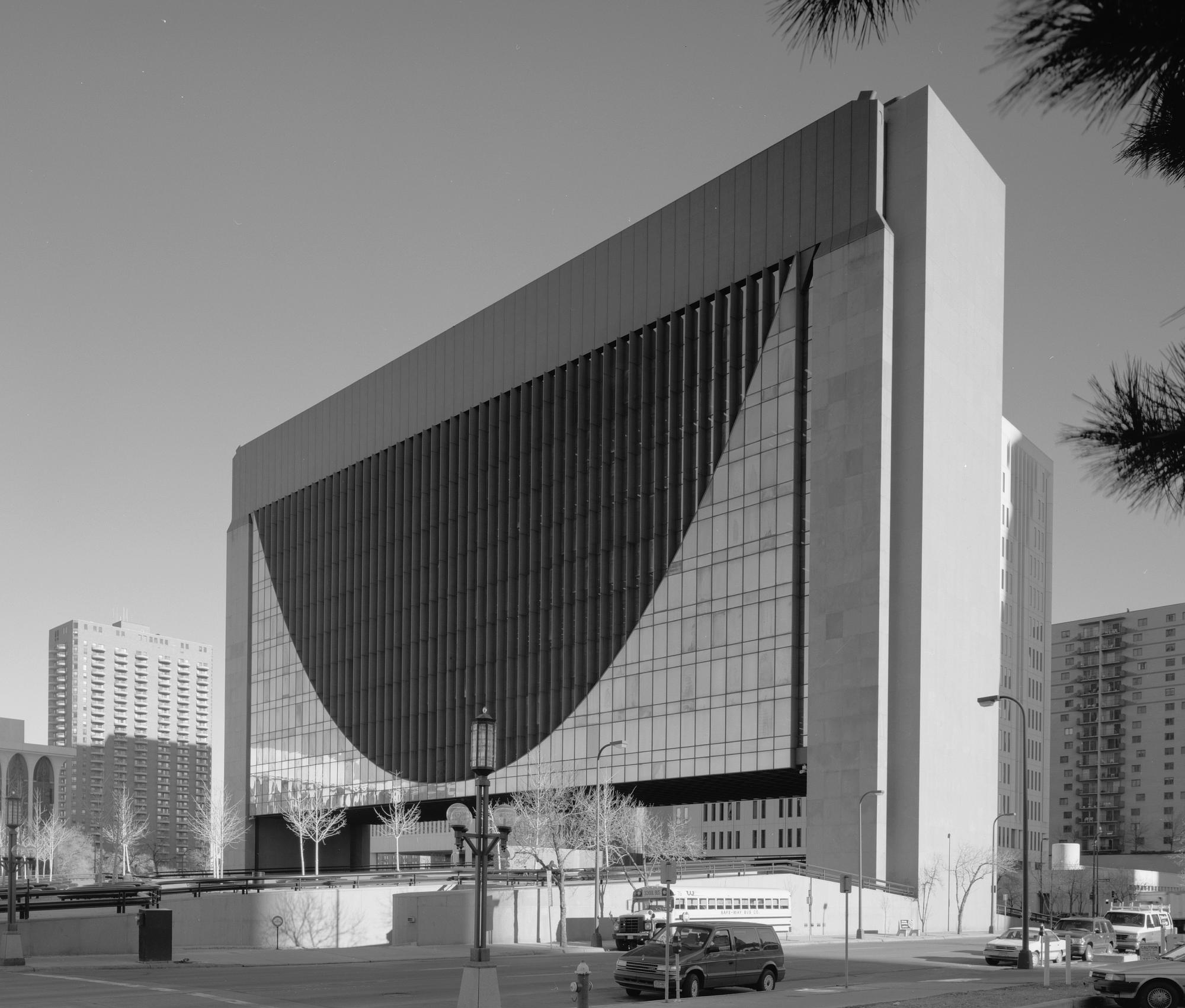
Federal Reserve Bank of Minneapolis, 1973, (now: Marquette Plaza), in its original configuration.

Gunnar Birkerts (Latvian: Gunārs Birkerts, January 17, 1925 – August 15, 2017) was a Latvian American architect who, for the most of his career, was based in the metropolitan area of Detroit, Michigan.

Some of his notable designs include the Corning Museum of Glass and the Corning Fire Station in Corning, New York; Marquette Plaza in Minneapolis, Minnesota; the Kemper Museum of Contemporary Art in Kansas City, Missouri; and the U.S. Embassy in Caracas, Venezuela.

In 2014, the National Library of Latvia in Riga was completed to his design.

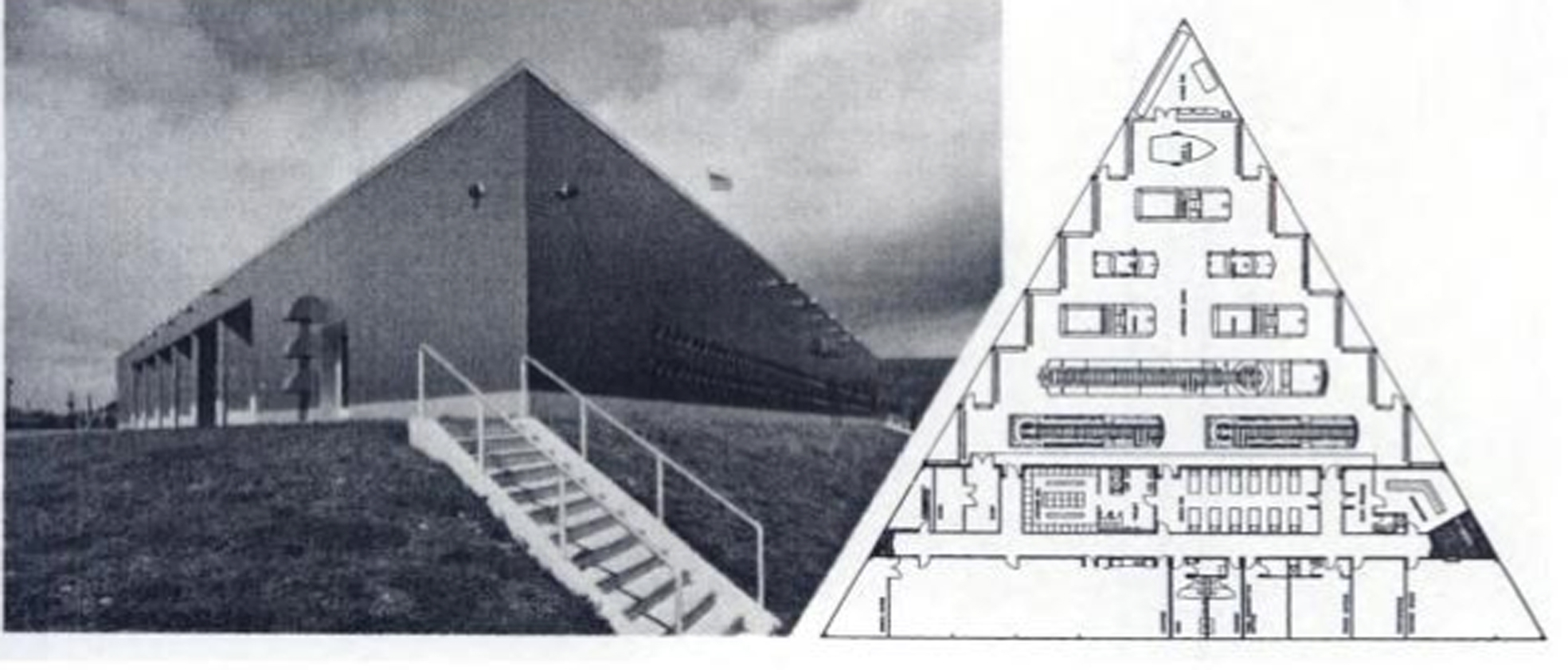
The Corning Fire Station facade and floor plan. The building has a strict form where small vehicles are placed in the narrow portion at the tip. All function spaces have been baked into the base of the triangle, such as changing rooms, storage room, dining room, dormitory and office, where all rooms are accessed via a wide corridor.

== Biography ==
Birkerts was born and raised in Latvia, but escaped ahead of the advancing Soviet army toward the end of the Second World War. He graduated from the Technische Hochschule, Stuttgart, Germany, in 1949. He acknowledged being influenced by Scandinavian tradition and the Finnish architect Alvar Aalto.

Birkerts emigrated to the United States that year and initially worked for Perkins and Will, a global design practice based in Chicago. He moved to the Detroit area in the early 1950s, where he worked for Eero Saarinen, and was a chief designer for Minoru Yamasaki before opening his own office in the city's suburbs. Birkerts also maintained an architectural office in Wellesley, Massachusetts.

He initially practiced in the partnership Birkerts and Straub. In 1963, he set up Gunnar Birkerts and Associates in Birmingham, Michigan.

The firm received Honor Awards for its projects from the (national) American Institute of Architects in 1962, 1970, 1973, as well as numerous awards from the Michigan Society of Architects and the local chapter.

Birkerts joined the faculty at the University of Michigan in 1959 and taught until 1990. The ACSA (Association of Collegiate Schools of Architecture) honored Birkerts with the ACSA Distinguished Professor Award in 1989–90.

Birkerts designed a number of notable buildings in the United States, including the Federal Reserve Bank in Minneapolis, Corning Glass Museum, the Contemporary Arts Museum Houston, the University of Iowa College of Law, the Duluth Public Library in Duluth, Minnesota, and the U.S. Embassy in Caracas, Venezuela.

In 1989, Birkerts was commissioned to design the new building for the National Library of Latvia in Riga, Latvia, which had great personal meaning for him. Also known as the Castle of Light, he drew from Latvian folklore about the Glass Mountain for its architectural form. The building was constructed over the period 2008 to 2014.

== Legacy and honors ==
In 1970, Birkerts was selected as a Fellow of the American Institute of Architects, and a Fellow of the Latvian Architect Association in 1971. He received numerous individual awards, including a 1971 fellowship from the Graham Foundation, the Gold Medal of the Michigan Society of Architects in 1980, the Arnold W. Brunner Memorial Prize in Architecture of the American Academy and Institute of Arts and Letters in 1981, and the 1993 Michigan Artist of the Year award. He received an honorary doctorate from Riga Technical University in 1990, the Order of the Three Stars from the Republic of Latvia in 1995 and the Great Medal of the Latvian Academy of Sciences in 2000.

Birkerts was an honorary professor at The University of Illinois and was the Architect-In-Residence at the American Academy in Rome. He also was a member of the Latvian Union of Architects, honorary member of the Latvian Academy of Sciences and a foreign member of the Riga Technical University.

== Personal life ==
Birkerts married Sylvia, who survived him. They have three grown children, Sven Birkerts, a literary critic and professor; Andra Birkerts, an interior designer specializing in residential work; and Erik Birkerts.

Gunnar Birkerts died at the age of 92 on August 15, 2017, in Needham, Massachusetts, of congestive heart failure.

== Architectural work ==
Perkins+Will

- Rockford Memorial Hospital, Rockford, Illinois 1950

Eero Saarinen

- GM Tech Center, Warren, Michigan 1950–1955
- Milwaukee County War Memorial Building, Milwaukee, Wisconsin 1950–1955
- Kresge Auditorium at MIT, Cambridge, Massachusetts 1953
- Concordia Senior College, Fort Wayne, Indiana 1953
- Irwin Union Bank and Trust, Columbus, Indiana 1954

Minoru Yamasaki

- Lambert-St. Louis International Airport Main Terminal, St. Louis, Missouri 1956
- Reynolds Metals Regional Sales Office, Southfield, Michigan 1959

Personal Work

- Cultural Center, Leopoldville, Belgian Congo, 1958
- Technical University, Ankara, Turkey 1959

Work Done while Faculty at The University of Michigan (Birkerts & Straub, Birkerts & Associates)

- Schwartz Summer Residence, Northville, Michigan 1960
- 1300 Lafayette East Cooperative Apartments, Detroit, Michigan 1961–1963
- Lillibridge Elementary School, Detroit, Michigan 1962–1963
- People's Federal Savings and Loan Branch, Royal Oak, Michigan 1962–1963
- Marathon Oil Office Building, Detroit, Michigan 1962–1964
- University Reformed Church, Ann Arbor, Michigan 1963–1964
- Detroit Institute of the Arts Master Plan and South Wing, Detroit, Michigan 1964
- Bald Mountain Recreation Facility, Lake Orion, Michigan 1964–1968
- Fisher Administrative Center at the University of Detroit-Mercy, Detroit, Michigan 1964–1966
- Travis Residence, Franklin, Michigan 1964–1965
- Tougaloo College Master Plan, Tougaloo, Mississippi 1965
- Tougaloo College Library and Dormitories, Tougaloo, Mississippi 1965–1972
- Lincoln Elementary School, Columbus, Indiana 1965–1967
- Freeman Residence, Grand Rapids, Michigan 1965–1966
- Massey Ferguson North American Operations Offices Project, Des Moines, Iowa Unbuilt, 1966
- Vocational Technical Institute Master Plan, Carbondale, Illinois Unbuilt, 1967
- Alfred Noble Branch Library, Livonia, Michigan, 1967
- Ford Pavilion at Hemisfair 1968, San Antonio, Texas 1967–1968
- Federal Reserve Bank of Minneapolis, Minneapolis, Minnesota 1967–1973
- Amsterdam City Hall Project, Amsterdam, Netherlands 1968
- Corning Public Library Project, Corning, New York Unbuilt, 1969
- Corning Public Library II Project, Corning, New York Unbuilt, 1969
- Duluth Public Library, Duluth, Minnesota 1969–1979
- IBM Corporate Computer Center, Sterling Forest, New York 1970–1972
- Contemporary Arts Museum, Houston, Texas 1970–1972
- Ford Visitors Reception Center, Dearborn, Michigan Unbuilt, 1971
- Dance Instructional Facility for SUNY Purchase, Purchase, New York 1971–1976
- General Motors Dual-Mode Transportation Study 1973–1974
- Corning Municipal Fire Station, Corning, New York 1973–1974
- Subterranean Urban-Systems Study, Graham Foundation Grant, 1974
- Calvary Baptist Church, Detroit, Michigan 1974–1977
- IBM Office Building, Southfield, Michigan 1974–1979
- University of Michigan Law Library Addition, Ann Arbor, Michigan 1974–1981
- United States Embassy, Helsinki, Finland Unbuilt, 1975
- Corning Museum of Glass, Corning, New York 1976–1980
- University of Iowa College of Law Building, Iowa City, Iowa 1979–1986
- Cathedral of the Most Blessed Sacrament Renovations, Detroit, Michigan Unbuilt Scheme, 1980
- Ferguson Residence (Villa Ginny), Kalamazoo, Michigan 1980–1983
- Uris Library Addition at Cornell University, Ithaca, New York 1980–1983
- St. Peter's Lutheran Church, Columbus, Indiana 1980–1988
- Anchorage Library, Anchorage, Alaska Unbuilt, 1981
- Baldwin Public Library Addition, Birmingham, Michigan 1981
- Minnesota State Capitol Expansion Project, St. Paul, Minnesota Unbuilt, 1983
- Holtzman and Silverman Office Building, Southfield, Michigan 1983–1989
- Minnesota History Center, Minneapolis, Minnesota Unbuilt, 1984
- Bardha Residence, Birmingham, Michigan 1984–1989
- Domino's Farms, Ann Arbor Township, Michigan 1984–1998
- Frances Willson Thompson Library at the University of Michigan-Flint, Flint, Michigan 1985-1994
- Oberlin College Conservatory of Music Library Addition, Oberlin, Ohio 1986–1988
- Schembechler Hall for the University of Michigan, Ann Arbor, Michigan 1986–1990
- Papal Altar and Furniture, Pontiac, Michigan 1987 (Now housed at the Cathedral of the Most Blessed Sacrament, Detroit)
- Novoli I, Florence, Italy Unbuilt, 1987
- Domino's Tower, Ann Arbor, Michigan Unbuilt, 1987–1988
- UC-San Diego Library Addition, San Diego, California 1987–1993
- Ohio State University Law School Addition, Columbus, Ohio 1988–1993
- Church of the Servant, Kentwood, Michigan 1988–1994
- Torino I, Turin, Italy Unbuilt, 1989
- Torino II, Turin, Italy Unbuilt, 1989–1990
- Marge Monaghan House, Drummond Island, Michigan 1989–1990
- Sports and Civic Stadium, Venice, Italy Unbuilt, 1989–1992
- United States Embassy, Caracas, Venezuela 1989–1996
- National Library of Latvia, Riga, Latvia 1989–2014

Professor Emeritus at the University of Michigan

- Grasis Residence, Vail, Colorado 1990–1994
- Kemper Museum of Contemporary Art, Kansas City, Missouri 1991–1994
- Marriott Library Addition at the University of Utah, Salt Lake City, Utah 1992–1996
- Novoli II, Florence, Italy Unbuilt, 1993
- Juma Al-Majid Center for Culture and Heritage, Dubai, United Arab Emirates Unbuilt, 1993
- Riga Central Market Restoration and Expansion, Riga, Latvia Unbuilt, 1995
- Cellular Communications Tower at Domino's Farms, Ann Arbor, Michigan 1995
- Cathedral of the Most Blessed Sacrament, Detroit, Michigan 1998–2003
- Dr. Martin Luther King Jr. Public Library, San Jose, California 1998–2004
- Kellogg Library at California State-San Marcos, San Marcos, California 2000–2004
- The Museum of the Occupation of Latvia, Riga, Latvia 2002–

== Publications ==
- Birkerts, Gunnar, Gunnar Birkerts – Metaphoric Modernist, Axel Menges, Stuttgart, Germany 2009; ISBN 978-3-936681-26-0
- Birkerts, Gunnar, Process and Expression in Architectural Form, University of Oklahoma Press, Norman OK 1994; ISBN 0-8061-2642-6
- Birkerts, Gunnar, Subterranean Urban Systems, Industrial Development Division-Institute of Science and Technology, University of Michigan 1974
- Kaiser, Kay, The Architecture of Gunnar Birkerts, American Institute of Architects Press, Washington DC 1989; ISBN 1-55835-051-9
- Martin, William, Gunnar Birkerts and Associates (Yukio Futagawa, editor and photographer), A.D.A. Edita (GA Architect), Tokyo 1982
- Gunnar Birkerts & Associates, IBM Information Systems Center, Sterling Forest, N.Y., 1972; Federal Reserve Bank of Minneapolis, Minnesota, 1973 (Yukio Futagawa, editor and photographer), A.D.A. EDITA (GA Architecture), Tokyo 1974
