= Lafayette Towers Apartments West =

Apartment building in Detroit, Michigan

Coordinates: 42.3402°N 83.0330°W

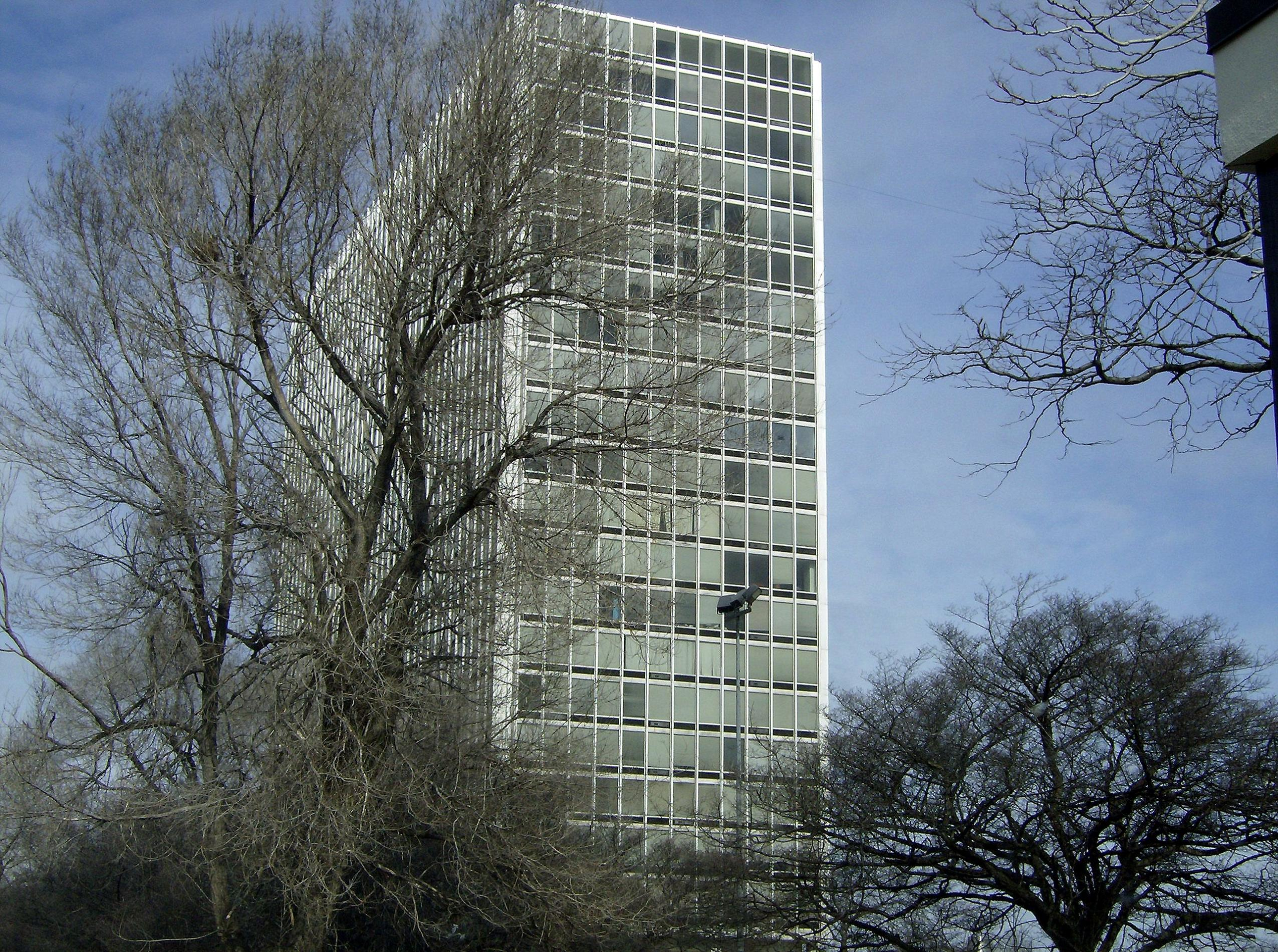
Lafayette Towers Apartments West.

Lafayette Towers Apartments West is at 1321 Orleans Street in the Lafayette Park development near downtown Detroit, Michigan. It is one of two identical apartment buildings designed by Ludwig Mies van der Rohe; the other is Lafayette Towers Apartments East. Both the Lafayette Towers Apartments were built in 1963 and stand at 22 stories in height. They were designed in the International style of architecture, much like the Lafayette Pavilion Apartments, and the other buildings in the development. The primary materials for the facades are aluminium and glass.

== Lafayette Park development ==
This is of four towers in the Lafayette Park development. The others are the Windsor Tower, the Lafayette Pavilion Apartments, and Lafayette Towers Apartments West.

Along with the other neighboring Mies van der Rohe-designed buildings in the Lafayette Park development, these buildings were added to the National Register of Historic Places in 1996.
