= University Towers =

Condominium building in Ann Arbor, Michigan, US

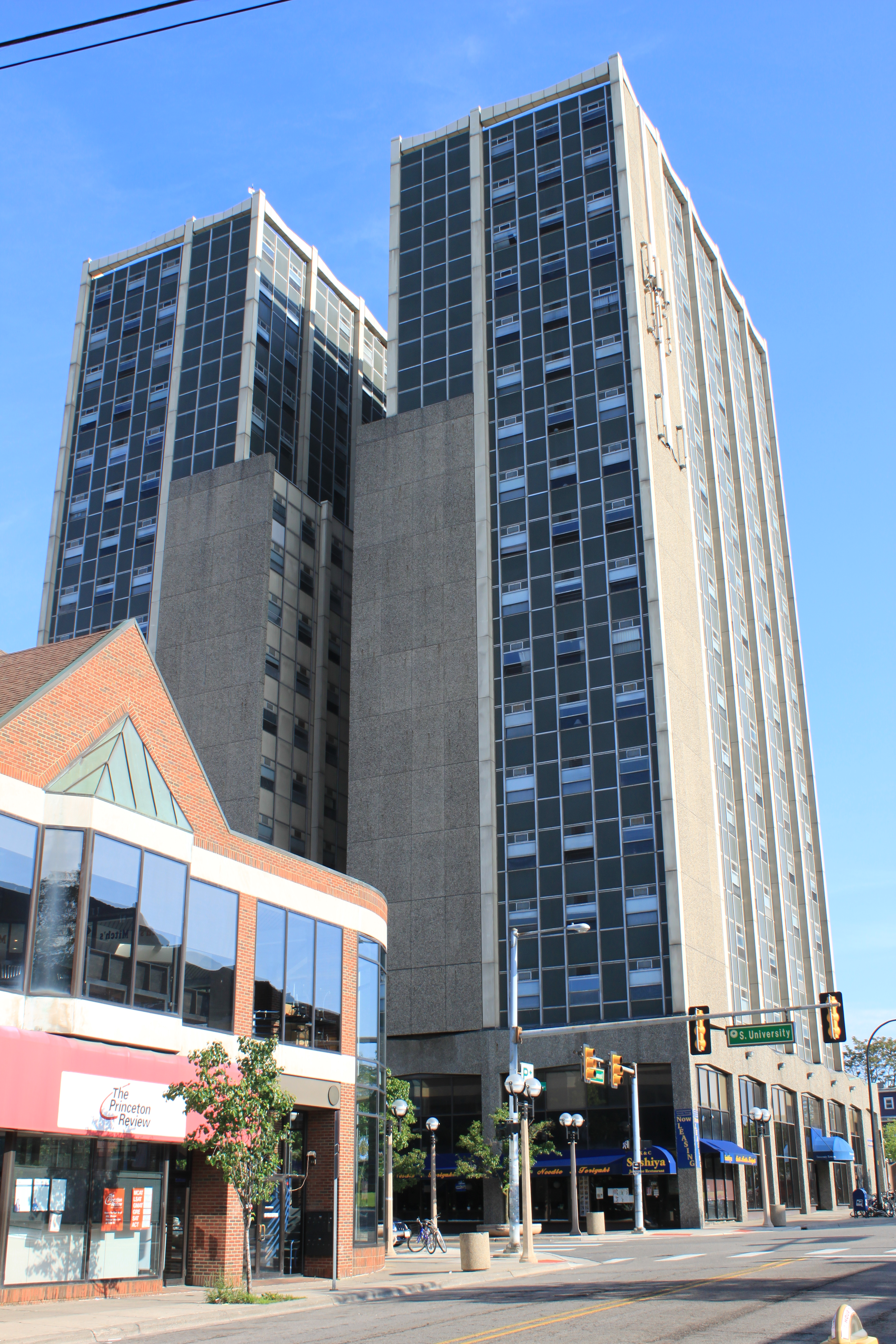
- University Towers facing S. University
- Interactive map of the University Towers area

General information
- Type: Residential
- Location: 536 South Forest Avenue, Ann Arbor, Michigan, United States of America
- Coordinates: 42°16′31″N 83°43′59″W
- Construction started: September 1964
- Opened: August 21, 1965
- Cost: $5 million

Technical details
- Floor count: 18

Other information
- Number of units: 240

Website
- u-towers.com

University Towers is a residential apartment building in Ann Arbor, Michigan. The building was constructed in 1965 and stands at 19 floors, with 240 units/rooms. The high-rise also contains a fitness center. At the time of construction, it was the tallest building in Washtenaw County and second tallest structure, behind Burton Memorial Tower.

It was designed in the international architectural style, using concrete and glass as its main materials.

University Towers started a major renovation project in 2014–2015. Improvements to the lobby, amenities, resident apartments and services have been modernized. Also, for reasons that remain unknown, the 13th floor of the building was removed. The total project completion is estimated for the summer of 2016.

== Amenities ==
- Outdoor pool
- Fitness center
- Coffee lounge
- Laundry
- 24 hour desk attendants
- Complimentary Internet, cable, heat
- WiFi study lounge

=== Second-floor apartments ===
In 2012, University Towers renovated its second floor into separate luxury apartments. A new entrance was created for residents of the second floor, which can be accessed on South University St.

== Gallery ==
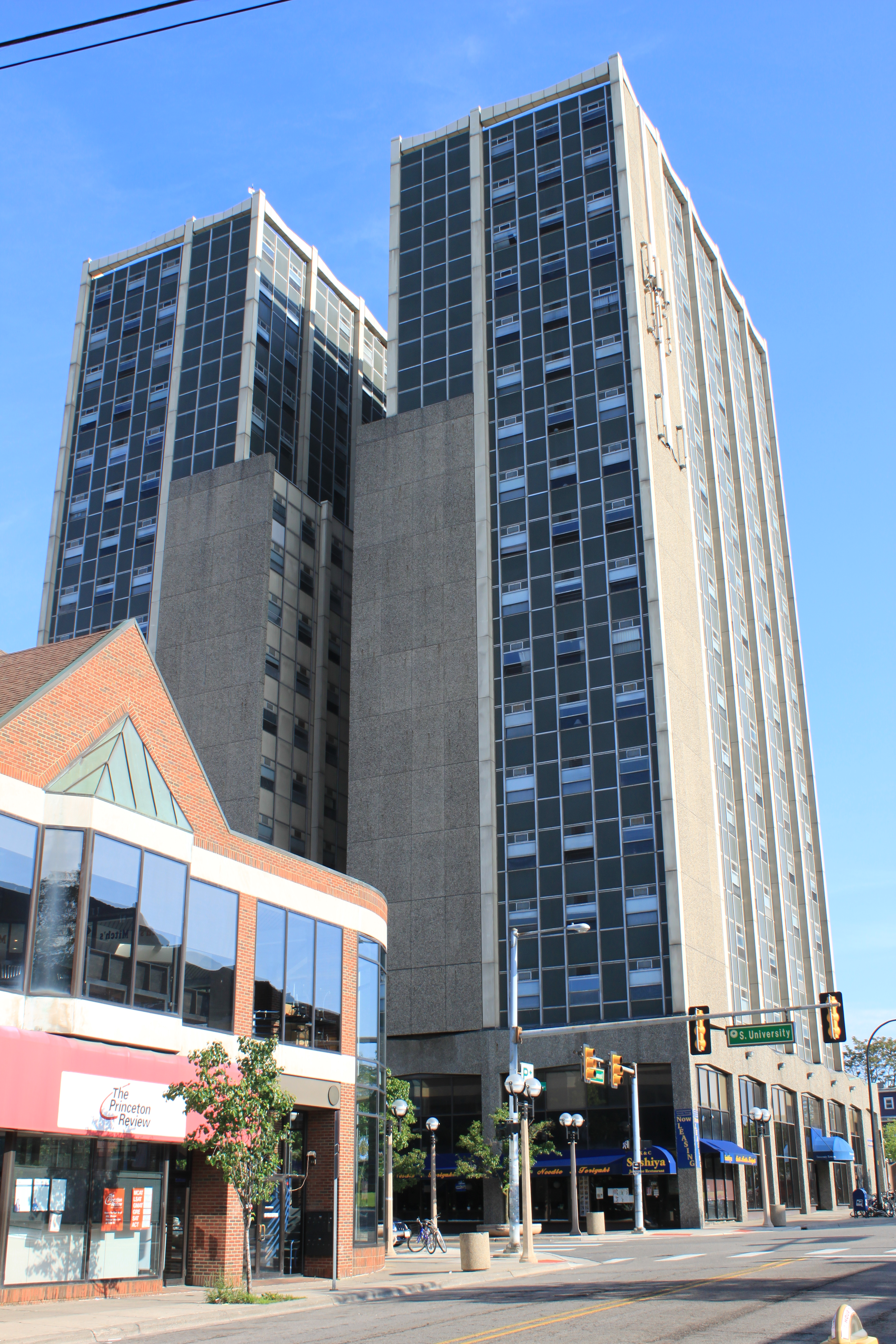
University Towers facing S. University

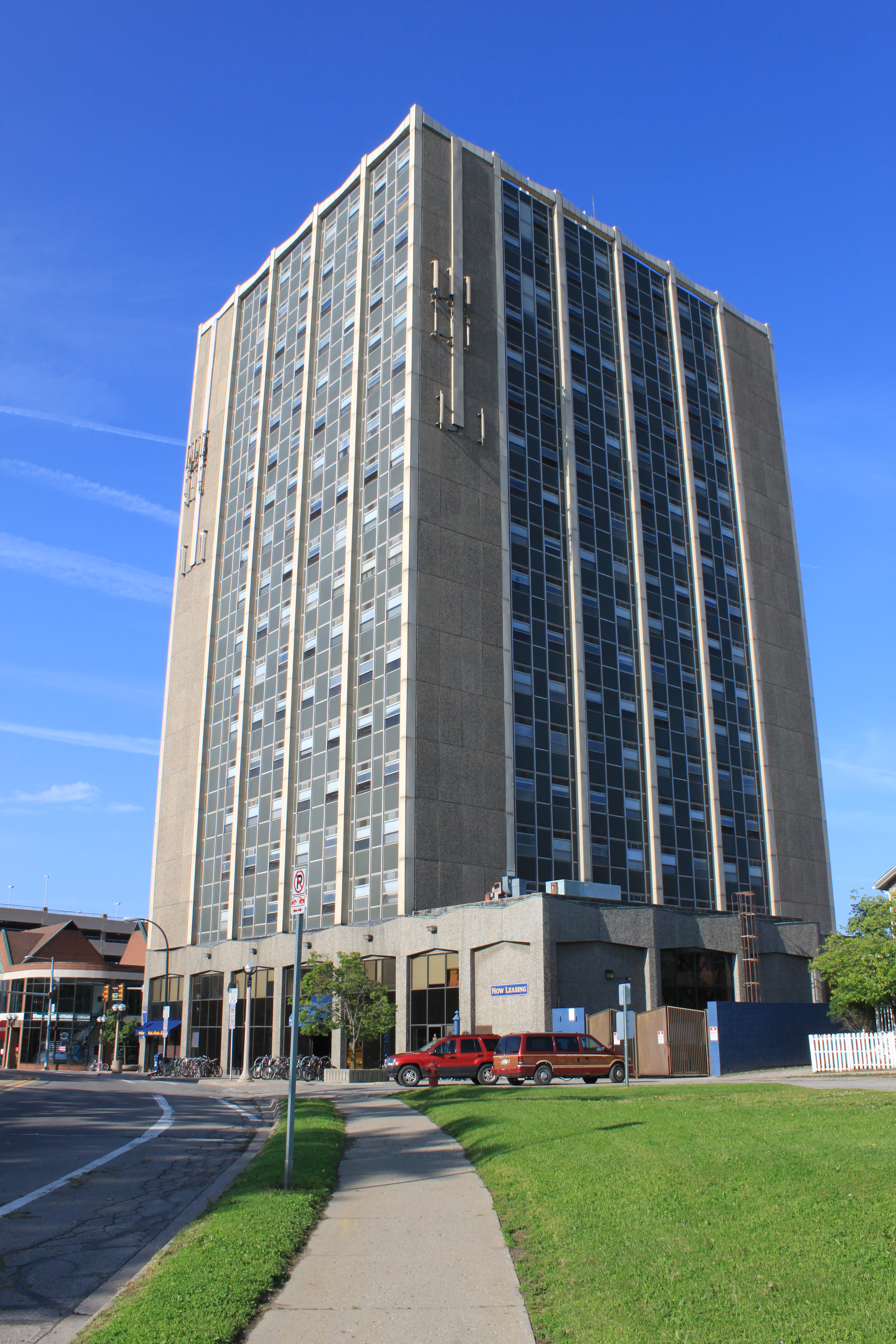
University Towers facing S. Forest
