= List of neighborhoods in Detroit =

Neighborhoods in Detroit
- Commercial, cultural, and residential
- Interactive map of Neighborhoods in Detroit
- Coordinates: 42°20′02″N 83°02′52″W
- Country: United States of America
- State: Michigan
- County: Wayne
- City: Detroit

Area
  - Land: 138.8 sq mi (359 km^{2})

Population (2010)
  - Total: 713,777
  - Density: 5,142/sq mi (1,986/km^{2})
- Time zone: UTC-5 (EST)
  - Summer (DST): UTC-4 (EDT)
- Area code: 313

This list of neighborhoods in Detroit, the United States, provides a general overview of neighborhoods and historic districts within the city. Neighborhood names and boundaries vary in their formality; some are well defined and long established, while others are more informal. Further names and boundaries have evolved over time due to development or changes in demographics. Woodward Avenue, a major a north–south thoroughfare, serves as a demarcation for neighborhood areas on the east side and west side of the city.

== Map ==
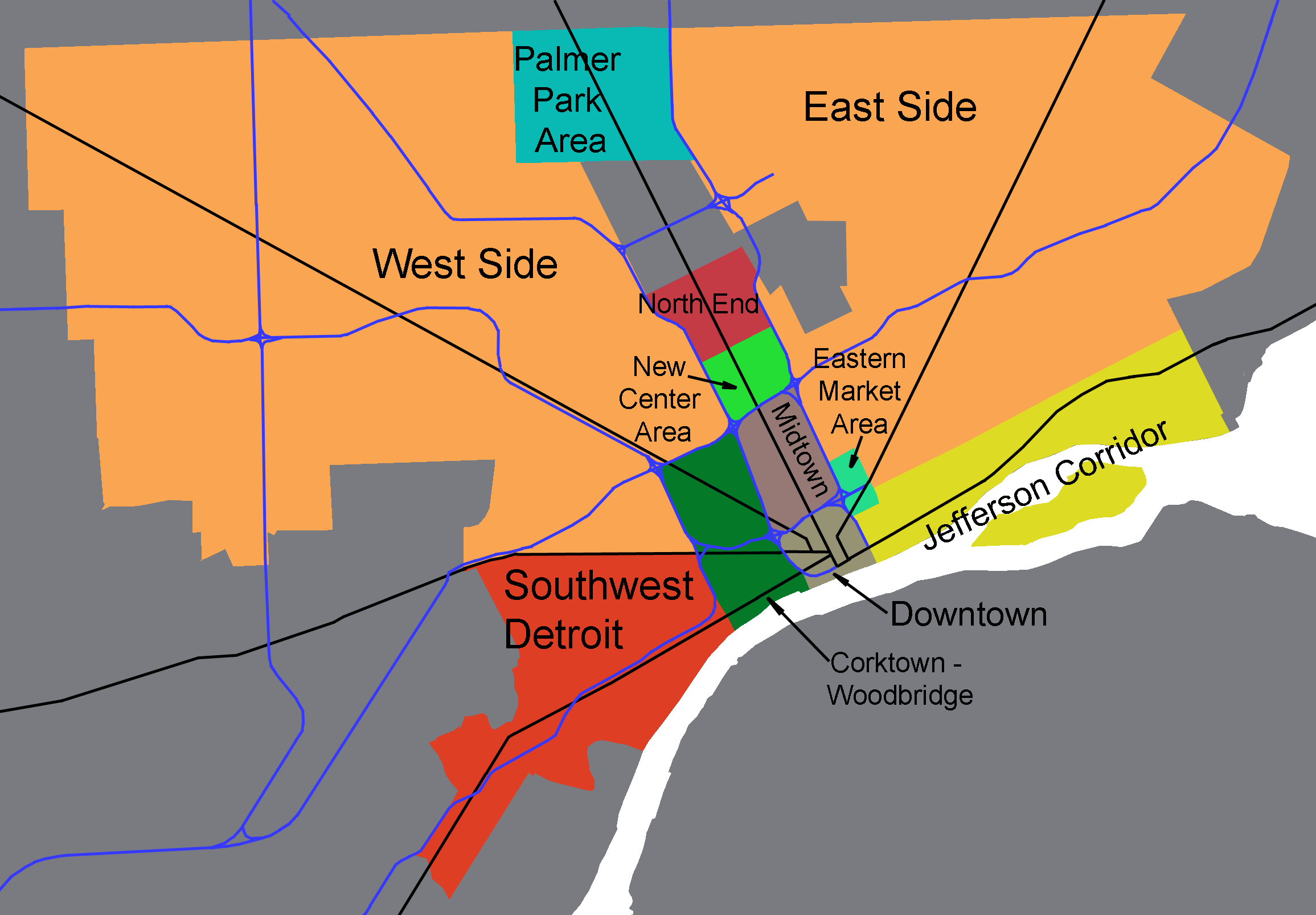
Areas of the City of Detroit. The grayed-out enclaves are Highland Park to the west, and Hamtramck to the east.

== Areas and neighborhoods ==
=== Downtown ===
Downtown Detroit is the city's central business district and a residential area, bordered by M-10 (Lodge Freeway) to the west, the Interstate 75 (I-75, Fisher Freeway) to the north, I-375 (Chrysler Freeway) to the east, and the Detroit River to the south. The area contains many of the prominent skyscrapers in Detroit, including the Renaissance Center, the Penobscot Building, and the Guardian Building. The downtown area features high-rise residential living along with a number of parks including those linked by a promenade along the International Riverfront. Downtown Detroit was named among the best big city neighborhoods in which to retire by CNN Money Magazine editors.

The Detroit Opera House is located at Broadway and Grand Circus. The "east necklace" of Downtown links Grand Circus and the stadium area to Greektown along Broadway. The east necklace contains a sub-district sometimes called the Harmonie Park District, which has taken on the renowned legacy of Detroit's music from 1930s through the 1950s to the present. Near the Opera House and emanating from Grand Circus along the east necklace are other venues including the Music Hall Center for the Performing Arts and the Gem Theatre and Century Club. The historic Harmonie Club and Harmonie Centre are located along Broadway. The Harmonie Park area ends near Gratiot and Randolph. The Detroit Athletic Club stands in view of center field at Comerica Park. Part of the east necklace, the area contains architecturally notable buildings planned for renovation as high-rise residential condominiums such as the Gothic Revival Metropolitan Building at 33 John R St. The Hilton Garden Inn is also in the Harmonie Park area. The east necklace area is serviced by the People Mover at Cadillac station and Broadway station.

Greektown is located less than half a mile (800 m) from the Renaissance Center in the downtown area. The neighborhood is a popular restaurant and entertainment district, having many restaurants that serve Greek cuisine, as well as Hollywood Casino, one of three casino resorts in the city. Certain buildings on Monroe Street are themed to resemble the Parthenon, Pegasus, and other forms of Greek architecture. Greek music is also played on Monroe Street throughout the day. St. Mary Roman Catholic Church, founded by German immigrants, is located in the heart of the district. The Second Baptist Church once served as "station" for the Underground Railroad. The Detroit People Mover has a station at the Hollywood Casino on Beaubien Street between Monroe Street and Lafayette Boulevard.

Name	Image	Location	Summary
Bricktown Historic District		Separates the Renaissance Center from Greektown.	Bricktown separates the Renaissance Center from Greektown. Bricktown is home to St. Peter and Paul's Catholic Church, the oldest standing church in Detroit, and the Italian Renaissance style Wayne County Building (which was saved from demolition in the early 1980s). The Wayne County Courthouse, once located in the Wayne County Building, was the place where Mae West was once a defendant on a charge of public indecency. Bricktown is known for its live music venues. Jacoby's German Biergarten (1904), the city's oldest surviving pub, provides a small performance space for up & coming acts. St. Andrew's Hall is a venue for national touring acts, as is the Shelter in the basement of St. Andrew's.
Broadway Avenue Historic District		Broadway between Gratiot and Grand River Boulevard; 42°20′6″N 83°2′46″W	The Broadway Avenue Historic District is located along a single block of Broadway Avenue, and contains eleven commercial buildings built between 1896 and 1926. The area was developed in the late 19th century as a commercial area catering to the women's trade, and included businesses such as hairdressers, florists, corset makers, and fashionable clothiers. Three buildings in the district — the Cary Building, Harmonie Centre, and the Merchants Building — are individually listed on the NRHP.
Campus Martius Park		42°19′53″N 83°2′48″W Woodward Ave.	Campus Martius is a historic district and central gathering place which contains parks, Woodward Fountain, the Michigan Soldiers' and Sailors' Monument, and a large traffic circle surrounded by commercial and residential high-rises including 1001 Woodward Avenue. Since the traffic circles restoration and expansion, it has emerged as a central gathering spot downtown with a mainstage.
Capitol Park Historic District		Roughly bounded by Grand River Ave., Woodward Ave., Michigan Ave., and Washington Boulevard; 42°19′58″N 83°2′58″W	Capitol Park itself is a triangular plot of land (now a public park) bounded by Shelby Street, Griswold Street, and State Street. A courthouse was built in Capitol Park in 1823–28; when Michigan became a state in 1837, the building served as the state capitol. The Historic District includes the park and seventeen surrounding buildings for a block in each direction, including the Farwell Building, the Griswold Building, the David Stott Building, and the Industrial-Stevens Apartments.
Detroit Financial District		Bounded by Woodward and Jefferson and Lafayette and Washington Boulevard; 42°19′46.36″N 83°2′50.43″W	This is the historic financial district of Detroit which dates to the 1850s and contains prominent skyscrapers. Ornate skyscrapers in Detroit (including the Guardian Building, the Penobscot Building, and One Woodward Avenue), reflecting two waves of large-scale redevelopment: the first in 1900–1930 and the second in the 1950s and early 1960s.
Grand Circus Park Historic District		Roughly bounded by Clifford, John R. and Adams Sts.; also 25 W. Elizabeth; 42°20′10″N 83°3′2″W	Grand Circus Park Historic District contains the 5-acre (2.0 ha) Grand Circus Park, bisected by Woodward Avenue. Noted buildings encircling the park include the David Broderick Tower and David Whitney Building on the south, the Kales Building, and the First Methodist Church on the north. Comerica Park and the Detroit Opera House on the East. 25 W. Elizabeth was a boundary increase added in 2000.
Greektown		Monroe Ave., between Brush and St. Antoine Sts. 42°20′6″N 83°2′32″W	Greektown is a primarily commercial district that extends two city blocks. It includes St. Mary Roman Catholic Church, Second Baptist Church, separately listed on the Register, Hollywood Casino, and the Athenium Suite Hotel. The district contains numerous restaurants and Greek-themed shops.
Jefferson Avenue			Jefferson Avenue runs parallel to downtown along the International Riverfront which contains the Renaissance Center, TCF Center, a cruise ship terminal and dock, residential high rises, and a prominade of parks and marinas extending to Belle Isle. The towering Riverfront Condominiums are among the high-rise residential areas along the riverfront. The University of Detroit Mercy College of Law is across from the Renaissance Center along Jefferson Avenue. The People Mover serves the Renaissance Center and the TCF Center along the riverfront.
Lower Woodward Avenue Historic District		1202–1449 and 1400–1456 Woodward Ave. 42°20′3″N 83°2′56″W	The Lower Woodward Avenue Historic District contains thirty-four commercial buildings built at the end of the 19th century and the beginning of the twentieth, many by noted architects. It contains the downtown's historic street-side shopping district.
Monroe Avenue Commercial Buildings		16-118 Monroe Ave. 42°19′58″N 83°2′45″W	The National Theatre (1911) at 118 Monroe Ave., the oldest surviving theatre in Detroit, is a part of the city's original theatre district from the late 19th century. Albert Kahn designed the theatre.
Park Avenue Historic District		Park Ave., between W. Adams Ave. and W. Fisher Freeway; 42°20′12″N 83°3′49″W	In the 1920s, Detroit's prestigious Grand Circus Park was crowded with buildings and development began to spill north from Grand Circus Park up Park Avenue. In 1923, the Park Avenue Association was formed. They planned the street to concentrate high-grade commercial and office space at the south end, and prestigious residential development at the north end, much like New York City's Fifth Avenue. The district includes the Women's City Club, the Royal Palms Hotel, and the Kales Building.
Randolph Street Commercial Buildings Historic District		1208–1244 Randolph St. 42°20′4″N 83°2′42″W	Buildings along this section of Randolph Street have been used for retail since the area was first built up in the 1840s; the building at 1244 Randolph was built during the period of original construction. As the city grew, larger commercial buildings were required and the other structures on Randolph were constructed.
Washington Boulevard Historic District		Washington Boulevard, between State and Clifford Sts. 42°19′59″N 83°3′4″W	This district includes the Book-Cadillac Hotel, the Book Tower, the Industrial-Stevens Apartments, and Washington Square (Trolley Plaza) among other architecturally significant buildings. The Detroit Statler Hotel was located on the boulevard until it was demolished in 2005. The street was broadened and ornamented in the early part of the 20th century to resemble New York's Fifth Avenue and European boulevards.

=== Midtown ===
Midtown Detroit is an area covering roughly two square miles between Downtown Detroit to the south and New Center to the north along Woodward Avenue. Its boundaries are the Ford, Chrysler, Fisher, and Lodge Freeways. It includes the Art Center and the Medical Center in the northeast quadrant, most of Wayne State University's campus, the Detroit Public Library, and the Detroit Historical Museum in the northwest, and the Cultural Center including various restaurants, galleries, newly constructed lofts/condos and nightlife venues along Woodward in the center, among other things. While the academic core of the Wayne State campus is entirely within Midtown, the campus has expanded outside the boundaries stated here. The academic campus also includes a small area north of the Ford Freeway in New Center; the school's athletic facilities are west of the Lodge Freeway and can be considered part of either Midtown or the adjacent Woodbridge neighborhood.

Art Center two Miles (3 km) north of downtown, is centered on the Cultural Center Historic District, which is listed in the National Register of Historic Places. The Cultural Center is roughly bounded by Cass Avenue to the west, I-75 to the east, I-94 to the north and Warren Avenue to the south. It also includes the East Ferry Avenue Historic District. Attractions include the Detroit Institute of Arts, the Charles H. Wright Museum of African American History, the Scarab Club, the Detroit Historical Museum, the Museum of Contemporary Art Detroit, the main library of the Detroit Public Library system and the Detroit Science Center. The College for Creative Studies is located adjacent the Scarab Club and opposite the East face of the Detroit Institute of Arts. The main campus of Wayne State University is located adjacent to the area, on the opposite side of Woodward.

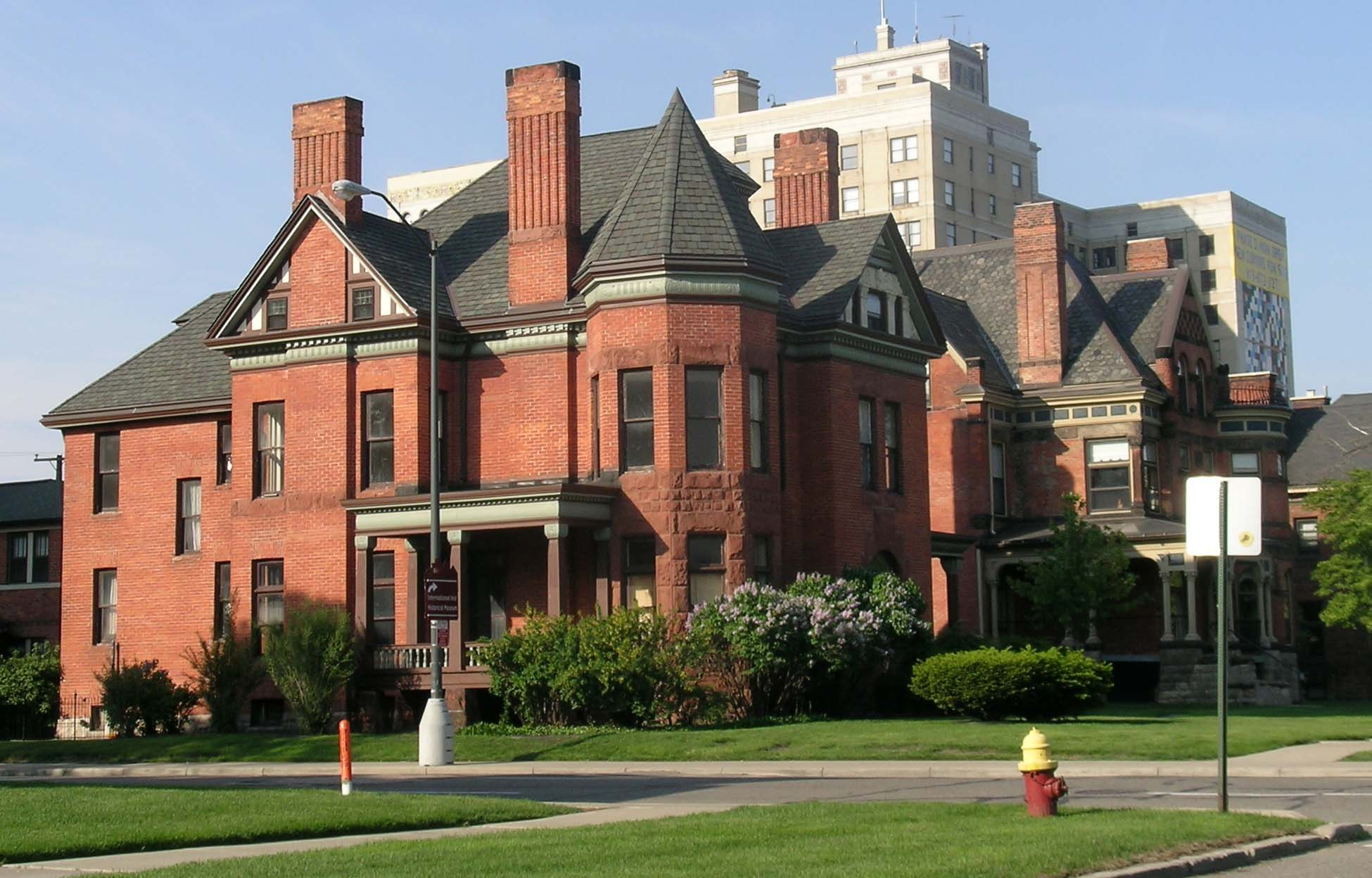
Restored Victorian homes on East Ferry Avenue

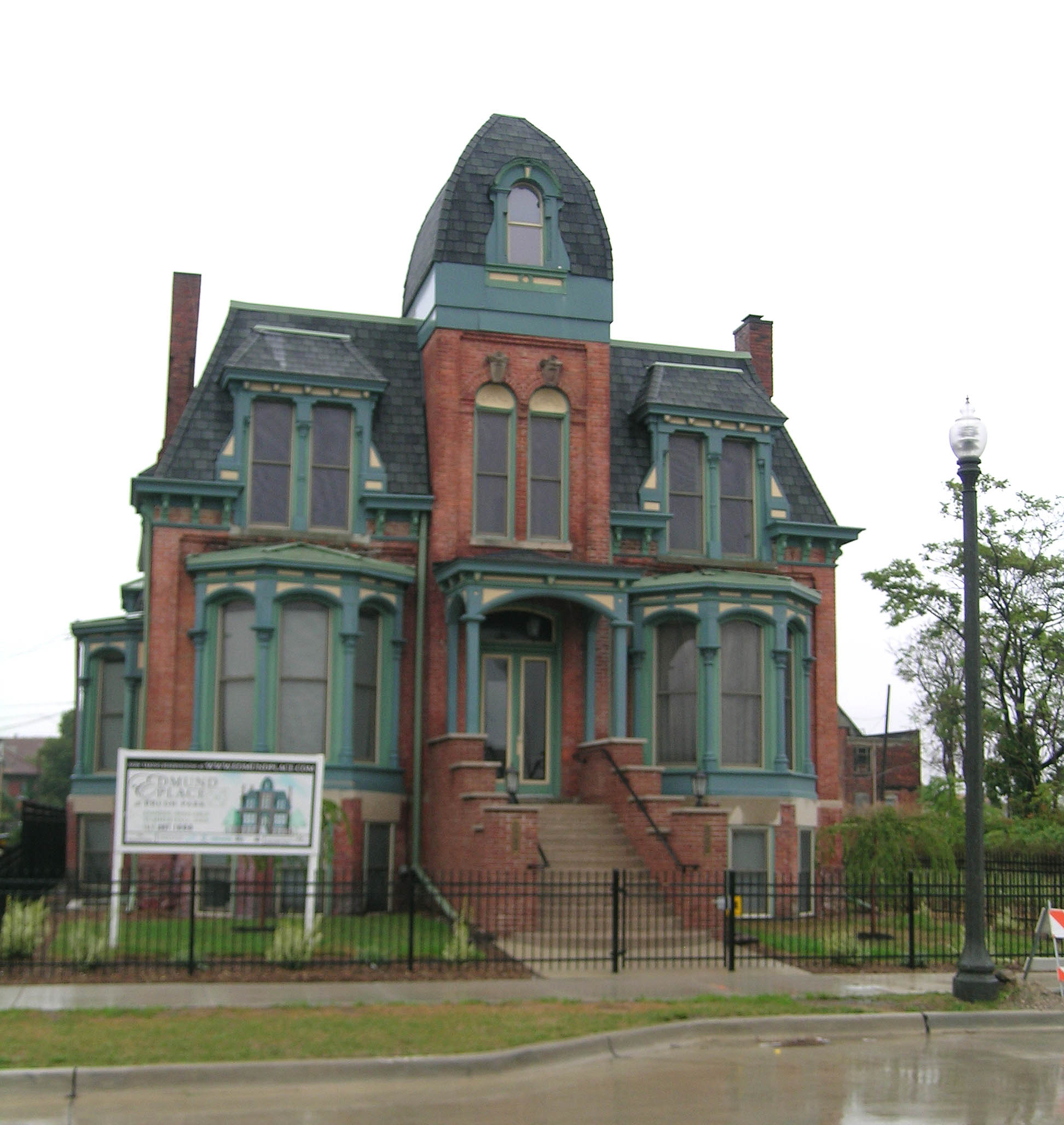
Frederick Butler House in Brush Park

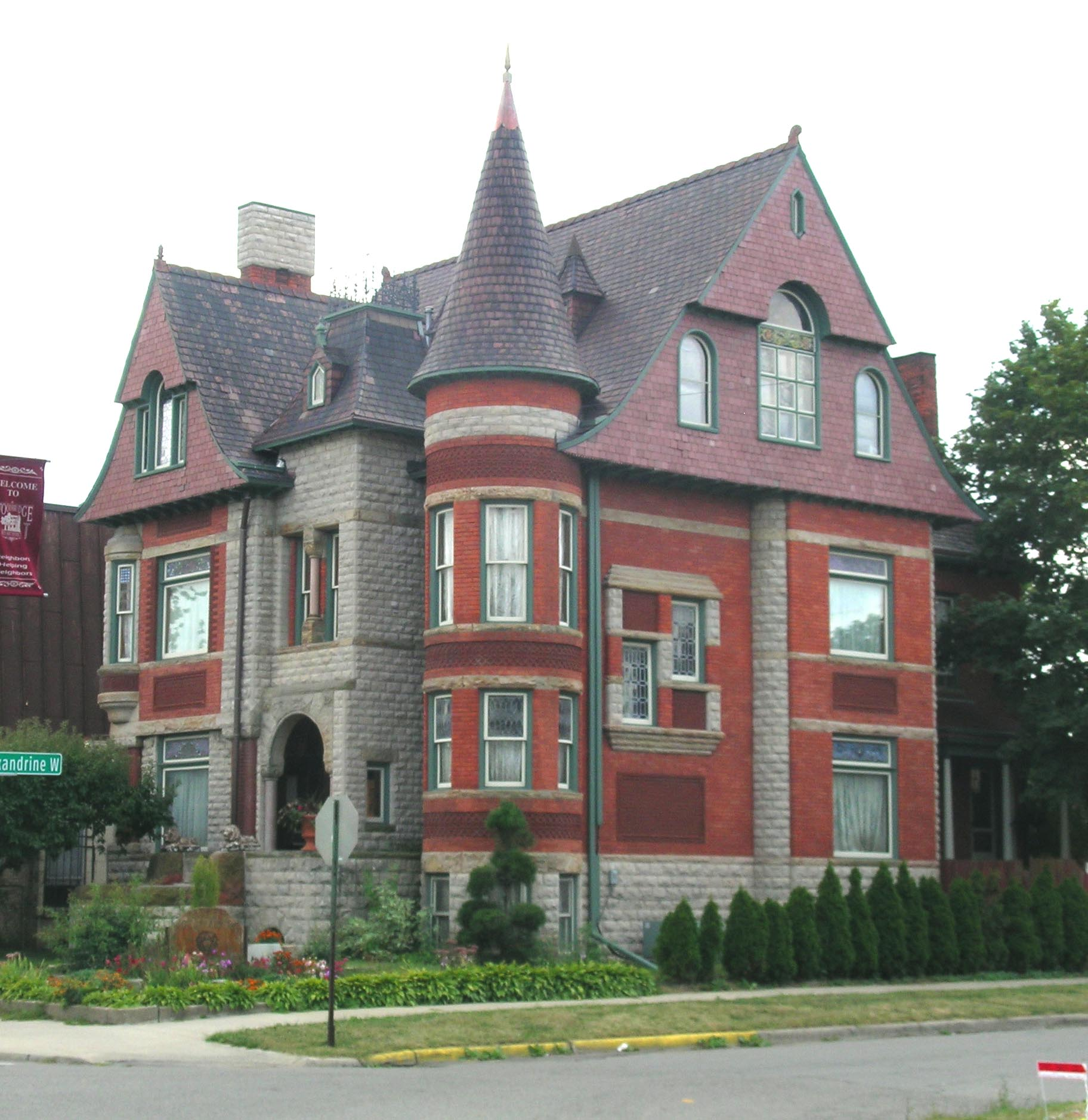
Hunter House in Woodbridge

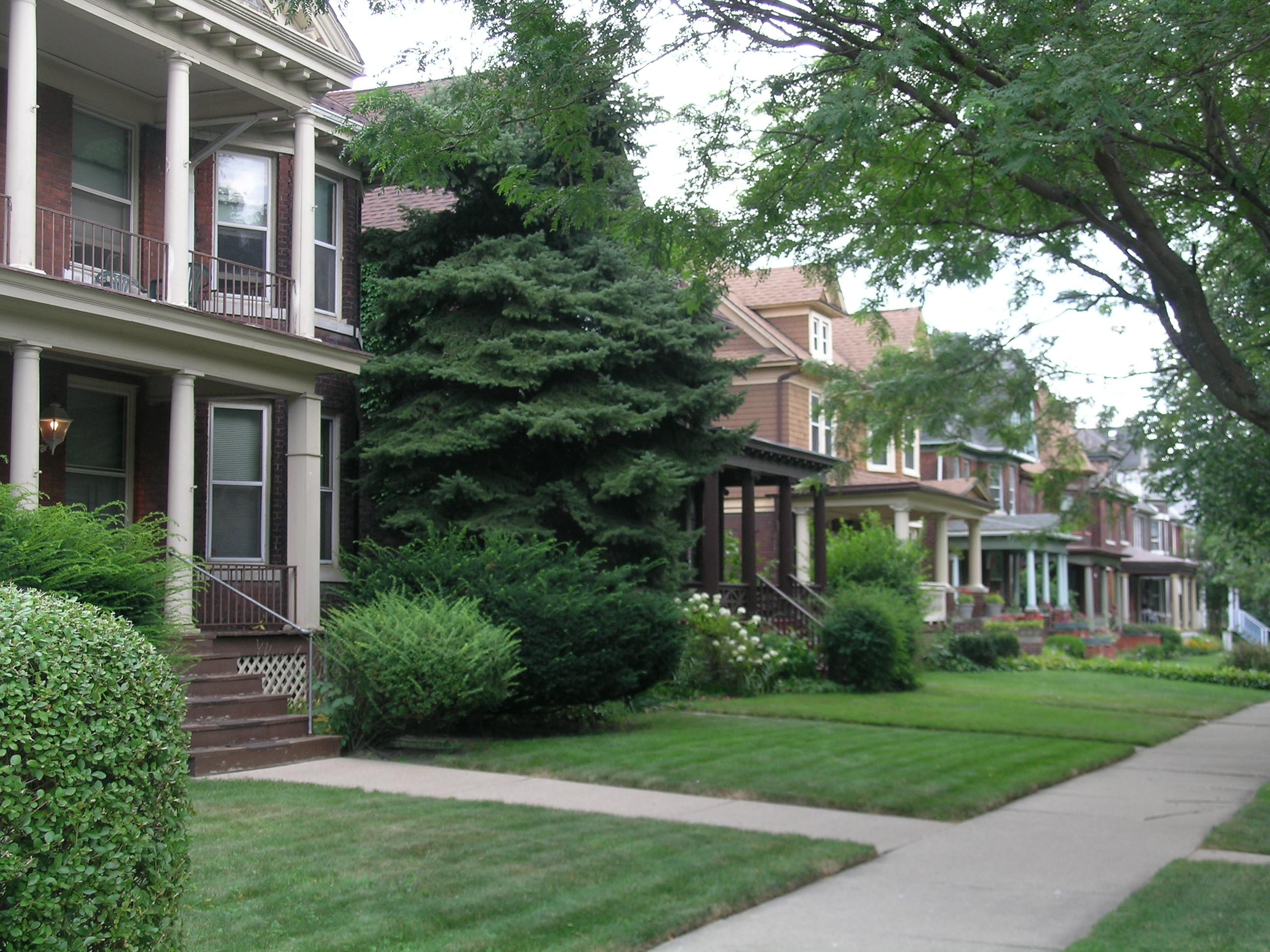
Homes on Avery in Woodbridge

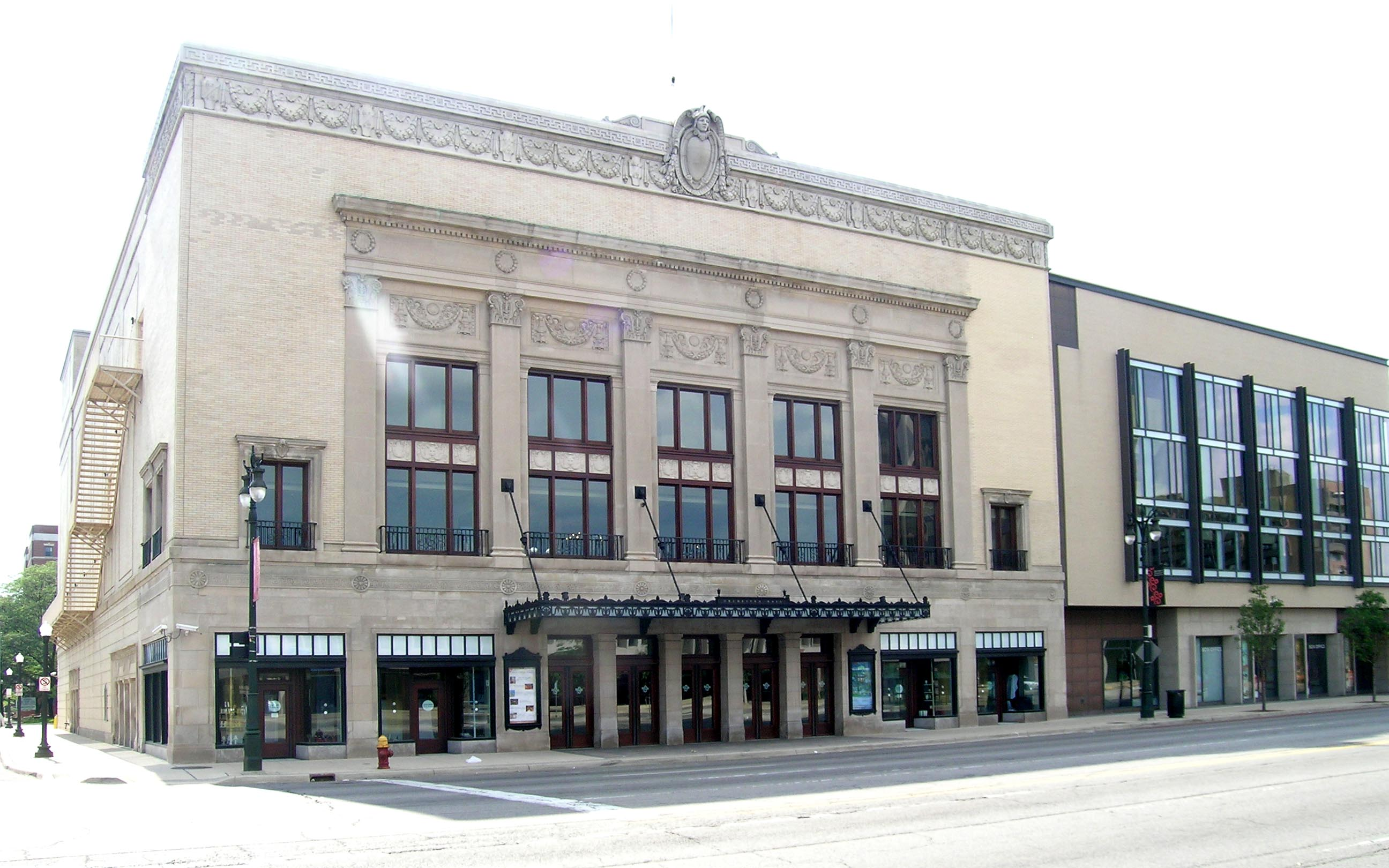
Orchestra Hall on Woodward Avenue

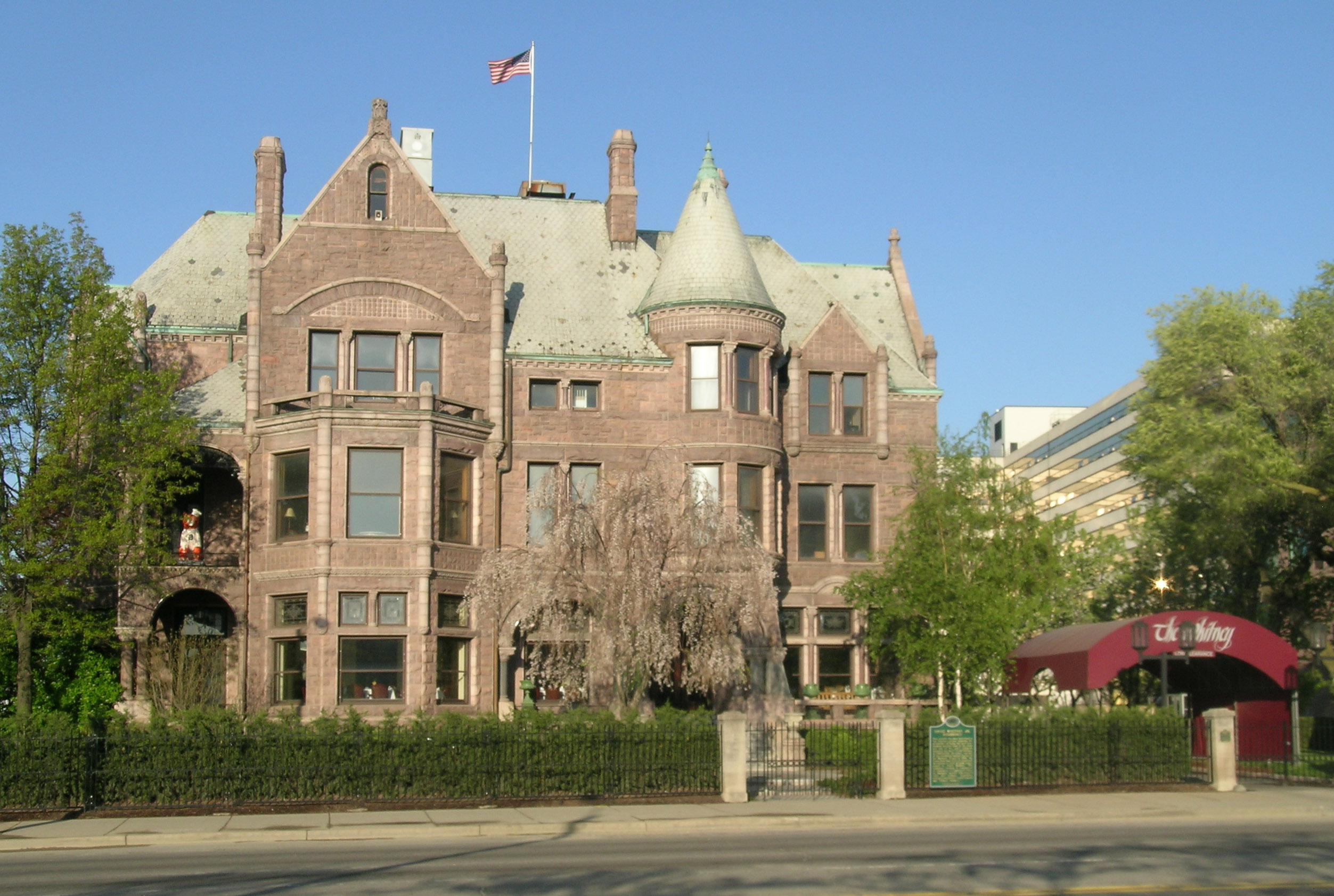
David Whitney House on Woodward Avenue

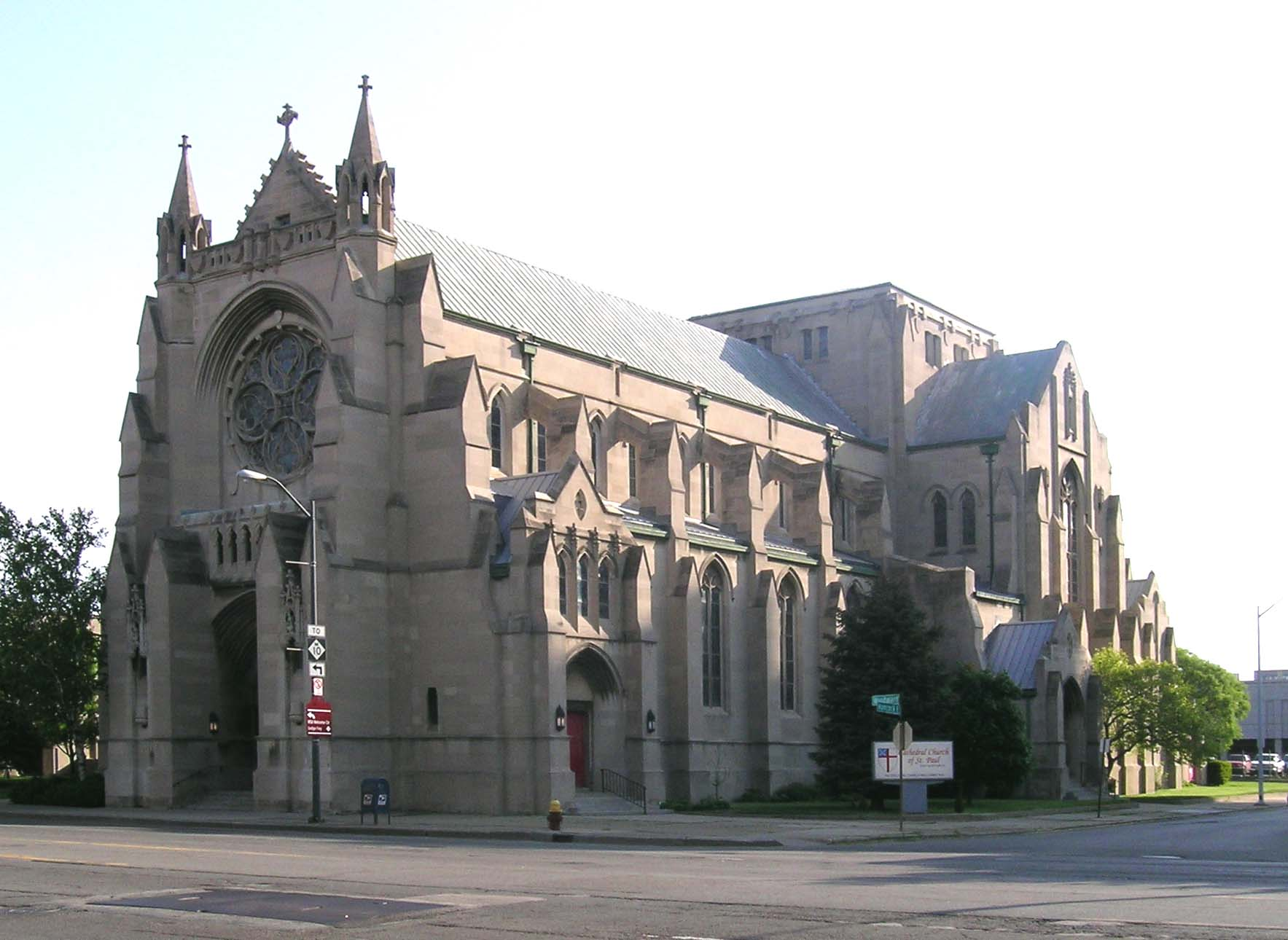
Cathedral Church of St. Paul on Woodward Avenue

Name	Image	Location	Summary
Brush Park / Woodward East		Bounded by Alfred, Edmund, Watson, Brush and John R. Sts. 42°20′43″N 83°3′9″W	Brush Park is the 22 block area bounded by Mack on the north, Woodward on the west, Beaubien on the east, and the Fisher Freeway on the south. This neighborhood is within the larger area known as Midtown. The Woodward East Historic District, located within the locally designated Brush Park historic district, is particularly known for the High Victorian style residences constructed for Detroit's wealthiest citizens. Although many of the once-grand houses have been demolished, the 21st century has seen many of the remaining homes restored.
Cass Corridor		The Cass Corridor is bounded by Woodward Ave. to the East, West Grand Blvd. to the North, the John C. Lodge Freeway to the West, and the Fisher Freeway serves as its southern terminus in Downtown Detroit.	Originally home to some of Detroit's wealthiest residents from the late 19th to mid-20th century, it developed as the hub of urban arts and culture in Detroit. Wayne State University expanded in the area to encompass much of the original Cass Corridor.
Cass Park Historic District		Temple, Ledyard, and 2nd at Cass Park; 42°20′28″N 83°3′35″W	This historic district surrounds Cass Park itself, and contains over 20 buildings including apartments, a hotel, the Detroit Masonic Temple, the S. S. Kresge World Headquarters, and Cass Technical High School.
Cass-Davenport Historic District		Roughly bounded Cass Ave., Davenport, and Martin Luther King Jr. Boulevard; 42°20′46″N 83°3′40″W	The Cass-Davenport Historic District includes four apartment buildings near the corner of Cass Avenue and Martin Luther King Boulevard. Two are typical of the small scale, luxurious apartment buildings built in Detroit near the turn of the 20th century and two are typical of the large scale, high density apartment buildings constructed between 1915 and 1930.
Cultural Center Historic District		5200, 5201 Woodward Ave., and 100 Farnsworth Ave. 42°21′31″N 83°3′57″W	Woodward Avenue passes through the Cultural Center Historic District which includes: the Detroit Public Library, the Detroit Institute of Arts, and the Horace H. Rackham Education Memorial Building.
East Ferry Avenue Historic District		E. Ferry Ave. 42°21′42″N 83°3′56″W	In the mid-1880s, D. M. Ferry platted his seed farm near Woodward into residential lots. East Ferry Avenue was quickly settled by prosperous middle and upper middle class Detroit residents. Although Woodward Avenue has since been redeveloped into primarily commercial property, the mansions and upscale housing on East Ferry survives. The district includes the separately-designated Col. Frank J. Hecker House and the Charles Lang Freer House.
Midtown Woodward Historic District		2951-3424 Woodward Ave., 14 Charlotte St., 10 and 25 PeterboroSt. 42°20′43.5″N 83°3′23.5″W	The Midtown Woodward Historic District spans two blocks along Woodward Avenue, and contains three Albert Kahn-designed structures—the Addison Hotel, Kahn Print Shop, and the Temple Beth-El—in addition to the C. Howard Crane-designed Fine Arts Theatre.
Sugar Hill Historic District		East Forest, Garfield, and East Canfield, between Woodward Avenue on the west and John R. on the east.	An art gallery is located on Forest Ave. On Canfield, one historic properties was recently refurbished into luxury loft condos and office space.
University–Cultural Center		Bounded by the Chrysler Freeway (I-75) on the east, the Lodge Freeway (M-10) on the west, the Grand Trunk Railroad tracks on the north, and Selden Street, Parsons Street, East Willis Street, and East Warren Avenue on the south.42°21′35″N 83°4′9″W	Structures in this Multiple Resource Area are located within Midtown. The section of the University–Cultural Center just beyond Midtown contains the New Amsterdam Historic District and the Piquette Avenue Industrial Historic District.
Warren-Prentis Historic District		Bounded by Woodward, Warren, 3rd, and the alley south of Prentis; 42°21′15″N 83°4′4″W	This district contains a mix of building styles. Upper-class Detroit citizens built single-family homes in the area in 1880–1895. During the same time, apartment living became more popular, and duplexes and small apartment buildings were constructed in the 1890s through the first part of the 20th century. Commercial development was added to the mix in the years after World War I.
Wayne State University		4735-4841 Cass Ave. 42°21′16″N 83°4′2″W	Wayne State is a large university in the heart of Midtown. The Detroit Medical Center and many notable buildings are in the area, including the Queen Anne style WSU Mackenzie House, the Hilberry Theater, and Old Main.
West Canfield Historic District		Canfield Ave. between 2nd and 3rd Sts.; also 3rd Ave. between Canfield and Calumet; 42°21′3″N 83°4′4″W	The West Canfield Historic district is located on a primarily residential block of Canfield. Homes in the district are examples of Queen Anne architecture that have remained nearly unchanged since the late 19th century. A boundary increase (added 1997-09-22) added buildings on Third Avenue between Canfield and Calumet to the district.
Willis-Selden Historic District		Bounded by the alley north of W. Willis, Woodward, the alley south of Selden, and 3rd Ave. 42°20′57″N 83°3′52″W	The Willis-Selden Historic District includes a large number of commercial buildings and high-density apartment buildings built in the early 20th century to service Detroit's booming auto economy.
Woodbridge		Bounded by Trumbull, Calumet, Gibson, Grand River, 12th W. Warren and Wabash Sts., railroad tracks, and Edsel Ford Expressway; also 4304-14 Trumbull Ave. and 3800 Grand River; also the southeastern corner of Trumbull and Warren; 42°20′50″N 83°4′42″W	The Woodbridge neighborhood was originally developed between 1870 and 1920 with residences built in Queen Anne, Colonial Revival, Georgian Revival, and 'cottage' style architecture. The original commercial districts in the neighborhood were located along Grand River, Trumbull, Twelfth and Fourteenth. The boundaries of the District were increased twice: first on 1997-12-01, and 2008-03-20; these are distinguished in the boundary listings with "also" descriptions. Woodbridge is one of Detroit's rapidly developing neighborhoods as nearby Wayne State University continues to grow.

=== New Center area ===
New Center is a commercial and residential historic district located uptown in Detroit, adjacent to Midtown, one mile (1.6 km) north of the Cultural Center, and approximately three miles (5 km) north of Downtown. The area is centered just west of the intersection of Woodward Avenue and Grand Boulevard, and is approximately bounded by the Virginia Park Historic District on the north, the Edsel Ford Freeway (I-94) on the south, John R Street on the east and the Lodge Freeway on the west.

Name	Image	Location	Summary
Arden Park-East Boston Historic District		Arden Park and E. Boston Aves. between Woodward and Oakland Aves. 42°23′19″N 83°4′49″W	The Arden Park-East Boston Historic District was platted in the 1890s east of Woodward in what was then the far northern reaches of Detroit. The neighborhood was platted with large lots which feature richly planted trees and flowers, and attracts wealthier residents; some of the neighborhood's first residents included Frederick Fisher, John Dodge, and J.L. Hudson. The neighborhood, along with nearby Boston–Edison (also on the register) remained a premier address for residential living in Detroit with about 92 large homes and mansions.
Atkinson Avenue Historic District		Atkinson Avenue between the Lodge Freeway and Linwood Avenue	South of Boston–Edison, it contains approximately 225 homes built from 1915 to 1925.
Boston–Edison Historic District		Roughly bounded by Edison St., Woodward and Linwood Aves. and Glynn Ct. 42°22′54″N 83°5′50″W	The Boston–Edison Historic District is a historic neighborhood consisting of over 900 homes, primarily built from 1905 to 1925 which makes it the largest residential historic district in the nation. Historically significant residents include Henry Ford, James Couzens, Horace Rackham, Charles T. Fisher, Peter E. Martin, C. Harold Wills, Clarence W. Avery, Sebastian S. Kresge, and Clarence Burton. It is one of the largest residential historic district in the nation.
New Amsterdam Historic District		435, 450 Amsterdam;440, 41-47 Burroughs; 5911–5919, 6050-6160 Cass; 6100-6200 Second; 425 York; 42°21′56″N 83°4′21″W	The New Amsterdam Historic District contains a mix of industrial, commercial, and government/utility buildings constructed primarily near the turn of the 20th century. Industry in the district was enabled by the construction of major railroad infrastructure, known as the Milwaukee Junction, in the 1890s. The district includes the original Cadillac assembly plant.
New Center		7430 2nd Ave. and 3011 W. Grand Boulevard; 42°22′11″N 83°4′39″W	The Cadillac Place and the Fisher Building are National Historic Landmarks in the New Center area. The significant complex demonstrates some of the finest craftsmanship and artistry in Art Deco style buildings. Both were funded by the Fisher brothers (of Fisher Body) and designed by Albert Kahn. New Center is a vibrant residential community.
Piquette Avenue Industrial Historic District	Piquette Avenue looking east from Woodward. Fisher Body Plant 23 and the Ford Piquette Avenue plant are on the left; Fisher Body Plant 21 is on the right.	Roughly bounded by Woodward, Harper, Hastings and the Grand Trunk Western Railroad Line; 42°22′5″N 83°3′57″W	The area along Piquette was an important center for automobile production in the early 20th century. Ford Motor Company, Studebaker, Cadillac, Dodge, and Regal Motor Car had plants in the area, as well as suppliers such as Fisher Body. In 1911, the two largest automobile producers in the world, Studebaker and Ford, were located next door to each other on Piquette. The district includes the National Historic Landmark Ford Piquette Avenue Plant.
Virginia Park Historic District		Both sides of Virginia Park From Woodward Ave. to John Lodge Service Dr. 42°22′29″N 83°4′54″W	In 1893, Virginia Park was platted with 92 relatively small lots. Requirements ensured that only well-to-do businessmen and professionals could afford to erect a home in the neighborhood. Most of the homes were built between 1893 and 1915, in Tudor, Neo-Georgian, Bungalow and Arts and Crafts architectural styles.

=== North ===
The northern area includes the Detroit Golf Club and neighborhoods which surround the main campus of the University of Detroit Mercy: Pilgrim Village; Palmer Park Apartment Building Historic District; and the Palmer Woods Historic District. Pilgrim Village, developed in the 1920s, is bounded by Livernois, Idaho, Puritan and Fenkell. It is the birthplace of the Honey Baked Ham Company, which started on Fenkell in 1957. Palmer Park Apartment Building Historic District along with the nearby Palmer Woods Historic District are located within the area. Adjacent to the neighborhood is a 140-acre (0.6 km^{2}) park named Palmer Park. The neighborhood and the park were the property of Thomas Witherell Palmer. The neighborhood consists of stately apartment buildings as well as some single-family detached homes.

Palmer Woods is known for its elm-lined streets, large brick homes, and Tudor style architecture. Palmer Woods is located on the west side of Detroit. It is bordered by 7 Mile Road, M-102 (8 Mile Road), M-1 (Woodward Avenue), and the Sherwood Forest neighborhood. Lots are large, with ample room for trees, play equipment, and a good expanse of grass. It is the home of physicians, academics, business owners, artists, executives and their families.

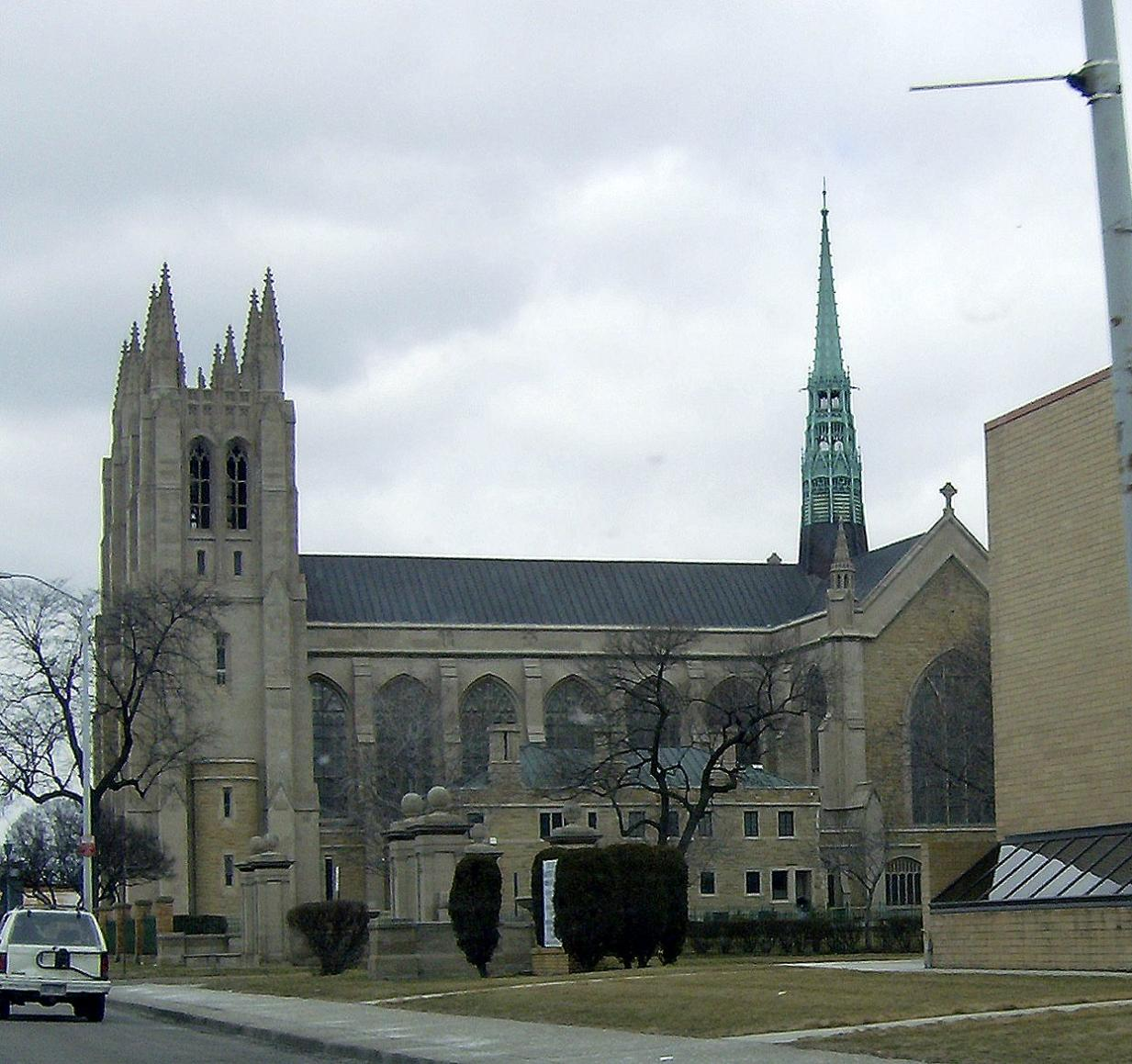
Cathedral of the Most Blessed Sacrament

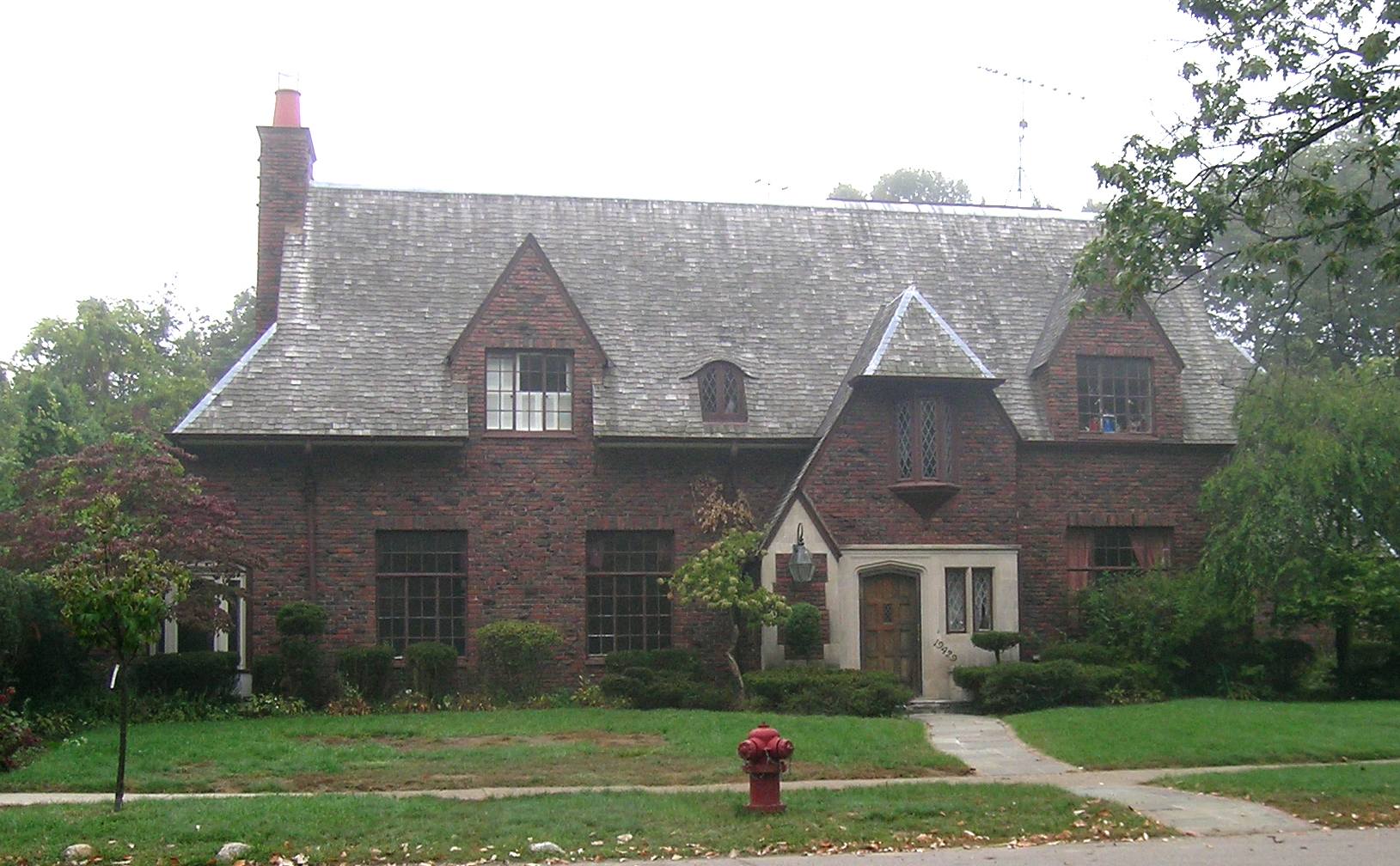
House in Palmer Woods

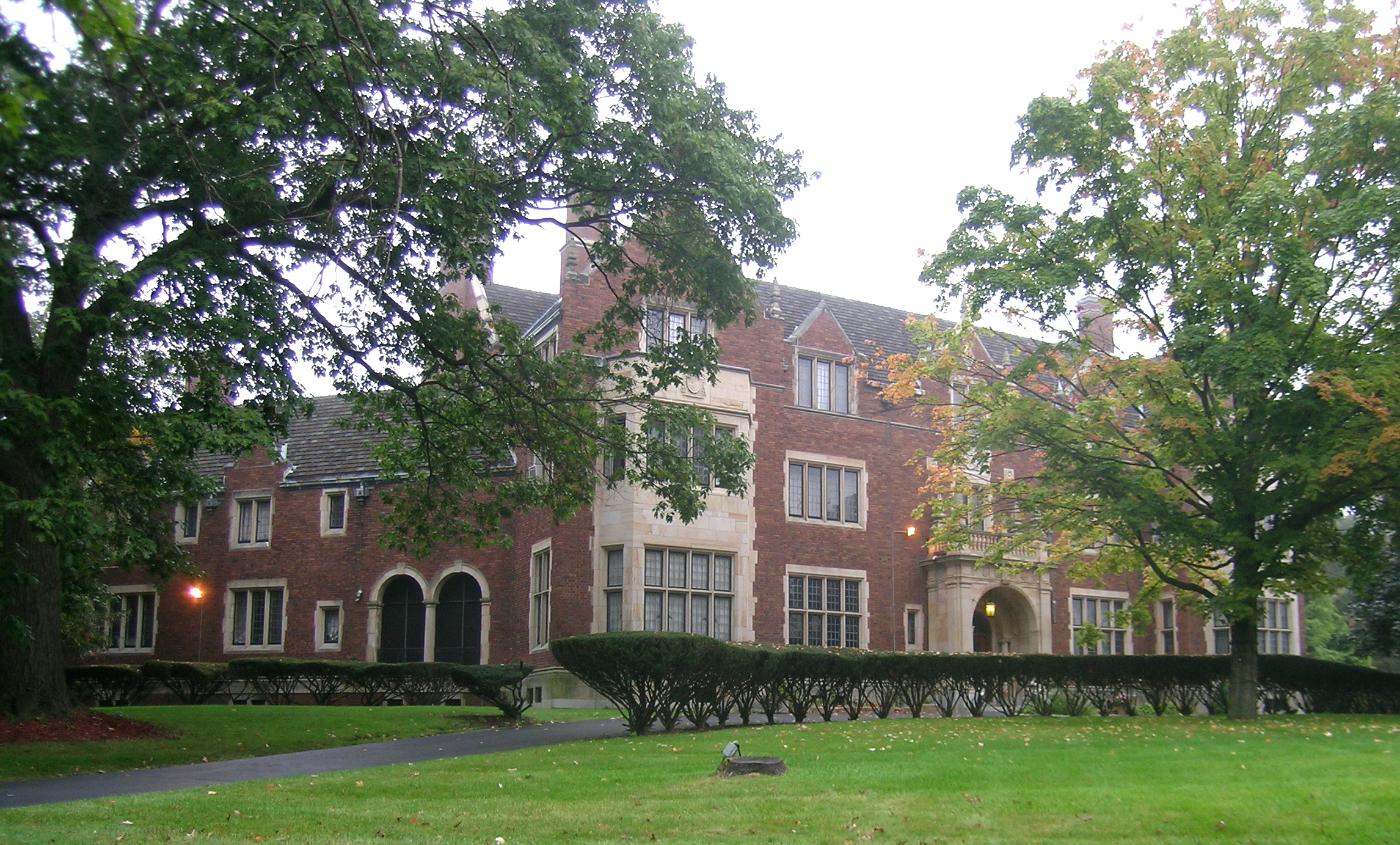
Bishop Gallagher House in Palmer Woods

Name	Image	Location	Summary
Chaldean Town		Along 7 Mile Rd. from Woodward Ave. east to John R. Rd.	Designated in 1999 as an economic district featuring Chaldean-owned businesses, it has a history of residential settlement primarily by Assyrian immigrants dating from the 1960s. Chaldean Town is often seen as a "staging area" for new immigrants to settle before moving on to other ethnic enclaves in the northern suburbs of Detroit, though many retain the ownership of businesses in the area after moving to the suburbs.
Green Acres		8 Mile Rd. is the northern boundary, Livernois is the western, Pembroke is the southern, and Woodward Avenue is the eastern.	Established in 1936 as an residential settlement, known for its housing styles of various 1920s, 1930s, and 1940s well-kept brick tudor and colonial homes.
Grixdale Farms		East of Palmer Park Golf Course. South of 7 Mile. East of Woodward Ave. West of I75 North of McNichols and Highland Park.	A little-known gem of a neighborhood with uniquely designed houses in an enclave of historic homes. Some of its stately homes sit on double-sized tree-lined lots built in the 1920s and 1930s. Once farmland owned by the Grix family in then Greenfield Township. Platted in 1913 by Frank Grix as the Grixdale Home Park Subdivision. The stretch of Woodward Ave. (between 6 Mile and 7 Mile Roads) along Grixdale Farms is recognized as the first full mile of concrete paved road in the United States.
Highland Park		42°24′13″N 83°6′6″W	A separate city within the boundaries of Detroit.
Palmer Park Apartment Building Historic District		Roughly bounded by Pontchartrain Boulevard, McNichols Rd. and Covington Dr. 42°25′11″N 83°6′37″W	The land that this historic district sits on was once the estate of Thomas Palmer. In 1925, Walter Briggs hired Albert Kahn to design an apartment building in the area (this building, at 1001 Covington, was converted to condos in 2005). Forty buildings total were constructed in the district by multiple architects, including Weidmaier and Gay, Robert West, and William Kapp. Most of the buildings were constructed in the 1920s and 1930s, but development continued until 1965.
Palmer Woods		Roughly bounded by Seven Mile Rd., Woodward Ave., and Strathcona Dr. 42°26′5″N 83°7′28″W	Palmer Woods Historic District is named after Thomas W. Palmer, a prominent citizen of 19th-century Detroit and a United States Senator; the district sits on land originally owned by Palmer. The neighborhood was platted in the mid-1910s. It contains many large homes and mansions constructed primarily between from 1917 to 1929. The developer hired landscape architect Ossian Cole Simonds to design the layout.
Sherwood Forest		7 Mile Road is the southern boundary, Livernois is the western, Pembroke is the northern, and Parkside is the eastern.	Developed in 1917, Sherwood Forest features houses with unique architecture, most being constructed before 1940. Sherwood Forest officially became a Detroit Historic District in 2002.
University District		North central, one mile (1.6 km) west of Woodward Ave.	Known for its tree-lined streets, architectural variety, central location in the metropolitan area, and strong sense of community, the neighborhood is named for the University of Detroit Mercy (UDM).The neighborhood is bounded on the north by residential Seven Mile Road, on the south by McNichols Road and the UDM campus, and on the east by the Detroit Golf Club and Golf Club Estates. The western boundary is Livernois Avenue.
University of Detroit Mercy			UDM was ranked in the top tier of Midwestern master's universities in U.S. News & World Report "America's Best Colleges" 2009 edition. The university sponsors 19 NCAA Division I level varsity sports for men and women, and is a member of the Horizon League. It is the largest Roman Catholic university in Michigan. The university offers more than a hundred academic degrees and programs of study, including clinical psychology, business, dentistry, law, engineering, architecture, nursing and allied health.

=== East ===
==== Upper ====
Name	Image	Location	Summary
Chandler Park			Detroit Public Library operates the Chandler Park Branch Library at 12800 Harper. The branch opened at its current location on March 23, 1957. The third floor collection has an emphasis on African American authors.
Cornerstone Village			Formally established as Organized Neighbors East in 1977, this neighborhood changed its name to Cornerstone Village to reflect its location as the easternmost corner of Detroit's east side. Borders Grosse Pointe, Grosse Pointe Farms, Grosse Pointe Woods and Harper Woods. Home of the infamous Balduck Park.
East English Village			The tree-lined streets of East English Village feature a variety of homes ranging from small bungalows to large, luxurious older homes. The housing stock also includes a small number of two-family homes. Grosse Pointe borders it on the South.
Hamtramck		Hamtramck is an incorporated city almost entirely surrounded by Detroit's boundaries.42°23′52″N 83°3′26″W	German farmers established the area, but Polish immigrants flooded into the area when the Dodge Brothers plant opened in 1914. As of the 2000 census, over 22% of Hamtramck's population is of Polish origin; in 1970, it was 90% Polish. A large number of immigrants from the Middle East, and South Asia (especially Bangladesh) have moved to the area.
Highland Heights-Stevens' Subdivision Historic District / North End		Highland Heights area bounded by John R. and California St.42°23′49″N 83°5′13″W North End area bounded by Woodward Avenue to the west, E. Grand Blvd to the south, Chrysler Freeway to the east, and Woodland St. to the north.	There are 422 single-family homes, two apartment buildings, five commercial buildings, and the McGregor Library located within the historic district. Of these, 392 single-family houses, both two apartment buildings, and the library are classified as contributing to the district's historic character. The surrounding North End neighborhood area is a focus neighborhood for the NEXT Detroit Neighborhood Initiative, with specific goals to beautify the neighborhood and strengthen civic leadership. Some in the city have accused the administration of using the NEXT Detroit Neighborhood Initiative to give tax breaks to speculators. Many musicians, such as Aretha Franklin, Smokey Robinson and Diana Ross, are from the North End.
Krainz Woods		7 Mile Road and Ryan Road to E Nevada Street and Mound Road	The neighborhood was named after Captain John Krainz, a World War II hero from Detroit. Nation of Islam member Malcolm X lived on Keystone street in the 1950s. The Sojourner Truth Homes housing project is located there, which housed many Motown-ers singing groups such as The Dramatics & The Floaters. In 2009, Mayor Bing led a ribbon-cutting dedication of Krainz Park.
Milwaukee Junction		East Grand Boulevard to the north, St. Aubin St./Hamtramck Drive to the east, Woodward Avenue to the west, and the border following I-94 to I-75 to Warren Road to the south.	An area with significant history related to the automobile industry, east of the New Center area, it is near the railroad junction of the Detroit and Milwaukee Railroad, and the Grand Trunk Western Railroad lines. One of the largest collections of early 20th century industrial architecture in North America, and the birthplace of the Model T.
MorningSide		Harper Avenue and I-94 to the north, Mack Avenue to the south, E. Outer Drive and Whittier to the west and Alter Road and E. Outer Drive to the east.	MorningSide is an upper east side neighborhood in Detroit encompassing 2.875 square miles (7.45 km^{2}). It is characterized by red brick tudors with wide streets.
Van Steuban / Osborn			In May 2007, Osborn had about 37,000 residents, mostly middle income. In a period before May 2007 Osborne's population grew by 11%, a rarity in Detroit neighborhoods. During that period, the number of children grew by 35.8%; therefore, most of the overall growth in Osborne was of an increase in children. In May 2007, per capita, Osborn had more children than any other neighborhood in Michigan. The neighborhood includes brick homes.
NoHam/Banglatown			Located north of Hamtramck (hence the name "NoHam"), it gained a Bangladeshi American community since 2000 (hence the name "Banglatown"). By 2015 many artists began to congregate in this neighborhood. It is near Interstate 75 and Davison.

==== Central ====
Name	Image	Location	Summary
Eastern Market		Bounded by Gratiot Ave., Riopelle, Rivard, and Division Sts.; also roughly bounded by Gratiot Ave., Riopelle St., Wilkins St., the Grand Trunk Railroad line, and Division St. 42°20′44″N 83°2′22″W	Eastern market, established in the 1850s, is the largest historic public market district in the United States. The district houses food wholesaling and processing businesses as well as public market sheds. St. Joseph Roman Catholic Church is near the Eastern Market.
Forest Park		Bounded by Poletown East and Eastern Market	Forest Park houses the St Albertus Roman Catholic Church and the Detroit Branch of the Federal Reserve Bank. It is a highly desirable neighborhood valued for the fact that demolition of blighted properties, beginning in 2008, started here first. As such, many tracts of land remain sparsely populated with a low density of residents.
Poletown East			Poletown East is the neighborhood area bordering Hamtramck; the high proportion of Polish immigrants gave the neighborhood its name. A portion of the neighborhood known as Poletown became the General Motors Hamtramck assembly plant following the decision of a historic Michigan Supreme Court case.

==== Lower ====
Name	Image	Location	Summary
Belle Isle State Park		Detroit River; 42°20′32″N 82°58′46″W Jefferson 07200s Over bridge to south.	Belle Isle State Park is a 982-acre (397 ha) island state park in the Detroit River, home to the Anna Scripps Whitcomb Conservatory, the Detroit Yacht Club, the Detroit Boat Club, the Dossin Great Lakes Museum, a Coast Guard post, and a golf course. Until its November 2013 conversion to a state park, it was largest island city park in the United States.
St. Charles Borromeo Roman Catholic Parish Complex		Baldwin Ave. at St. Paul Ave. 42°21′18″N 83°0′7″W	In 1886, a parish dedicated to St. Charles Borromeo was established to minister to the eastside area where in influx of Belgians had settled. As Detroit grew, the parish grew along with it, with French, German, Irish, Scotch, and English congregants in addition to the original Belgians. By 1920, the congregation numbered over 3000.
Eastside Historic Cemetery District		Bounded by Elmwood and Mt. Elliot Aves., Lafayette and Waterloo Sts. 42°20′59″N 83°1′5″W	The Eastside Historic Cemetery District consists of three separate cemeteries: Mount Elliott Cemetery (Catholic, established 1841), Elmwood Cemetery (Protestant, established 1846), and the Lafayette Street Cemetery (Jewish, established 1850), spreading over 150 acres (61 ha) in total. The cemeteries are known for the monuments, landscaping, and notable individuals interred there.
East Grand Boulevard Historic District		E. Grand Boulevard, between E. Jefferson Ave. and Mack Ave. 42°21′12″N 83°0′22″W	The East Grand Boulevard Historic District includes a few moderate-sized apartment buildings and numerous large homes constructed primarily between 1900 and 1925. The apartment buildings in the district include the El Tovar Apartments, Saint Paul Manor Apartments, and the Kingston Arms Apartments.
East Jefferson Avenue Residential District		E. Jefferson Avenue. 42°20′28″N 83°1′0″W	Contains many prominent residences including the Alden Park Towers.
Indian Village		Bounded by Mack, Burns, Jefferson, and Seminole Aves. 42°21′40″N 82°59′48″W	Indian Village has a number of architecturally-significant homes built in the early 20th century. Many of the homes were built by prominent architects such as Albert Kahn, Louis Kamper and William Stratton for some of the area's most prominent citizens such as Edsel Ford.
Island View		Bounded by Baldwin St. on the east.	Immediately west of West Village, Island View is bound by Jefferson to the south, Mack to the north, Baldwin to the east, and Mt. Elliott to the west. The eastern boundary of the neighborhood, Baldwin Street, was the Detroit city limit until 1891. The eastern portion features many large turn of the 20th century single and multi-family homes, apartment buildings and brick row houses. The western portion is home to several non-profits, including the Capuchin Soup Kitchen, the Earthworks Urban Farming Project, and Gleaners Food Bank. Large portions of the neighborhood, (especially the southeastern portion close to West Village) are undergoing a rebirth with several new housing developments by community-based Messiah Housing Corp. and Islandview Development Corp. English Village, a luxury condominium, townhouse and loft development is being constructed along Townsend, Sheridan and Field streets just south of Kercheval. Islandview is named for its close proximity to Detroit's island park, Belle Isle.
Jefferson-Chalmers Historic Business District		Between Eastlawn and Alter. 42°22′26″N 82°56′34″W	The district has recently seen a resurgence, with a Michigan Cool Cities grant, five million dollars' worth of streetscape improvements, and rehabilitation of a number of anchor buildings in the district, such as the Platte Warehouse at Jefferson and Ashland and the Chalmers Building at Jefferson and Chalmers.
Lafayette Park / Mies van der Rohe Residential District		Roughly bounded by Lafayette Ave., Rivard, Antietam, and Orleans Sts. 42°20′31″N 83°2′8″W	Mies van der Rohe, Ludwig Hilberseimer and Alfred Caldwell planned this 78-acre (32 ha) urban renewal project constructed on the site of the former Black Bottom area. Lafayette Park includes a landscaped, 19-acre (7.7 ha) park with no through traffic, in which these and other low-rise apartment buildings are sited. The apartment buildingsare classic examples of Mies' International Style, with their simplicity, clean proportions, and cladding of tinted glass and aluminum.
Rivertown		East Jefferson Avenue	On the east end, Rivertown includes Detroit's upscale high rise Harbortown condominiums and marina near the MacArthur Bridge leading to Belle Isle State Park. On the west end, this neighborhood contains several architecturally significant midrise condominium buildings, including the Albert Kahn-designed Garden Court Condominiums.
West Village		Roughly bounded by Jefferson, Kercheval, Parker and Seyburn Aves. 42°21′16″N 82°59′53″W	The West Village Historic District is a neighborhood just west of Indian Village. It is a primarily residential neighborhoods containing 275 single and two-family houses, thirty apartment buildings, and about twenty commercial structures of a wide range of architectural styles spread over 20 square blocks. It has many Victorian homes and four squares with apartment buildings and row houses interspersed in between. A walkable urban neighborhood, it is an advantageous location just 2 miles (3.2 km) east of downtown Detroit and minutes from Belle Isle State Park and the new Detroit Riverwalk make it a popular neighborhood. Many historic homes and apartment buildings have recently been restored. Its commercial areas include a short stretch along Agnes Street in the center of the neighborhood and along Kercheval and busy Jefferson Avenue.

=== West ===
==== North ====
Name	Image	Location	Summary
Bagley		West of the Palmer Woods/Sherwood Forest/University District.	The Bagley community is an area in Northwest Detroit whose boundaries are West Outer Drive to the north, Livernois Avenue to the east, West McNichols (Six Mile Road) to the south, and Wyoming Avenue to the west. The community's name is likely derived from Bagley Elementary School, which is the lone public school within the community.
Grandmont	Representative architecture of Grandmont neighborhood in Detroit, MI	Bounded by Grand River Ave, Southfield Svc Dr, Schoolcraft Ave, and Asbury Park	Grandmont's 800 homes are situated on 80 acres originally deeded by Andrew Jackson in 1835. By 1916, the Grandmont subdivision was platted. The homeowners association was formed in 1927.
Martin Park			According to a 2017 Model D Media article the neighborhood was previously more stable but was affected by a post-Vietnam War influx of drugs. By 2018 the New Martin Park District Association was established.
Old Redford		Grand River Avenue and Lahser Road.	Stretches from Telegraph east to Burt Road and from 7 Mile Road to Puritan Road, Old Redford encompasses approximately 8 to 10 square miles (21 to 26 km^{2}) of land. It was originally part of Redford Township outside of the city limits, but was annexed in 1926. Much of the housing stock near the center of the area is a mixture of early 1900s (decade) to 1940s homes. The Redford Theatre is within the area.
Rosedale Park		Roughly bounded by Fenkell, Outer Dr. W. Grand River Ave., the Southfield Freeway, Glastonbury, Lyndon, Westwood Dr. 42°24′1″N 83°13′37″W	Construction in Rosedale Park was accomplished primarily in the 1920s and the late 1930s/early 1940s. houses were built in a multitude of styles, including English Tudor revival, Arts and Crafts, Bungalow, Colonial Revival, Dutch Colonial, American Foursquare, Prairie, but an English country esthetic seems to have been encouraged, and many homes have English Tudor details. In North Rosedale Park, there is a civic association (NRPCA), club house and park. The Rosedale Park Community House is home to the Jim Dandy Ski Club.
Greenwich Park		W. 7 Mile Rd to Pembroke and Meyers to Schaefer	Greenwich Park is a community of 800 homes & 33 businesses. Its boundaries are the north-side of W. 7 Mile Rd. to the south-side of Pembroke & the east-side of Schaefer to the west-side of Meyers.

==== Central ====
Name	Image	Location	Summary
Parkland		Roughly bounded by West Warren, Ann Arbor Trail, West Parkway, and Parkland.	Parkland is a neighborhood in far western Detroit, bordering Warrendale.
Warrendale		Warren Ave.	Warrendale is one of Detroit's largest neighborhoods. Its approximate borders are Joy Road to the north, Greenfield road to the east, and the city limits in other directions. Warrendale borders the communities of Dearborn and Dearborn Heights. Rouge Park, located on each side of the Rouge River, joins Warrendale.

=== Southwest / Near West ===
Detroit Public Library operates the Bowen Branch Library at 3648 West Vernor Highway. On December 28, 1912, the branch opened in its current location. The area includes the historic Michigan Central Station and the Ambassador Bridge.

Name	Image	Location	Summary
Corktown		Roughly bounded by Lodge Freeway, Porter, Trumbull, Bagley, Rosa Parks Boulevard, and Michigan Ave. 42°19′46″N 83°4′27″W	Corktown is the oldest surviving neighborhood in Detroit, dating to the 1850s. The name comes from the Irish immigrants who settled there; they were predominantly from County Cork. The neighborhood is primarily residential, but the district does include some commercial buildings, mostly along Michigan Avenue.
Delray		Boundaried by Fort Street to the west with Clark Street and the Detroit River to its east.	Delray is a residential area in the industrial south side of the city. It is isolated from other residential communities by industrial warehouses and other commercial properties. Delray is bordered by the cities of Dearborn, Melvindale, and River Rouge to its south, Nearby is the Ford River Rouge Complex (constructed as the largest industrial complex in the world at the time).
Hubbard Farms		Bounded by W Vernor Hwy. to the north, West Grand Boulevard to the east, Lafayette Ave. to the south, and Clark St. to the west.	Hubbard Farms is a residential neighborhood named after Bela Hubbard (1814–1896) who owned much of the area during his lifetime and whose Italianate mansion Vinewood rested on the property from 1856 to 1933. Originally a number of French ribbon farms, followed by farms and wooded estates, the area was annexed into the City of Detroit in 1885 which lead to the development of residential housing throughout. Significant architecture spans the years from approximately 1870 though 1930, representing a variety of styles including Victorian Eclectic, Italianate, Romanesque, Tudor Revival, Beaux Arts, and American Four Square. Clark Park, named for John Pearson Clark who donated the land to the city for use as a public park, is located in Hubbard Farms.
North Corktown			North Corktown came into existence after the construction of I-75. Before this period North Corktown was part of the Corktown neighborhood.
Mexicantown		Roughly, from Clark St. along W. Vernor Hwy. to Ste. Ann St., one block north of the Ambassador Bridge, Porter and Bagley, excluding the area within known as Hubbard farms.	With a 6.9 percent population rise to 96,000 from 1990 to 2000, the city's revitalized Mexicantown has improved the local economy. About half the residents are Hispanic, 25% are African American, 20% are non-Hispanic white and 5% are Arab American, according to the Southwest Detroit Business Association. Despite its name, the neighborhood's Hispanic community is not exclusively Mexican, and has a significant number of Puerto Ricans and other Hispanics as well. Though over half of the Hispanics in the area are of Mexican origin. It is known for Mexican cuisine at many restaurants. Restaurants, bakeries, and shops are located on Vernor Highway. Mexicantown has had a thriving economy in the 2000s (decade), as evidenced by new housing and increased business openings. Clark Park, named for John Pearson Clark who donated much of the land to the city, borders the neighborhood. Ste. Anne de Detroit Catholic Church is north of the Ambassador Bridge.
Springwells		Boundaried by Dix Hwy. to the north, Waterman St. to east, Fort St. to the south, and Woodmere St. to the west.	Springwells is largely residential. It includes the West Vernor–Springwells and West Vernor–Lawndale Historic Districts Historic, which are commercial districts located along West Vernor Highway.
Westside Industrial		Boundaried by Bagley, Labrosse, and Porter Streets to the north, Sixth St. and John C. Lodge Freeway to east, Detroit River to the south, and Rosa Parks Blvd. & railroad tracks to the west.	Springwells is largely residential. It includes the West Vernor–Springwells and West Vernor–Lawndale Historic Districts Historic, which are commercial districts located along West Vernor Highway.
West Vernor–Junction Historic District		W. Vernor Highway between Lansing and Cavalry; 42°19′2″N 83°6′7″W	The West Vernor–Junction Historic District is a mixed use district located along West Vernor Highway. The district encompasses 160 acres (65 ha) and 44 buildings, including the Most Holy Redeemer Church, which was once estimated as the largest Catholic parish in North America. The West Vernor–Junction Historic District, which is listed in the National Register of Historic Places, is adjacent to Mexicantown and contains a large vibrant Latino community and resurgent neighborhoods.
West Vernor–Lawndale Historic District		W. Vernor Highway between Cabot and Ferris; 42°18′33″N 83°7′57″W	The West Vernor–Lawndale Historic District is a commercial district located along West Vernor Highway between. The district encompasses 30 acres (12 ha) and 10 buildings. Patton Park, named for U.S. General George S. Patton of World War II, is within the district.
West Vernor–Springwells Historic District		W. Vernor Highway between Honorah and Norman; 42°18′44″N 83°7′35″W	The West Vernor–Springwells Historic District is a commercial district located along West Vernor Highway. The district encompasses 80 acres (32 ha) and 28 buildings.

== See also ==
- Woodward Corridor
