= Hubbard Farms, Detroit =

Human settlement in Detroit, Michigan, United States of America

Coordinates: 42.319°N 83.09°W

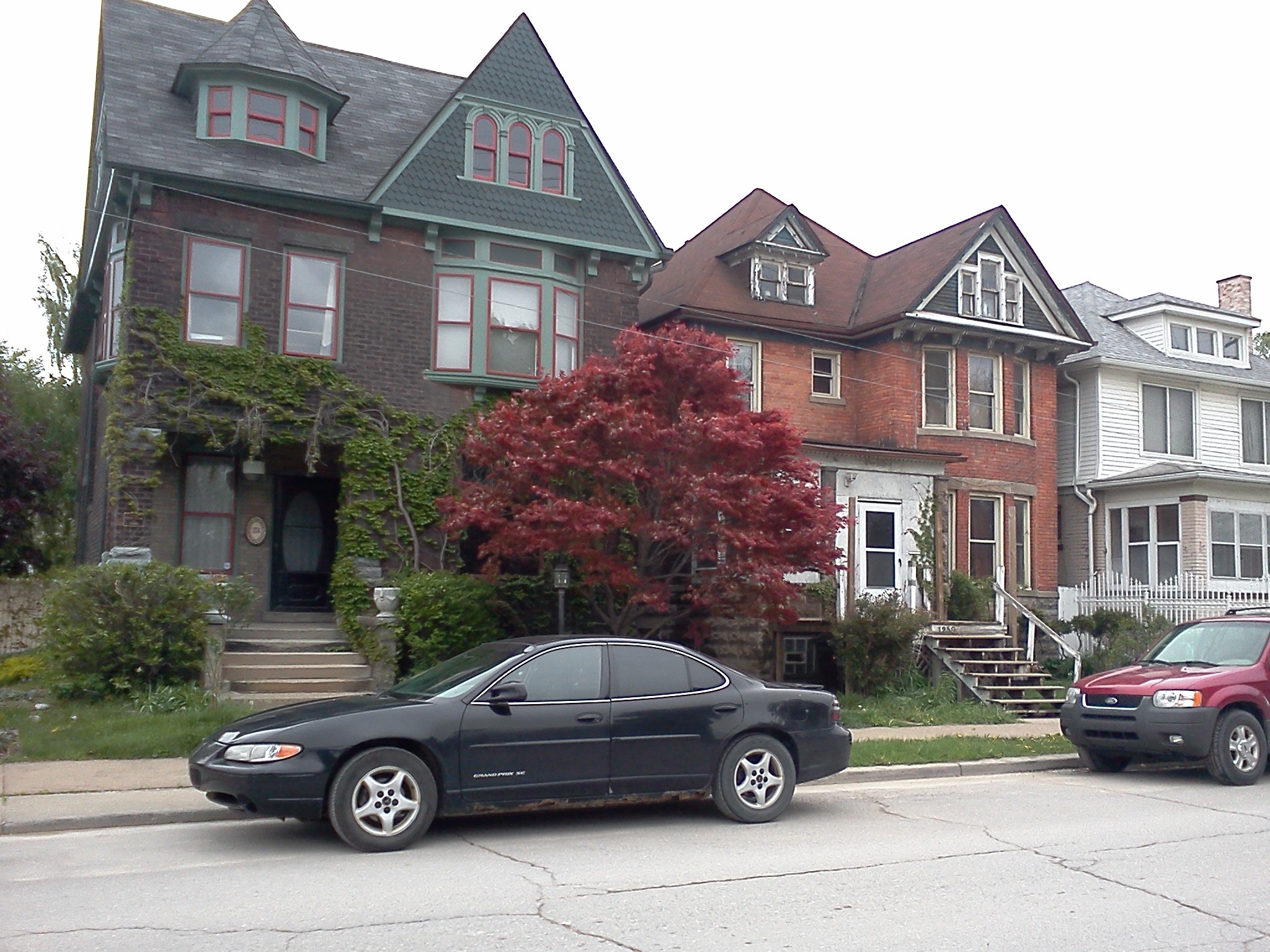

Hubbard Farms is a neighborhood located in Detroit, Michigan. It is located on one of the old plots which used to be a ribbon farm along the Detroit River. It is bound by Clark St to the west, W Vernor Hwy to the north, W Grand Blvd to the east, and W Lafayette Blvd to the south. In 1993, it received its official historic district designation.

Dating back before French fur traders colonized the Detroit area, the district was used by the Pottawatomie tribes as a local burial ground. After the area was colonized by the French in the 1700s, the land was granted to Robert Navarre, the royal notary at Fort Ponchartrain, who then split the land grant into five ribbon farms along the Detroit River.

After the end of the War of 1812, many English immigrants in the area began to buy subplots and establish smaller farms. One of the first U.S. citizens to own land in the area was Whitmore Knagg, a military interpreter and frontier Indian fighter. He then sold some of this property to the Hubbard family in 1835.

The district was named after Bela Hubbard, a prominent local geologist, lumber baron, land agent, lawyer, farmer, historian and civic leader. In the 1830s, Bela made an early contribution to archaeology: as he surveyed the property, he realized that the area had once been a Pottawatomie village and burial ground. He conducted an excavation and discovered many tribal artifacts. When the State of Michigan was founded in 1837, Bela was named Michigan's first assistant geologist.

Once the Civil War came to an end, Detroit experienced an influx of manufacturing jobs, which created a housing need. Hubbard Farms soon became home to executives and workers such as David Scotten, the owner of the Hiawatha Tobacco Works factory. In 1885, the district was incorporated into Detroit.

Much of the architecture in the community was designed and built between the 1880s and the World War I. Although the area has an overall Victorian feel, the time range for construction and the affluence of the area is reflected in diverse architectural styles and choices. The district features homes that display Romanesque, Colonial Revival, Beaux Arts, Federalist and even Italianate designs.

== Places ==
Hubbard Farms has become a hub for artists and their spaces, with an unusual density of artist-in-residence or other places which carve out creative niches. This is seen in examples like SpreadArt, Southwest Housing Solution's Whitdel building, and El Club. What Pipeline is a contemporary art gallery in the area. Hubbard Farms has a community garden on Hubbard and Vinewood, both north of Porter.

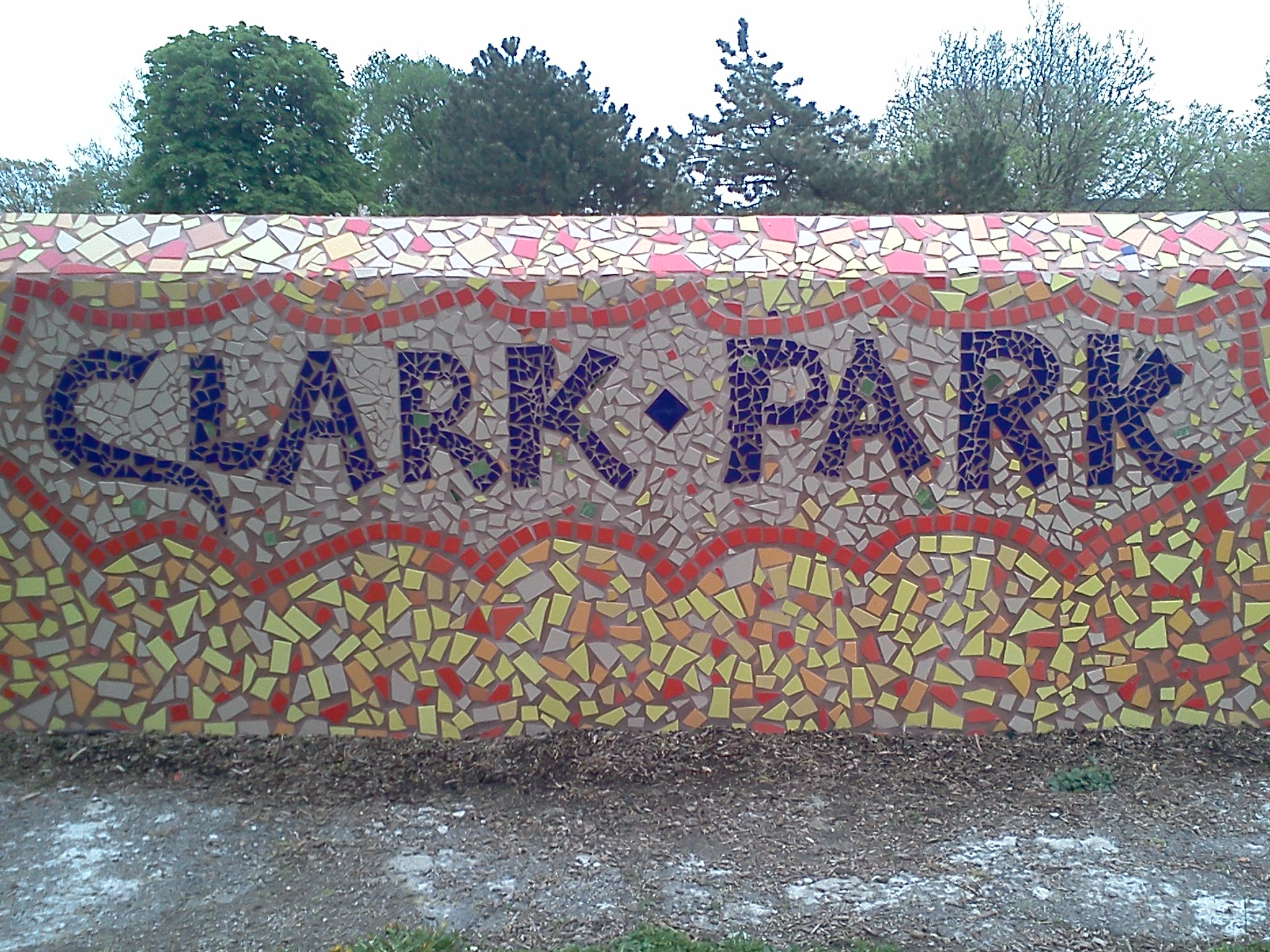

There is a large park, Clark Park, currently managed by the Clark Park Coalition. It serves as the district’s "town square," hosting festivals, fairs, sporting events and extracurricular activities for the youth in the community. The coalition emerged in 1991 in response to the closing of the park by the Detroit Recreational Department.

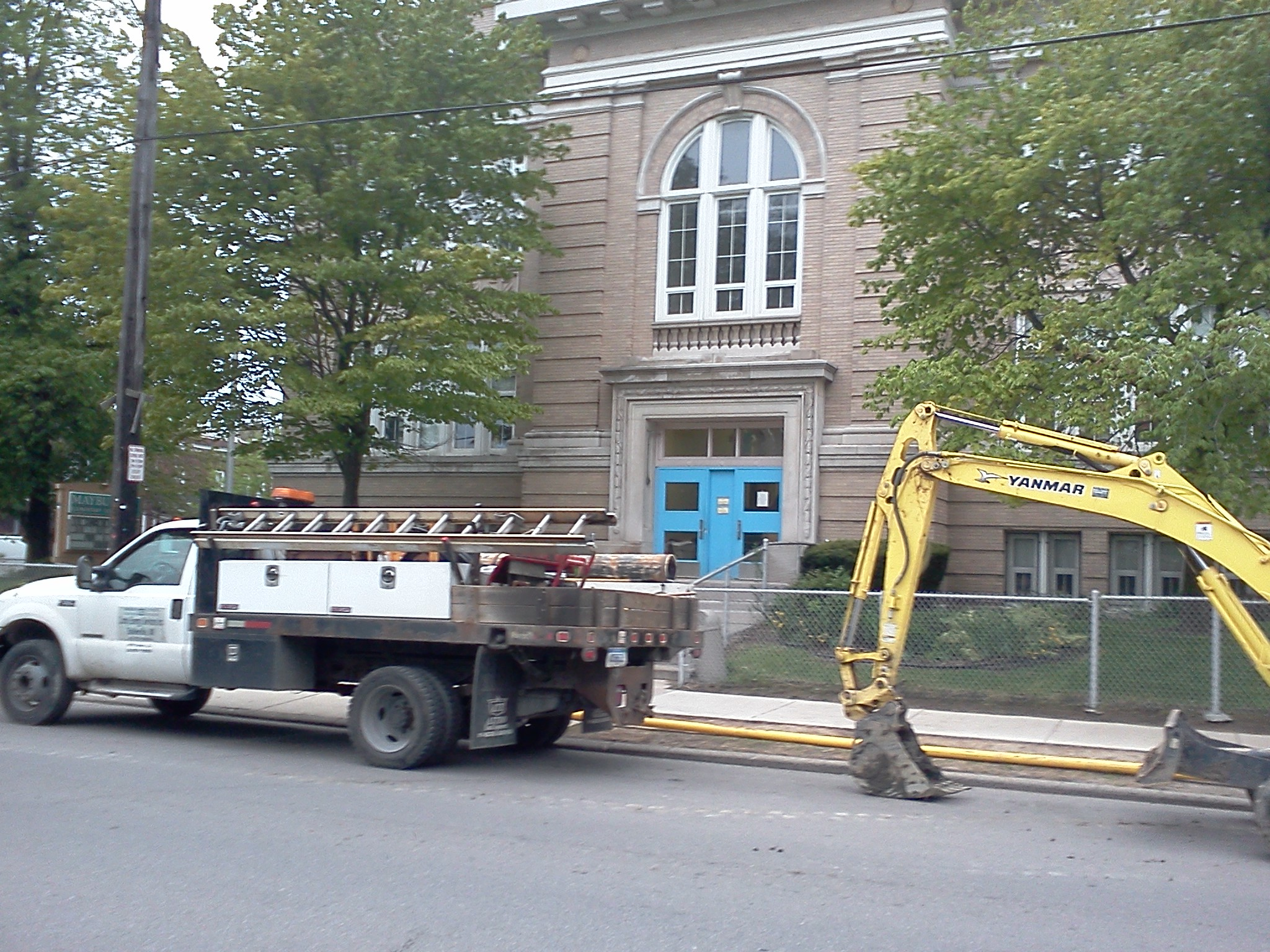

All school grades are located within Hubbard Farms.

Maybury Elementary School - Located across the street from Clark Park, this school has a distinct style of architecture, and its white brick stands out from the surrounding homes. Just like its counterparts, Western International High School and Earhart Middle School, the Latino population is evidenced in its student body, which is 78.7% Latino, according to the school’s profile report of 2009. It uniquely offers Spanish literacy for native speakers and a Montessori option PreK-2.

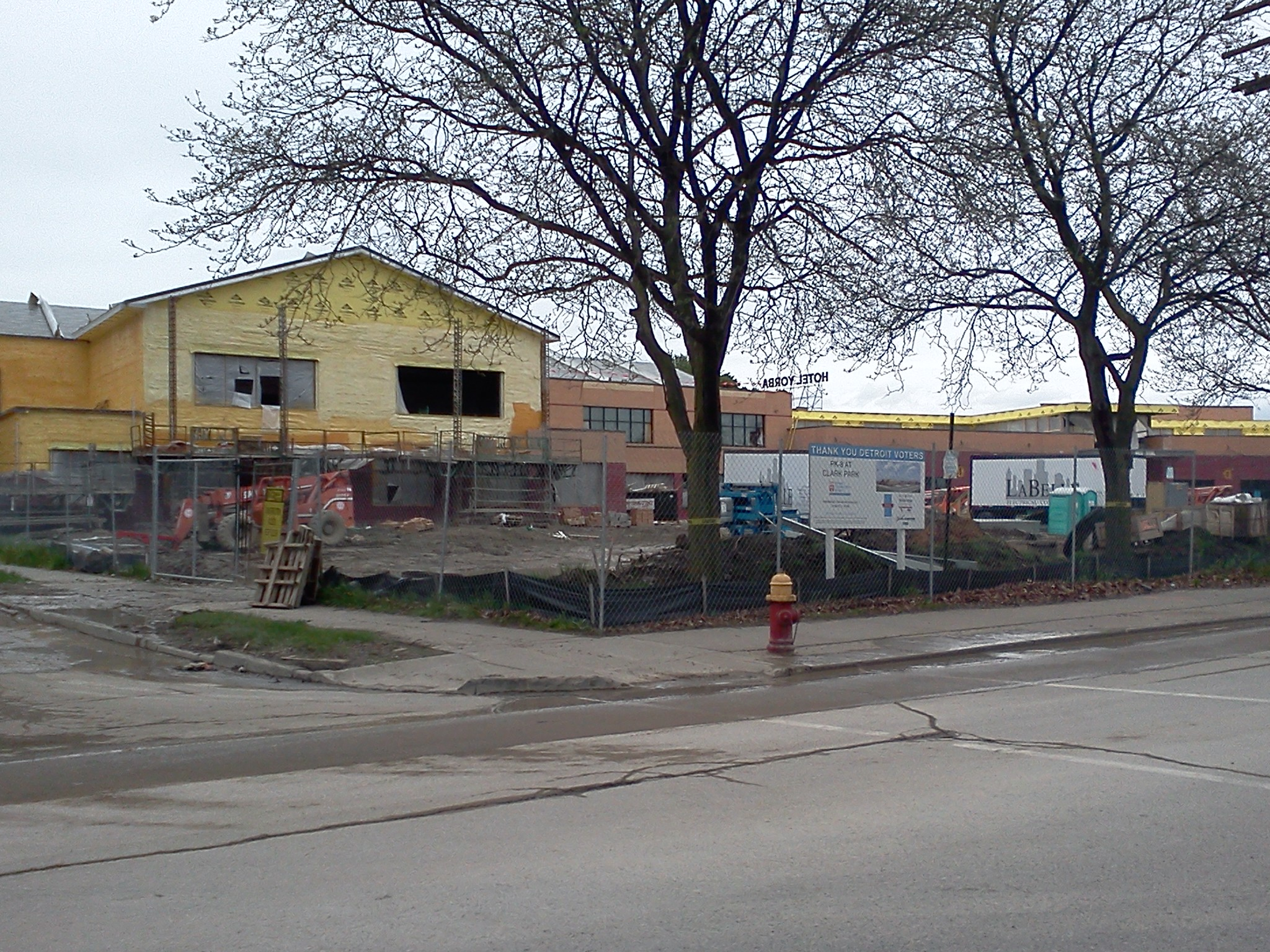

Amelia Earhart Elementary-Middle School - On the southern edge of the Hubbard Farms is Amelia Earhart Elementary-Middle School. 59.7% of its students are Latino.

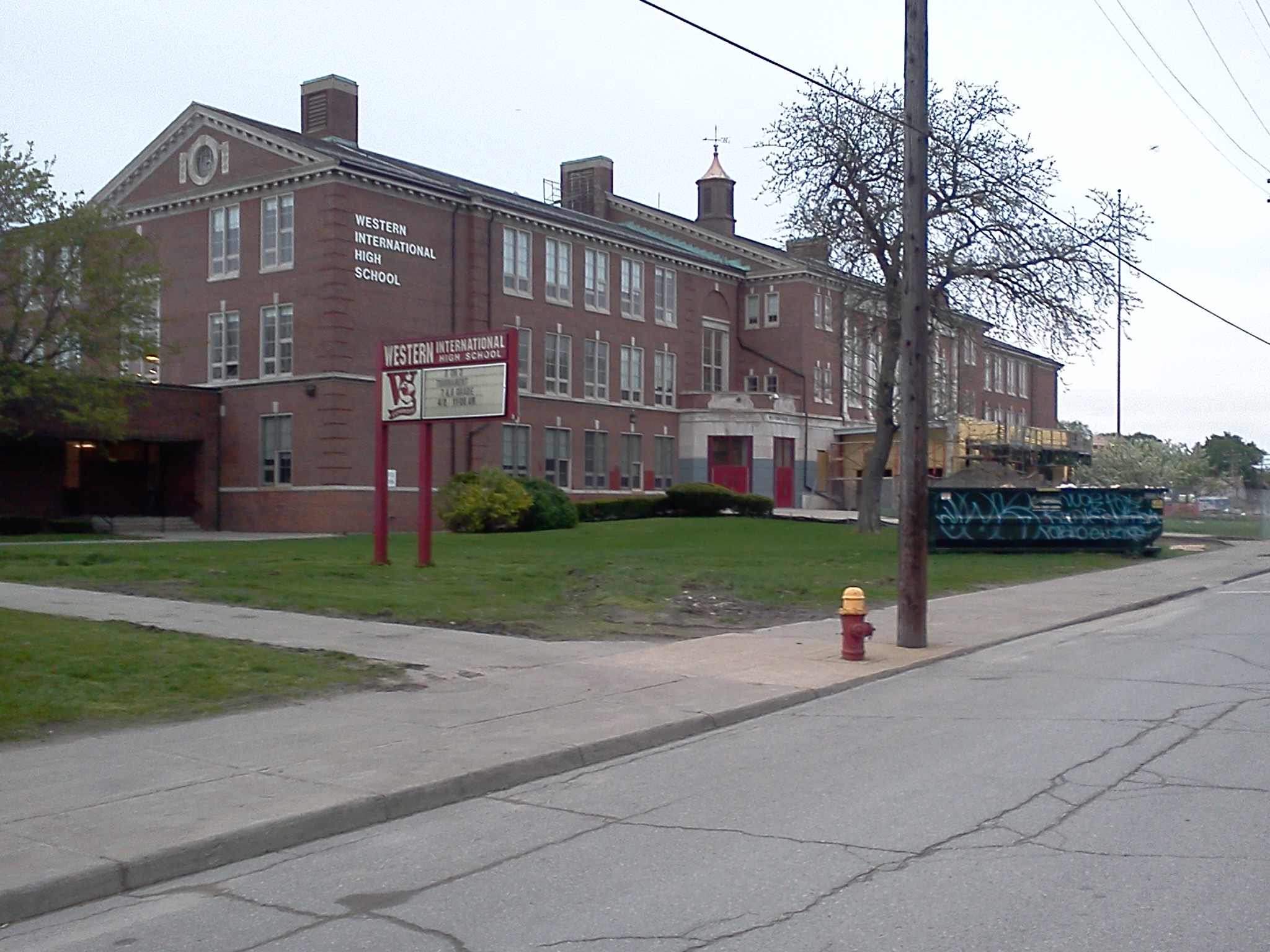

Western International High School - Located across from Clark Park, this high school has evidenced the change in the demographics of the population in the neighborhood since it was built. 61.2% of its students are Latino.
