= Warrendale =

Warrendale may refer to:

- Warrendale (film), a Canadian documentary film
- Warrendale, Detroit, a neighbourhood of Detroit, Michigan
- Warrendale, Oregon, a community in Oregon
- Warrendale, Pennsylvania, a suburb of Pittsburgh
- Warrendale, Waltham, a neighborhood of Waltham, Massachusetts
