= Parkland, Detroit =

Neighborhood located in Detroit, Michigan, United States

Coordinates: 42.3457°N 83.2596°W

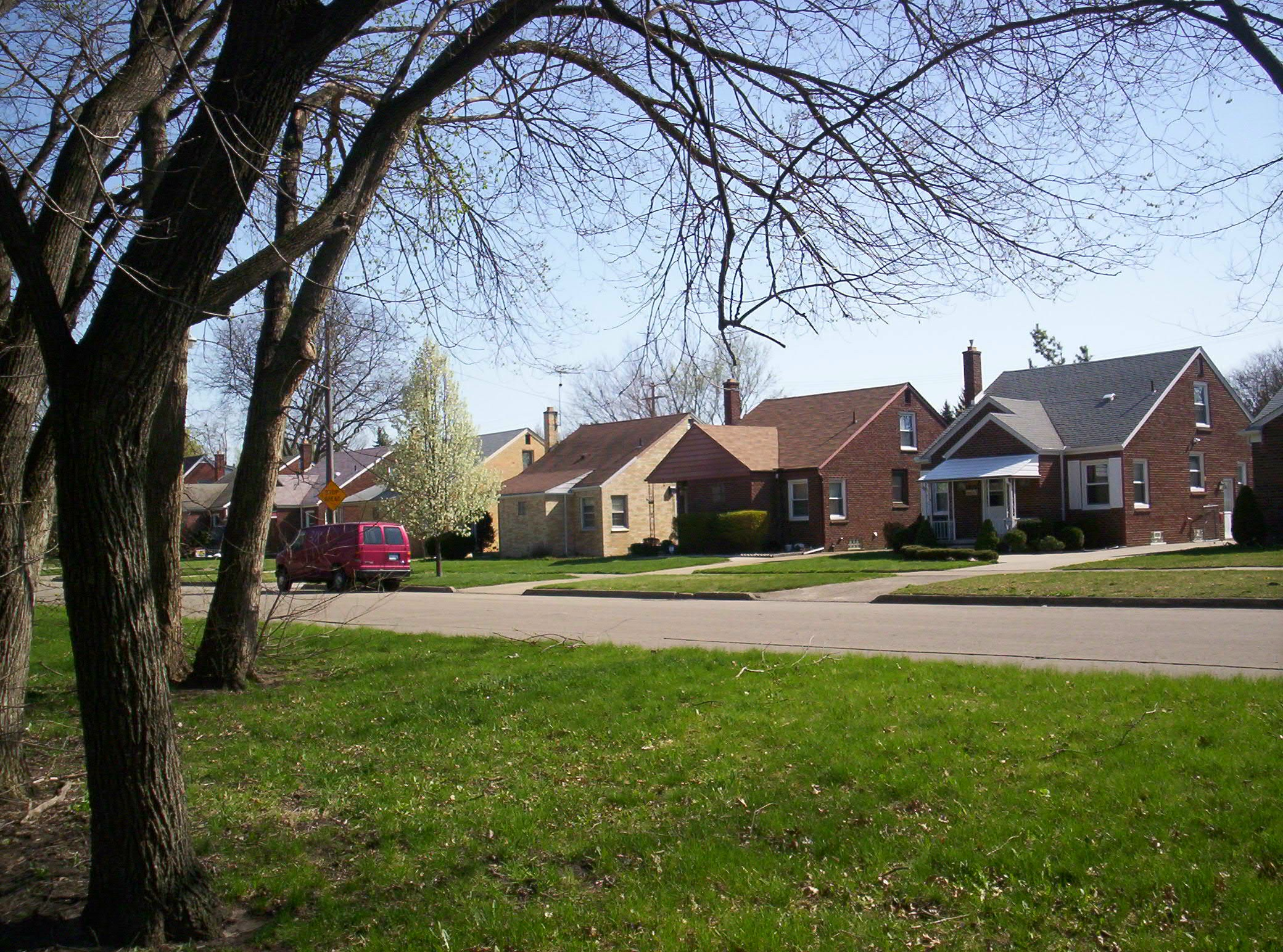
A typical residential street in Parkland

Parkland is a neighborhood located in the far western section of Detroit, Michigan. The neighborhood is often thought to be part of the neighboring Warrendale neighborhood, which it borders to the east.

Parkland is roughly bounded by West Warren Avenue, Ann Arbor Trail, West Parkway Street, and Parkland Street. West Warren Avenue is the neighborhood's only commercial district, while the rest of the neighborhood consists mainly of single-family homes. Parkland was annexed by the city of Detroit in the 1920s. Along with the Parkland neighborhood the city also annexed additional land directly to the east, which was turned into Rouge Park (the city's largest inland park at 2 square miles (5 km^{2})). The majority of the homes in Parkland were built between the 1920s and the 1950s. Bungalow-style homes are the neighborhood's most prominent architectural style, followed by colonial-style and single-story homes. With a white population of 65 percent Parkland is one of Detroit's few white majority neighborhoods.

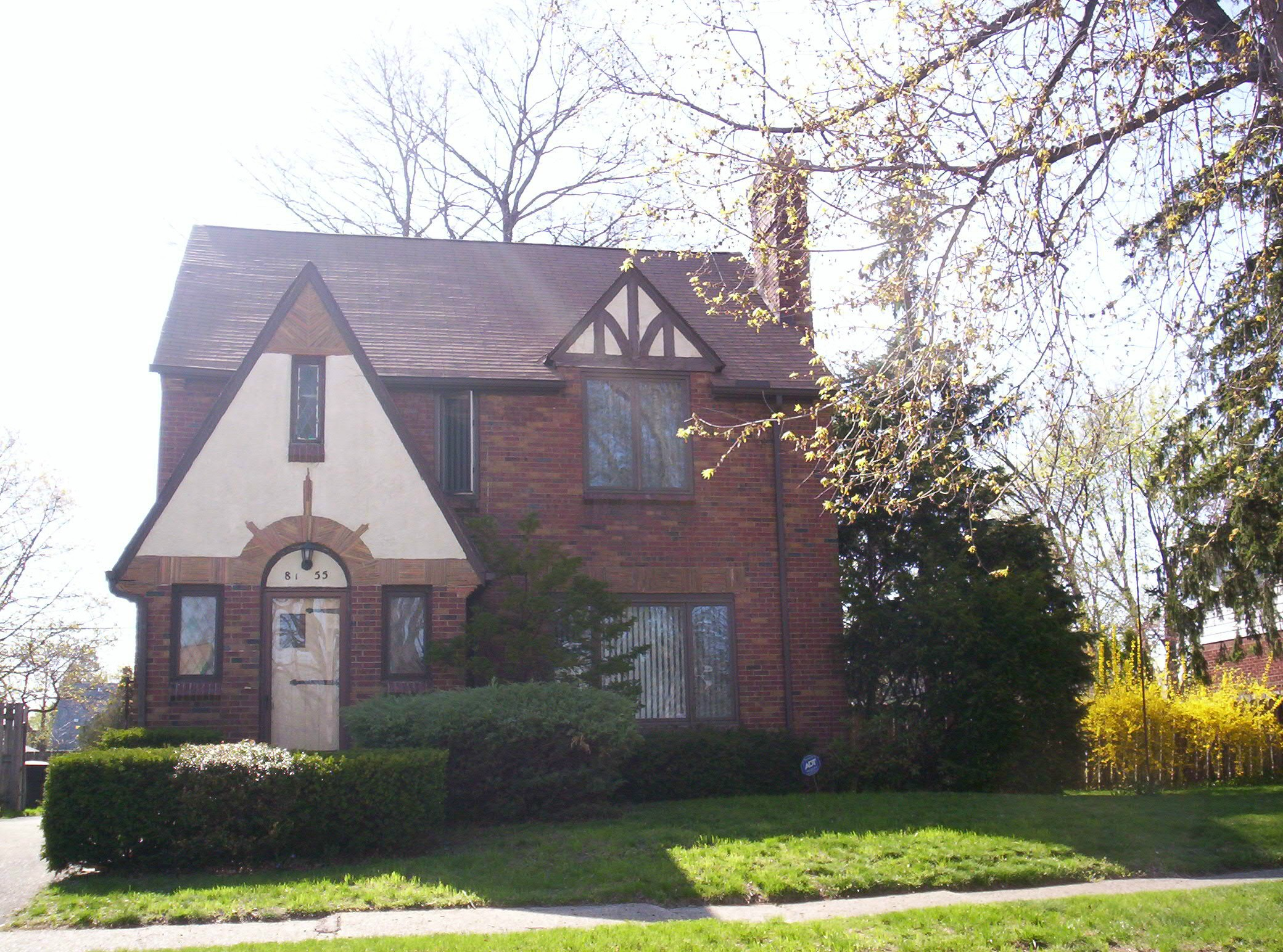
A Parkland home.

== Education ==
Residents are zoned to Ann Arbor Trail Elementary School in Parkland, Lessenger Middle School, and Frank Cody High School. Wayne County Community College District serves Parkland.
