= Highland Heights–Stevens' Subdivision Historic District =

Historic district in Michigan, United States

- U.S. National Register of Historic Places
- U.S. Historic district
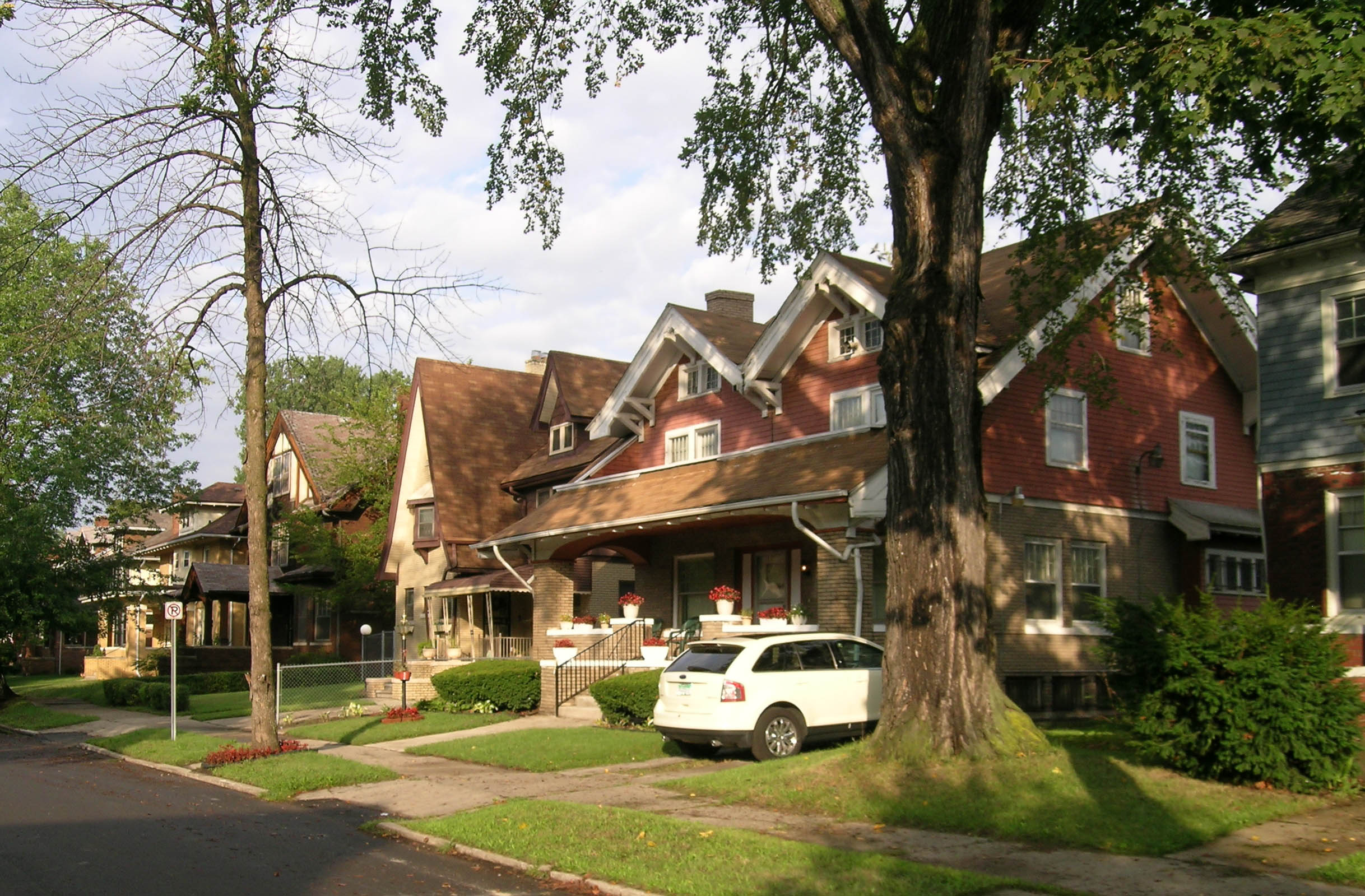
- Streetscape on Massachusetts Street between Woodward and John R.

- Location within Michigan Location within the United States
- Interactive map
- Location: Highland Park, Michigan
- Coordinates: 42°23′49″N 83°5′13″W
- Architectural style: Late 19th And 20th Century Revivals, Bungalow/Craftsman
- NRHP reference No.: 88000050
- Added to NRHP: February 8, 1988

Highland Heights–Stevens' Subdivision Historic District is a residential historic district located in Highland Park, Michigan along five east-west streets: Farrand Park, McLean Street, Colorado Street, Rhode Island Street, and Massachusetts Street, between Woodward Avenue on the west and Oakland Avenue on the east. The district was listed on the National Register of Historic Places in 1988.

== Significance ==
The structures in the neighborhood are primarily single-family homes built in the early twentieth century. The area features an unusually high concentration of high quality, middle class housing stock, built over a short period of time, with much of it still well-preserved.

== Description ==
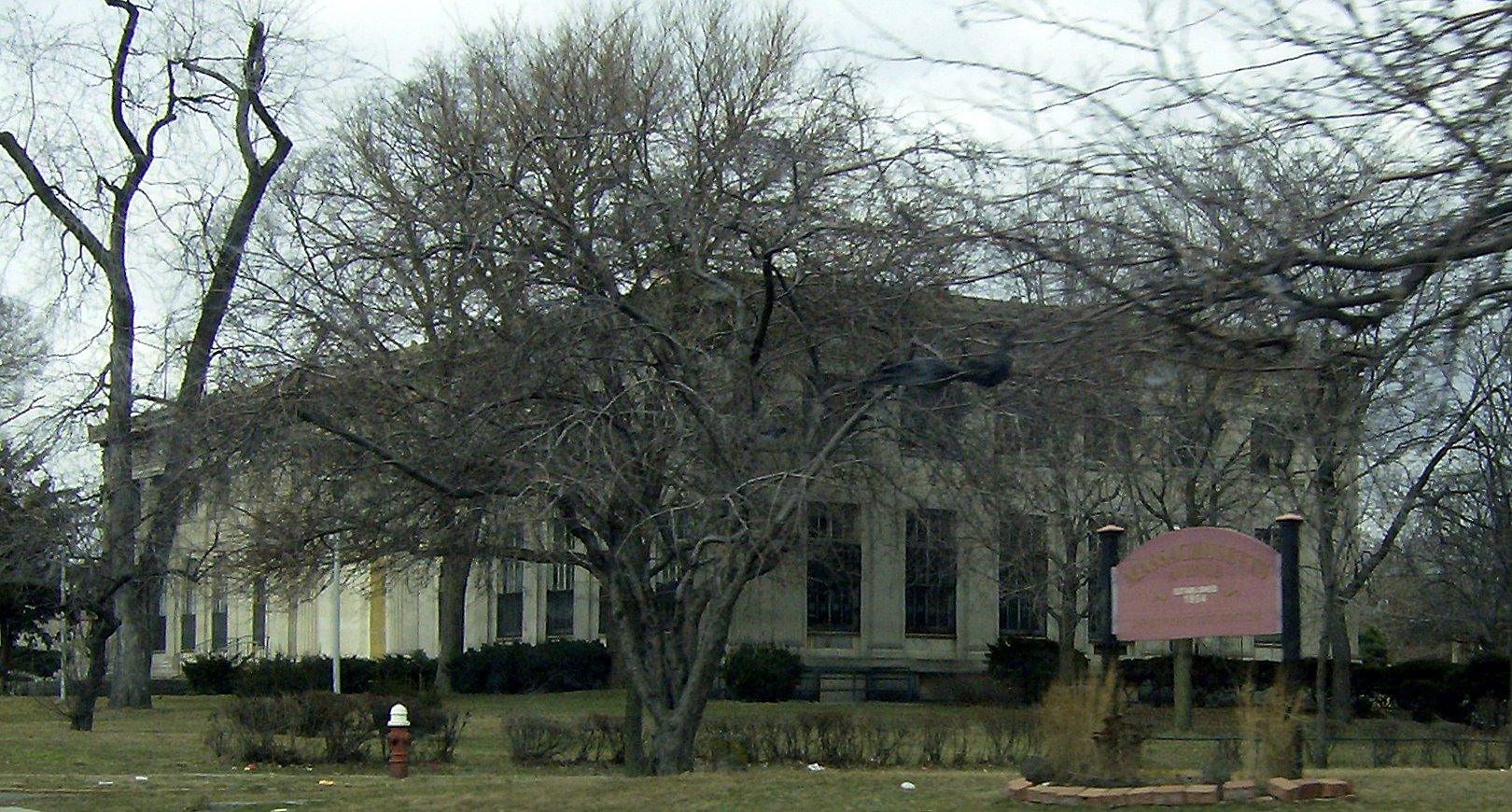
McGregor Public Library (1926)

The Highland Heights–Stevens' Subdivision Historic District is a neighborhood of primarily single-family detached homes. There are 422 single-family homes, two apartment buildings, five commercial buildings, and the McGregor Library located within the district. Of these, 392 single-family houses, both two apartment buildings, and the library are classified as contributing to the district's historic character.

The houses are fine representation of the variety of American residential architecture in the years 1900-1930. Styles represented include foursquares, bungalows, and various revival styles. There are also 393 garages in the district, located along back alleys. Of these, 373 appear to have been constructed in the years of the area's initial development, and their presence and construction reflects the upwardly mobile, middle-class character of the neighborhood.

== Gallery ==
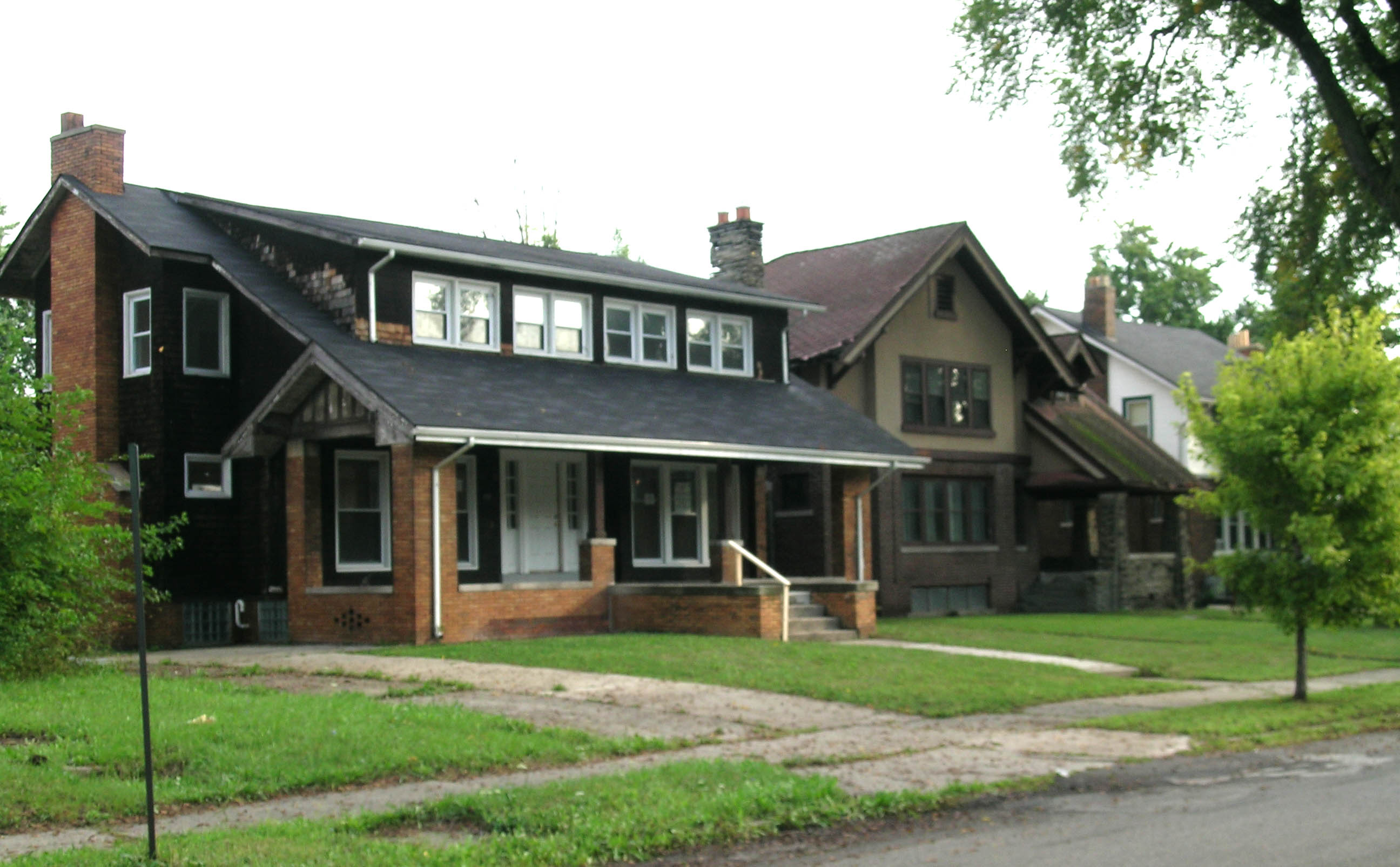
Homes on Rhode Island Street

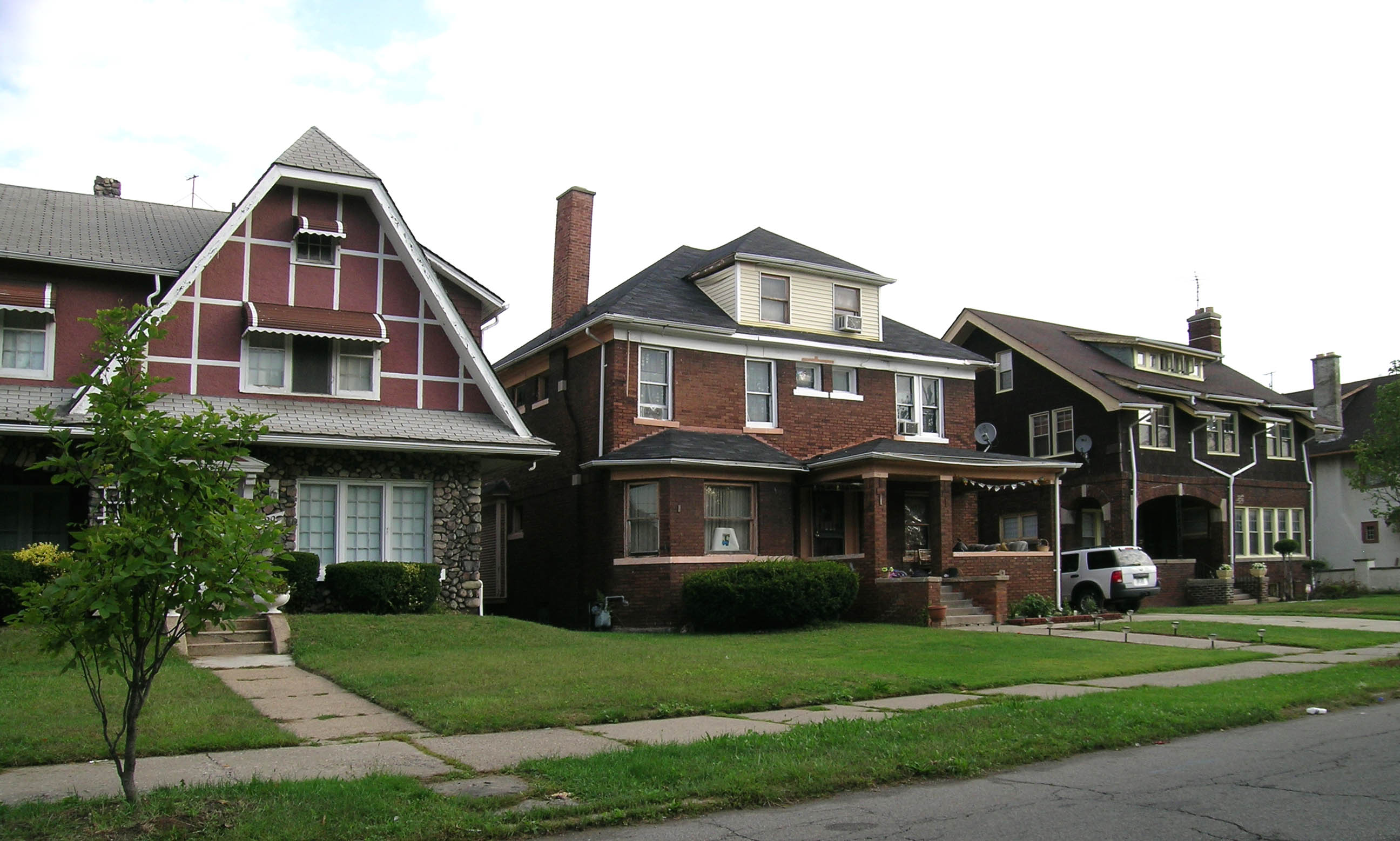
Homes on Colorado Street

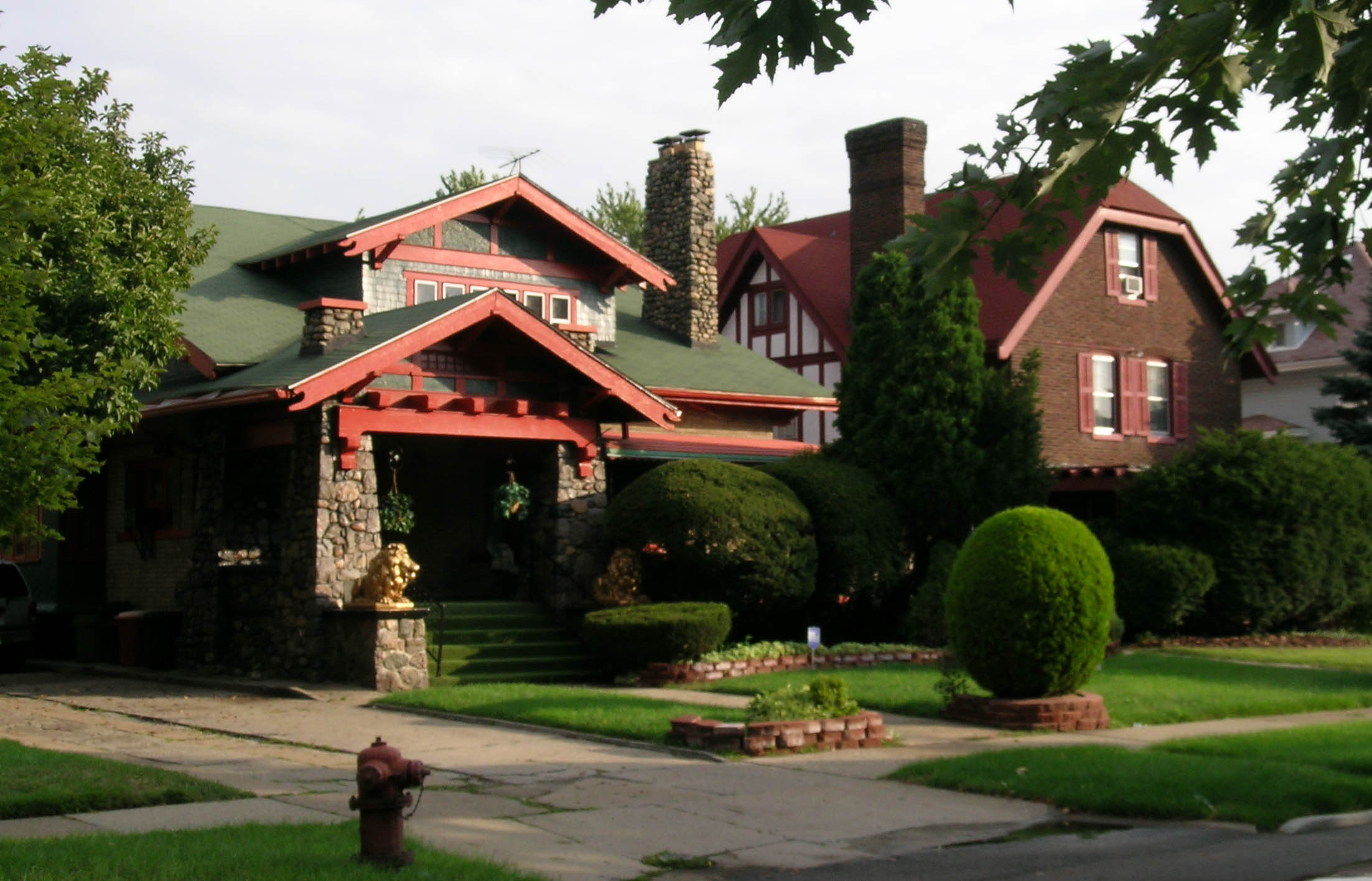
Homes on McLean Street near Woodward Avenue
