= Warrendale, Detroit =

Coordinates: 42.3469°N 83.2275°W

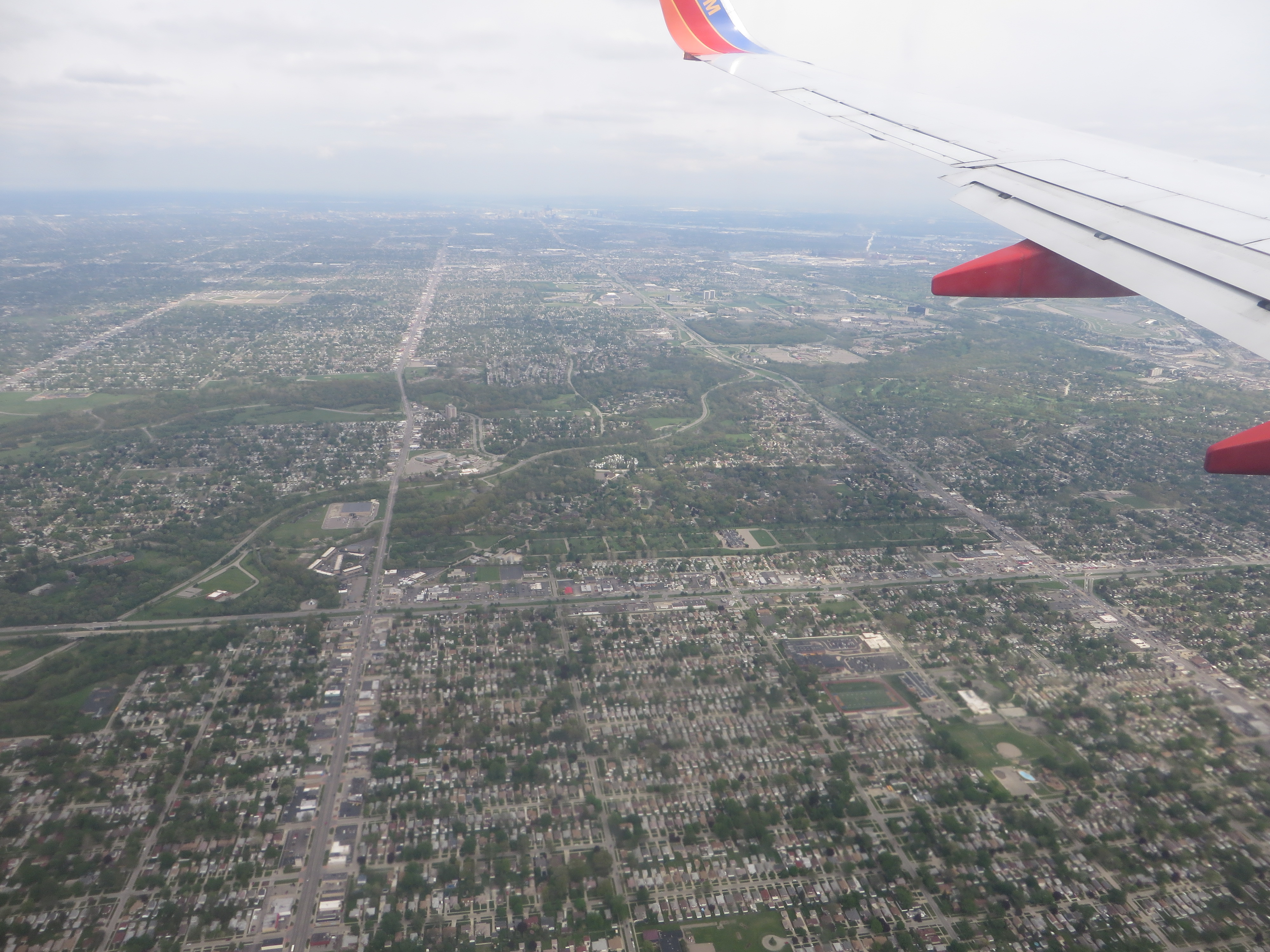
Aerial view of Warrendale and surrounding areas, looking east

Warrendale is a neighborhood located in Detroit, Michigan, bordered by Greenfield Road, Joy Road, and the Detroit city limits. Warrendale neighbors Dearborn on two sides and Dearborn Heights on another side.

== History ==
The community was previously the Village of Warrendale. In the early 1900s the residents voted for annexation so they could become a part of the Detroit water system.

== Cityscape ==
As of 2002 the majority of the houses were built before the 1960s. Most houses in Warrendale, as of 2006, had been constructed in the 1940s. Some houses remaining had been built by the start of the 20th century. Frank Nemecek of Model D states that the early 20th Century houses "help add to the historic character of Warrendale." Many of the housing consists of one story houses and wood frame bungalows.

== Demographics ==
As of 2002, according to MapInfo Corp., Warrendale had 23,290 residents.

As of 2006, according to the U.S. Census Bureau, the community is 34% White and 34% Black. While people from the Middle East and North Africa (MENA) make up a substantial amount of the population, the U.S. Census does not currently offer a MENA designation. While some Arab people will choose to mark "other," some mark "white." There is currently a movement as of 2018 in the Dearborn and broader Southeast Michigan area to add "MENA" to the Census. This would ensure that people in the neighborhoods like Warrendale are accurately represented.

As of 2005, there is a group of Arab Americans in Warrendale, most of them being Iraqi.

== Education ==
Warrendale is zoned to Detroit Public Schools. Elementary schools within Warrendale serving portions of Warrendale include Ann Arbor Trail, Carver, Dixon, and Gardner. In addition Henderson/Jemison, outside Warrendale, serves a portion for elementary school. Carver, Dixon, and Henderson/Jemison serve portions of the community for middle school. All residents are zoned to Frank Cody High School, outside Warrendale.

Dixon Elementary is adjacent to the western end of Rouge Park. It previously occupied a different building but took over the former Lessenger building in 2010.

As of 2013 the approximately 320 students at Gardner belonged to various ethnic groups: about 40% were African-American, another 40% were Middle Eastern, and 10% were Hispanic and Latino. The Middle Eastern students had origins from Iraq, Lebanon, Palestine, and Yemen. The Hispanic students originated from Mexico, the Dominican Republic, and Venezuela. Some students at Gardner originated from Nigeria.

Warrendale Charter Academy, a charter school operated by National Heritage Academies, is in Warrendale. Prior to the opening of the charter school, the Saints Peter and Paul Catholic School of the Roman Catholic Archdiocese of Detroit occupied the building.

=== History of schools ===
The Detroit Public Schools school board closed Leslie Elementary School in Warrendale in 1985. In 1992 the Detroit Board of Education voted to move Malcolm X Academy, an "African-centered" curriculum school, into the former Leslie school. Malcolm X had 470 students, one of whom was white. The move prompted a protest from the community, which at the time was a majority White working class community. At the time the nearest elementary school in the immediate area, George Washington Carver Elementary School, was overcrowded.

Warrendale residents objected to the idea that the Detroit Public Schools would divert funds and basic services to the Malcolm X Academy, which would be a mostly middle class school, and argued that the board should instead focus on its own overcrowded local school. Marc Christensen of the Metro Times said that the controversy lead outsiders to brand Warrendale as a racist area "because of their unprofessional speech, and because they couldn't control how other people thought the "whiteness" of their neighborhood mattered." He explained that the scenario therefore became "a nightmare." John Hartigan, Jr. wrote about the controversy in one chapter of his book Racial Situations: Class Predicaments of Whiteness in Detroit, published by Princeton University Press. Police officers escorted the Malcolm X students to school due to perceived dangers.

Other zoned elementary schools previously serving Warrendale include Kosciuscko Elementary School, Lessenger K-8, and the standalone Jemison Elementary School. Zoned middle schools previously serving Warrendale include Lessenger Middle School and Ruddiman Middle School; Lessenger later became Lessenger K-8.

== Parks and recreation ==
The 1,181-acre (478 ha) Rouge Park is in Warrendale. It is twice the size of Belle Isle.
