= Bela Hubbard =

American lawyer

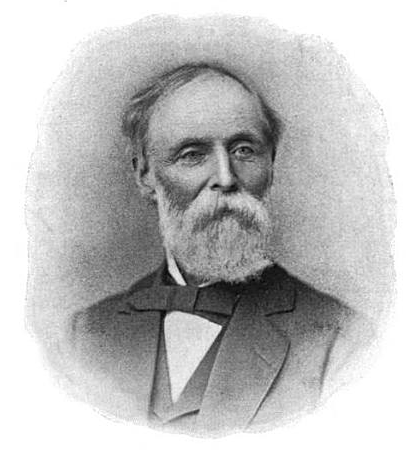
- Bela Hubbard
- Born: April 23, 1814; Hamilton, New York
- Died: June 13, 1896 (aged 82); Michigan
- Citizenship: United States
- Education: Hamilton College
- Known for: Memorials of a Half Century in Michigan and the Lake Regions

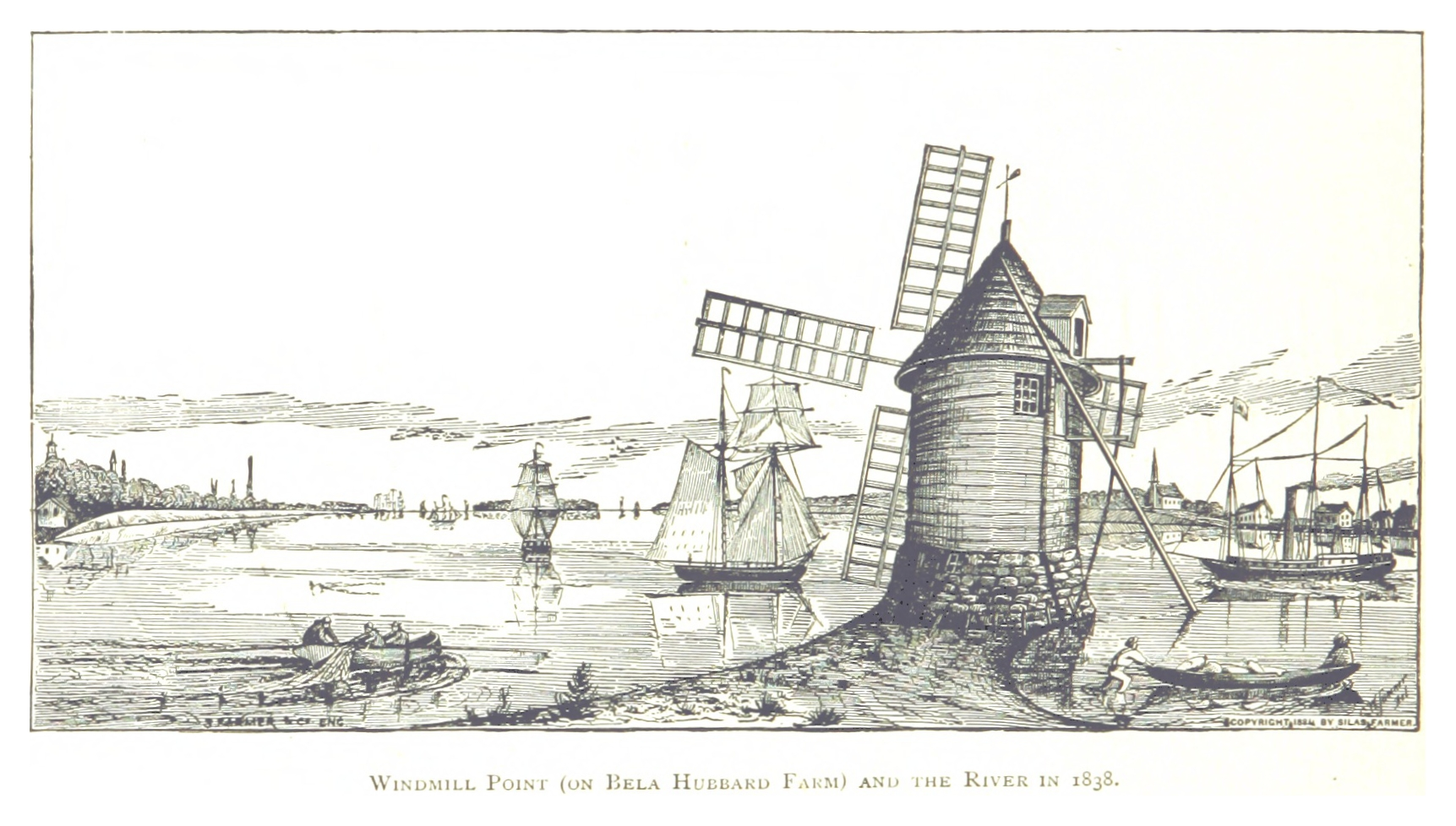
Windmill Point at Bela Hubbards farm in 1838

Bela Hubbard residence, "Vinewood", Alexander Jackson Davis, Architect. Built 1856. Demolished 1933. Detroit, Michigan

Bela Hubbard (April 23, 1814 – June 13, 1896) was a 19th-century naturalist, geologist, writer, historian, surveyor, explorer, lawyer, real estate dealer, lumberman and civic leader of early Detroit, Michigan, United States. Hubbard is noted as one of the pioneer geologists of Michigan starting with expeditions undertaken, while in his twenties, with Michigan's geologist Douglass Houghton. These early expeditions explored the salt springs of Michigan's Grand and Saginaw river valleys. Later, Hubbard surveyed many of the regions around Lake Superior, Lake Michigan and Lake Huron.

== Biography ==
Bela Hubbard, second son of Phebe and Thomas Hill Hubbard was born in Hamilton, New York. He graduated from Hamilton College in 1834, and in the spring of 1835 moved to Detroit, Michigan, to help manage the family's farm and land agency.

Hubbard was quick-deeded ownership of the two-hundred-and-fifty acre Knaggs farm at Springwells on the river southwest of Detroit. It had been purchased by his father the year before. For several years both Bela and Henry Hubbard, an older sibling who had arrived in Detroit the year previous, stayed in the old Knagg's farmhouse. Bela Hubbard used his farm not solely as a means of production but to apply scientific principles towards the advancement of agriculture.

In 1837, after the Michigan Legislature established a geological survey to conduct a study of the state's natural resources, the state geologist, Douglass Houghton, appointed Hubbard his assistant. Hubbard served the Geological Survey from 1837 to 1841. Major field work undertaken by Hubbard for the survey included a coast survey of the Lake Huron and Michigan shores of the Lower Peninsula, done with Houghton in 1838; surveys of Wayne and Monroe counties, also in 1838; and a survey of the Lake Superior coast and the copper region of Keweenaw Point with Houghton, in 1840. After 1840 the work of the Geological Survey was reduced, and Hubbard left the agency.

At the conclusion of the State Survey he studied law and was admitted to the bar in 1842.

In 1843 Houghton proposed that the U.S. land survey of the Upper Peninsula be combined with the state geological survey of the area. The following summer he contracted to perform the combined surveys. After Houghton's death in the fall of 1845, the surveys he had contracted to do were taken over by Hubbard and others. Hubbard surveyed the Huron Mountains area of Marquette and Baraga Counties with William Ives in 1845 and 1846. He also surveyed parts of Houghton and Ontonagon Counties in those years with Sylvester Higgins. Also in 1846 Hubbard edited and published with William Austin Burt a report on the copper region based on Houghton's notes from his 1845 survey.

On March 2, 1848, he married Sarah Eliza Baughman of Detroit, daughter of Rev. John A. and Sarah (Harvey) Baughman at Adrian, Michigan. She was 16 years old at the time.

Country estates were of considerable interest to Hubbard. He consulted Andrew Jackson Downing's works on the subject and became enamored with the author's philosophy of country living in a romantic villa surrounded by semi-natural parks and gardens.

In 1853 Hubbard contracted with famed New York architect Alexander Jackson Davis to design several homes. Davis advised Hubbard to visit Llewellyn Park, a garden suburb that was one of the nation's first planned communities, and to inspect Haskell's Italian villa. These meetings resulted in the Vinewood estates, in which three Italianate homes were built on a rise 1/4 mile above the Detroit River. These were the Baughman-Scotten House, first occupied by Hubbard's in laws and later sold to Daniel Scotten, the Reeve House belonging to lumberman Christopher Reeve, and Vinewood, Hubbard's estate. Vinewood, after having been deeded to Grace Hospital in Detroit in 1913 and made the Miriam Memorial Branch, was demolished in 1933.

After 1854 Hubbard gave his chief attention to real estate and the lumber trade. Remaining interested in the agriculture of his adopted State he was made Trustee of the Agricultural Society, which in 1849 drafted a memorial and read by Hubbard to the Michigan legislature, calling for a State Agricultural College and Model Farm which was adopted in 1855 and is now Michigan State University. He was also a Trustee of the State Asylums for the Insane and for the Deaf and Dumb and served as trustee of the Detroit Museum of Art, a precursor to the Detroit Institute of Arts. He donated a significant amount of land to the City of Detroit to serve as the Western Boulevard which is now West Grand Boulevard, a major thoroughfare in the city of Detroit. He was also a strong proponent of the acquisition of Belle Isle by the City of Detroit as a public park. He authored many scientific, literary, and historical papers, and in 1888 published a volume entitled "Memorials of a Half Century in Michigan and the Lake Regions". In 1892 he received the honorary degree of LL.D. from his alma mater, Hamilton College. There is a residence hall at Michigan State University named in his honor.

Hubbard died in 1896, and is buried in Elmwood Cemetery, Detroit.
