= Cadillac Centre =

Proposed complex in downtown Detroit, Michigan

- An artist's rendering of the proposed Cadillac Centre
- Interactive map of the Cadillac Centre area

General information
- Status: Never built
- Type: Commercial offices Residential
- Architectural style: Postmodern; Deconstructivist
- Location: Campus Martius; Detroit, Michigan
- Coordinates: 42°19′55″N 83°02′44″W

Technical details
- Floor count: Two 24-story towers and a 12-story base.

Design and construction
- Architects: Anthony Caradonna; AC/2 Studio
- Developer: Northern Group Inc.

Cadillac Centre was a proposed contemporary complex to be constructed in downtown Detroit, Michigan on the Monroe block of Campus Martius. In January 2008, the city announced that the complex was approved for construction with groundbreaking planned for September 2009, but the project was placed on hold indefinitely due to an economic recession. Expected to cost $150-million, the mixed-use development called for two 24-story towers to rise from a 12-story base which would connect to the 40-story Cadillac Tower. The upscale residential high-rise was slated to include a retail and entertainment complex. The architect was Anthony Caradonna, an associate professor with Pratt Institute School of Architecture in New York City and a principal with the AC/2 Studio firm, whose recent projects have included the Hotel Duomo in Molfetta, Italy and the Bar Solex in New York City.

The Detroit Free Press reported in early October 2008 that the New York–based developers were having trouble meeting their deadline, and the Detroit Economic Growth Corp rejected a revised $40 million proposal described as a "dressed-up parking garage" by DEGC President George W. Jackson. Failing to meet the standards of the DEGC, the project was put on hold indefinitely.

== Impact ==
Styled in the postmodern architectural genre known as deconstructivism, the $150-million Cadillac Center was expected to have a profound impact on development in downtown Detroit as a mixed-use residential and commercial complex. Anthony Caradonna's steel-glass design for Cadillac Centre, reminiscent of the Guggenheim Museum Bilbao, was slated to face Campus Martius Park, a central gathering place in downtown Detroit. Developer Northern Group was the then owner of Detroit's Penobscot Building, First National Building, and Cadillac Tower. The existing Gothic-Revival Cadillac Tower would have connected with and incorporated the new Cadillac Centre. The futuristic Cadillac Centre would have been constructed on Detroit's historic Monroe block, once a collection of eight antebellum commercial buildings demolished in 1989.

== Architect ==
The architect of record is Anthony Caradonna, a faculty member at the Pratt Institute School of Architecture and a principal with the firm of OPUS Architecture and Design Studios based in New York City and Rome, Italy. He is a graduate of the Pratt Institute and the Harvard University Graduate School of Design. His recent projects include the Hotel Duomo in Molfetta, Italy and the Bar Solex in New York City He earned a medal of merit from the American Institute of Architects in 1986.

== See also ==
- Cadillac Tower
- Campus Martius Park
