= Michigan Soldiers' and Sailors' Monument =

- U.S. National Register of Historic Places
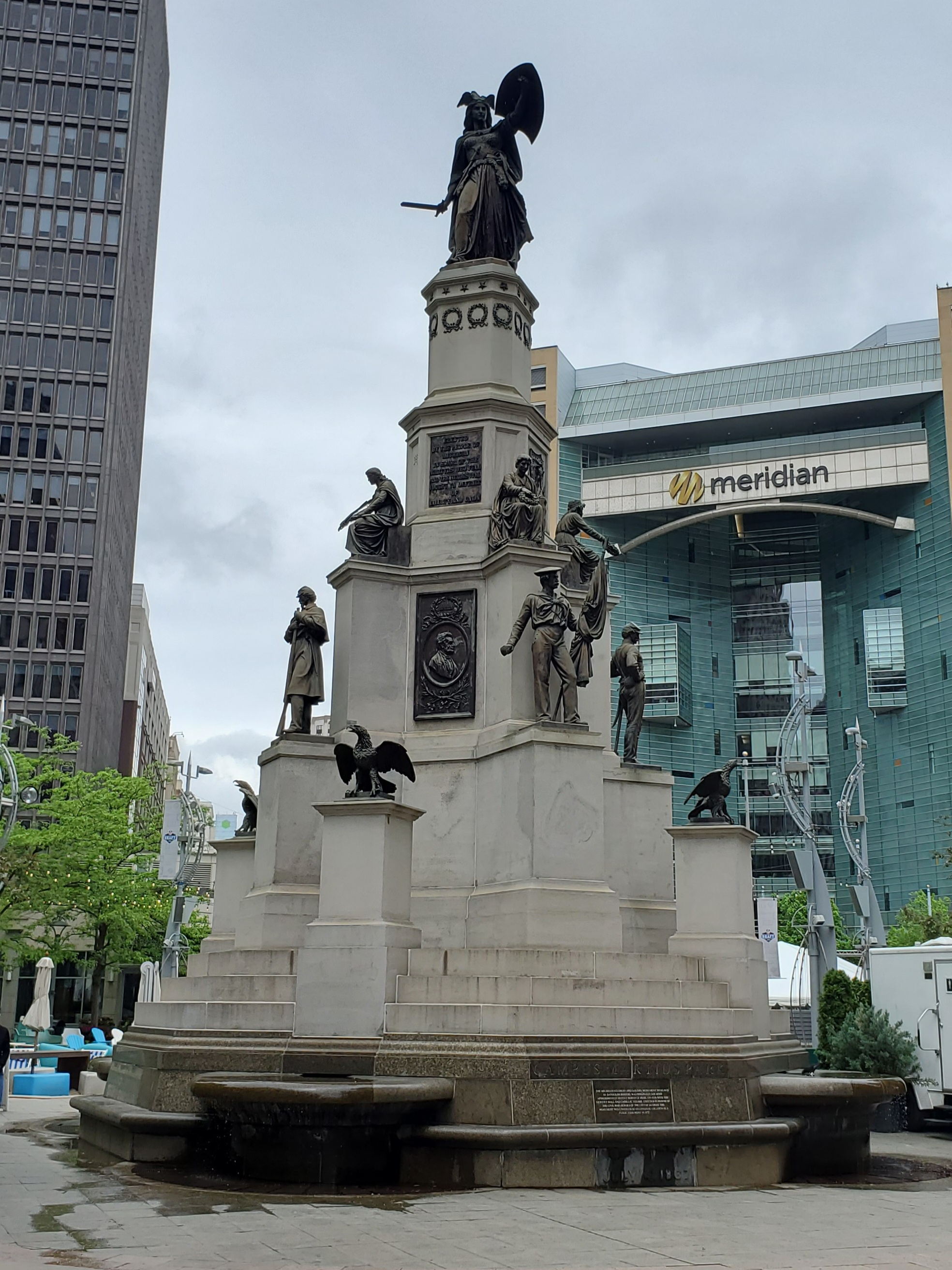
- The monument in 2022
- Interactive map
- Location: Campus Martius Park; Detroit, Michigan
- Coordinates: 42°19′54″N 83°2′48″W
- Built: 1867
- Architect: Randolph Rogers; Alexander Chapoton
- Architectural style: Classical Revival
- NRHP reference No.: 84001862
- Added to NRHP: May 31, 1984

The Michigan Soldiers' and Sailors' Monument is a Civil War monument located in Downtown Detroit, Michigan. This example of civic sculpture stands in a prominent location on the southeast tip of Campus Martius Park, where five principal thoroughfares—Michigan Avenue, Monroe Street, Cadillac Square, Fort Street, and Woodward Avenue—convene on the reconstructed traffic circle in front of One Campus Martius Building. It was listed on the National Register of Historic Places in 1984.

== History ==
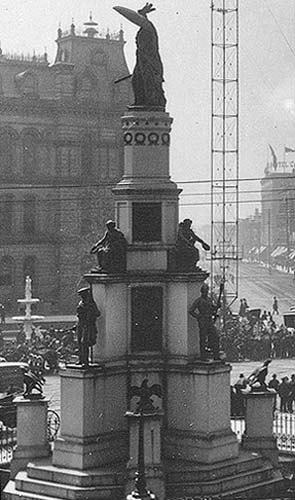
Michigan Soldiers' and Sailors' Monument with the old Detroit City Hall in the background

In 1865, the Michigan Soldiers' and Sailors' Monument Association was established by Governor Austin Blair in order to collect funds for a monument commemorating Michigan's sailors and soldiers killed during the Civil War. Voluntary subscriptions from citizens were collected and sculptor Randolph Rogers, who had created similar Civil War commemorative monuments in Ohio and Rhode Island, was chosen as the artist for the monument. The state's foremost Civil War monument was unveiled on April 9, 1872. Attending the dedication were Generals George Armstrong Custer, Philip H. Sheridan and Ambrose E. Burnside.

In 2005 a re-dedication ceremony was held following the completion of the new Campus Martius plaza in downtown Detroit. The time capsule contained in the monument was opened, and the list of Michigan War Dead was updated to reflect all those killed from the Civil War up to April 2005 in Iraq and Afghanistan. Civil War re-enactors, descendant organizations of the Grand Army of the Republic, representatives from the Detroit City Council, the Michigan National Guard, and the Second Baptist Church men's choir participated in the ceremony.

The Michigan Soldiers' and Sailors' Monument is situated within the traffic circle of the intersection of Woodward Avenue, Michigan Avenue, Monroe Street, Fort Street, and Cadillac Square. The property is open to the public. The monument was repositioned on Campus Martius Park traffic circle for the restoration of the park.

== Description ==
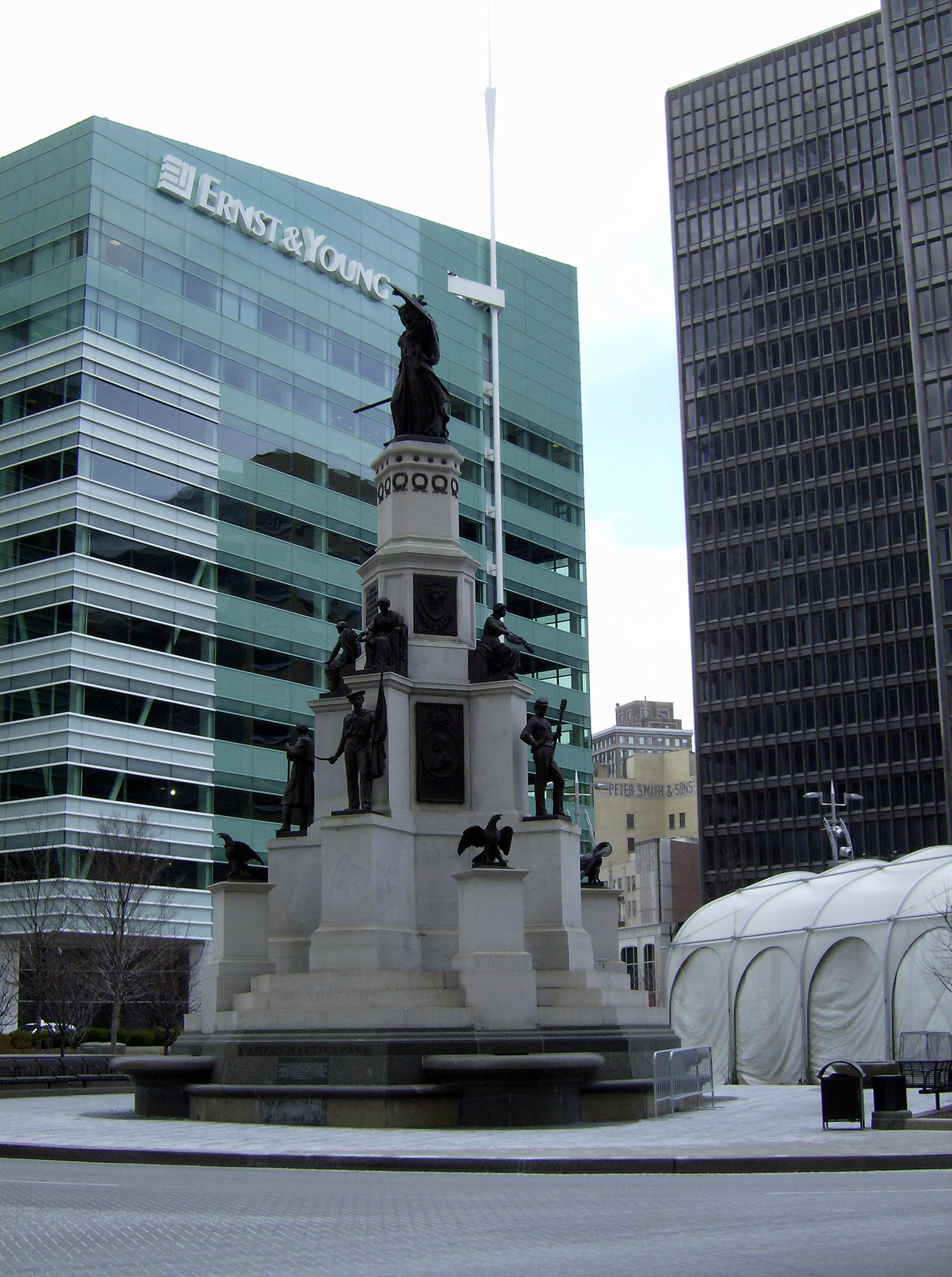
One Kennedy Square (left) and 1001 Woodward (right) behind the Michigan Soldiers' and Sailors' Monument

Rogers' design consists of a series of octagonal sections that rise up from the base of the monument. The lowest sections are topped by eagles with raised wings that guide the eye upward to the next section which is surmounted by four male figures depicting the Navy, Infantry, Cavalry, and Artillery branches of the United States Army. Four female allegorical figures, resting on pedestals, are above the male statues and represent Victory, History, Emancipation, and Union were not added to the monument until 1881. Local lore claims Rogers used Sojourner Truth, the famous African-American abolitionist, as his inspiration for the Emancipation statue, but little evidence exists to document this belief. There are also four plaques containing bas-reliefs of the Union leaders Lincoln, Grant, Sherman, and Farragut. Capping the monument, the heroic "Amazon figure" Michigania, or Victory, brandishes a sword in her right hand and in her other she raises a shield, prepared for attack.

== See also ==
- Architecture of metropolitan Detroit
