= Cadillac Tower =

Skyscraper in Detroit

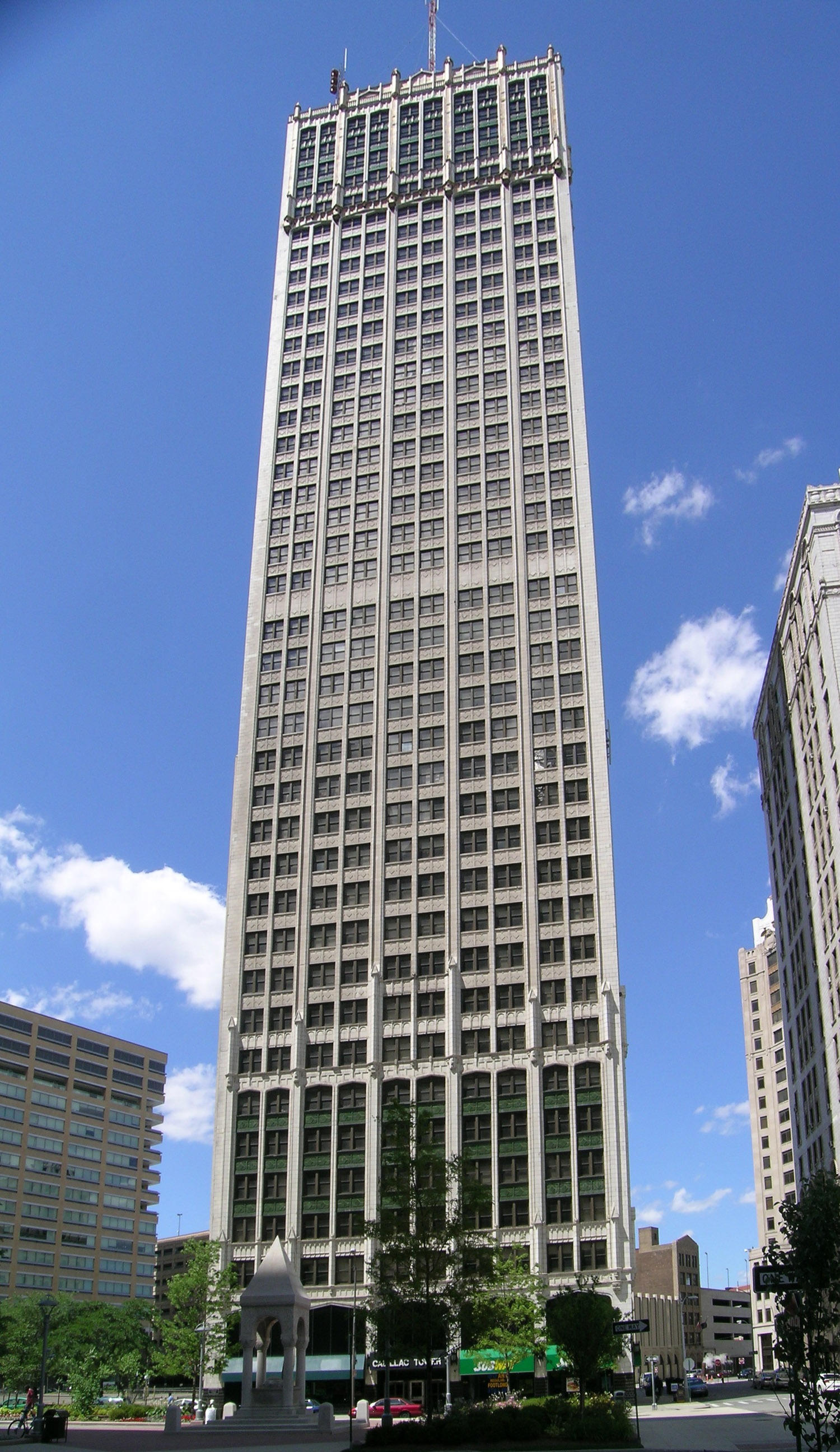
- Former names: Barlum Tower

General information
- Type: Commercial offices
- Coordinates: 42.331976°N 83.044893°W
- Owner: Bedrock Detroit

Height
- Antenna spire: 176.2 m (578 ft)
- Roof: 133.4 m (438 ft)

Technical details
- Floor count: 40; 2 below ground
- Floor area: 31,773 m^{2} (342,000 sq ft)
- Barlum Tower
- U.S. National Register of Historic Places
- Location: 65 Cadillac Square; Detroit, Michigan
- Built: 1927
- Built by: Otto Misch Co.
- Architects: Bonnah & Chaffee
- Architectural style: Neo-Gothic, Chicago School
- NRHP reference No.: 05000737
- Added to NRHP: July 27, 2005

The Cadillac Tower is a 40-story, 133.4 m (438 ft) Neo-Gothic skyscraper designed by the architectural firm of Bonnah & Chaffee at 65 Cadillac Square in downtown Detroit, Michigan. The building's materials include terra cotta and brick. It was built in 1927 as Barlum Tower. At the top of the tower is a tall guyed mast for local radio stations WMXD, WLLZ and television station WLPC-CD. It was listed on the National Register of Historic Places in 2005.

== History ==
Cadillac Tower was the first building outside New York City and Chicago to have 40 floors, including two below ground. The building also houses the city of Detroit's Planning and Development Department, and its Recreation Department. Cadillac Tower's decorative cornices and parapets are of varying heights. The corner spires rise to a height of 130 m (430 ft), and the spires at the middle façade rise to the same height of the mechanical penthouse at 133.4 m (438 ft).

Nine years before the Cadillac Tower was constructed, the 20-storey Cadillac Square Building was built in the adjacent plot. This is why relatively few windows were installed on the west side of the Cadillac Tower. The Cadillac Square Building was demolished in the 1970s.

From 1994 to 2000, one side of the building featured a 14-story mural of Detroit Lions star player Barry Sanders. The mural was retired after a six-year deal with Nike expired. That mural was then replaced with one of Detroit Red Wings star Steve Yzerman. Currently the building features an ad for the MGM Grand Detroit Casino featuring a lion.

In January 2008, the City of Detroit and Cadillac Tower's owner Northern Group, Inc., announced plans for Cadillac Centre, a $150-million mixed-use residential entertainment-retail complex attached to the skyscraper. Designed by architect Anthony Caradonna, the contemporary steel and glass 24-story center would have filled in the currently vacant Monroe Block adjacent to Campus Martius. This project was put on indefinite hold ultimately being replaced by Meridian Health Plan's future headquarters.

In November 2021, Bedrock, a real estate firm owned by mega-developer Dan Gilbert, purchased the tower. Plans have not been disclosed whether it will be a standalone project or be incorporated into a redevelopment of the Monroe Blocks.

== Gallery ==
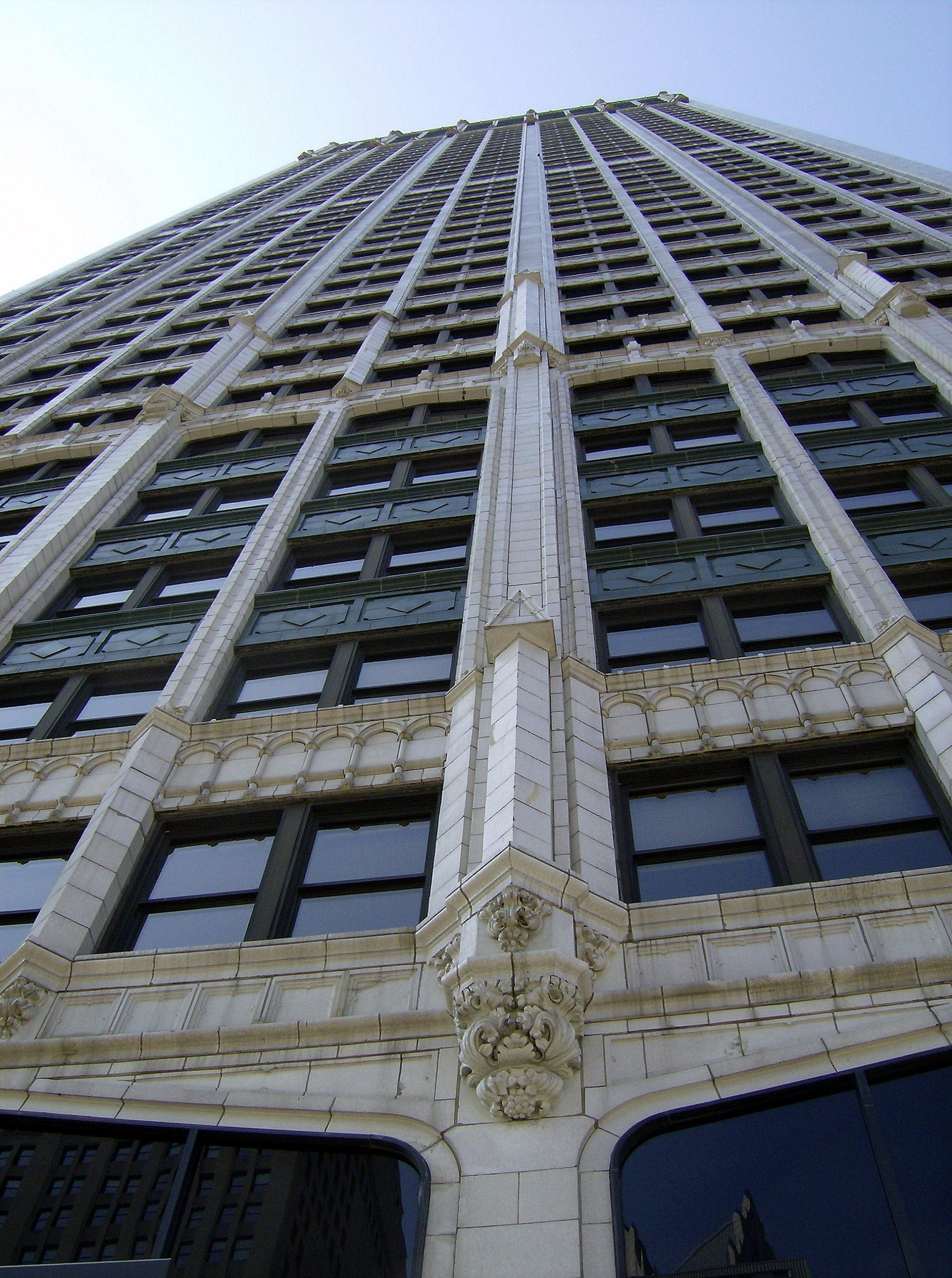
Looking up from Cadillac Square

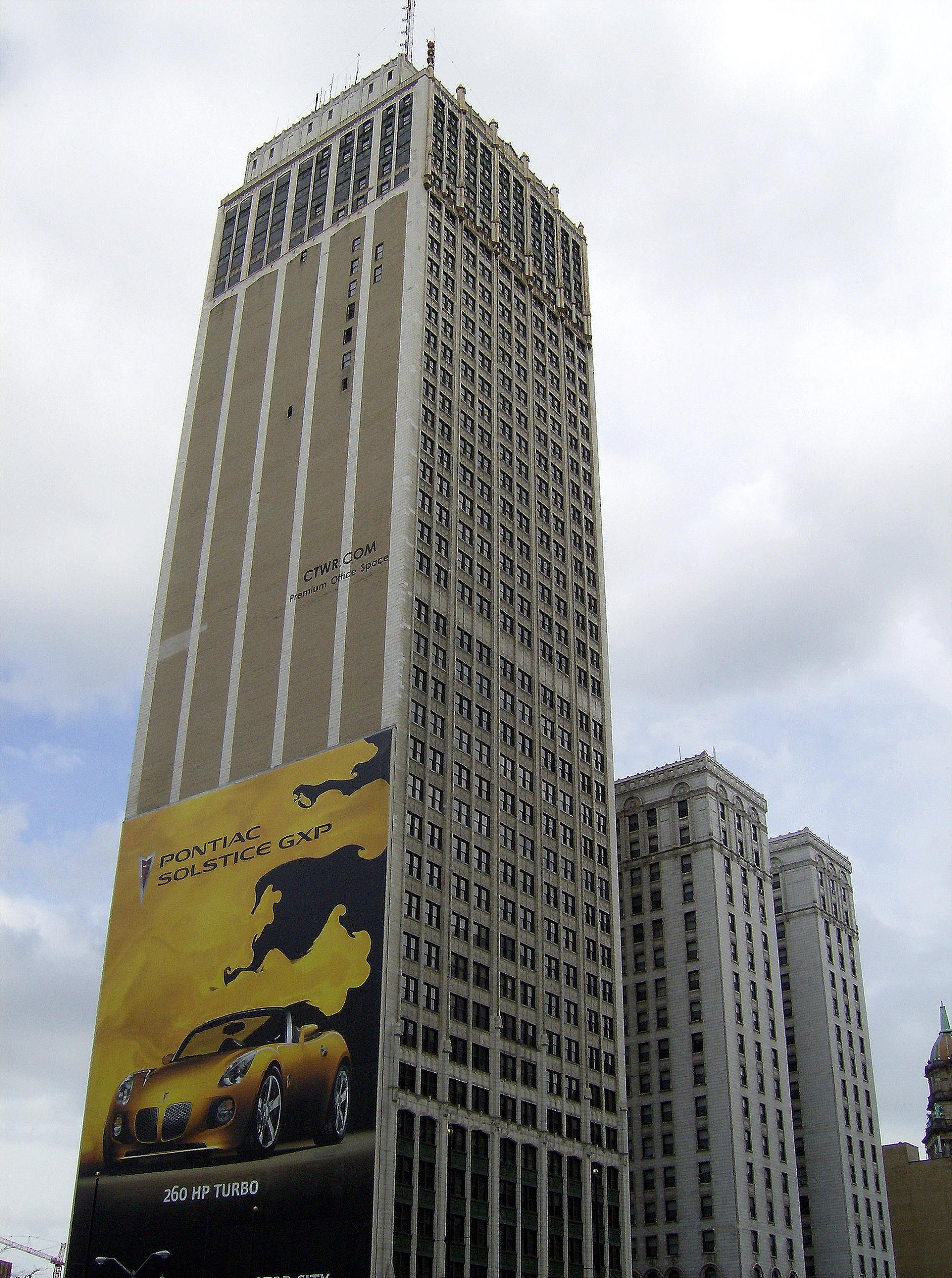

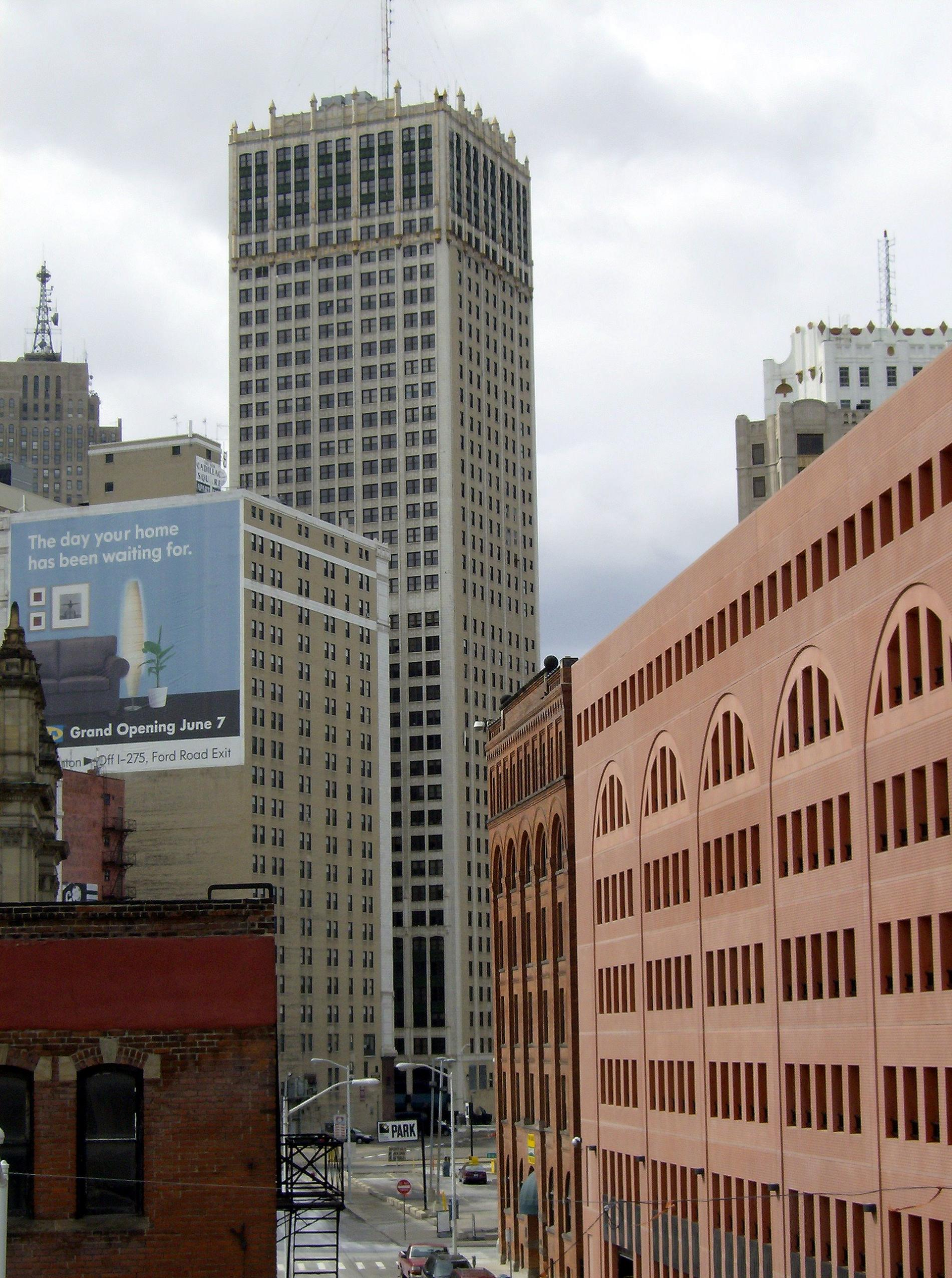
Cadillac Tower from Greektown

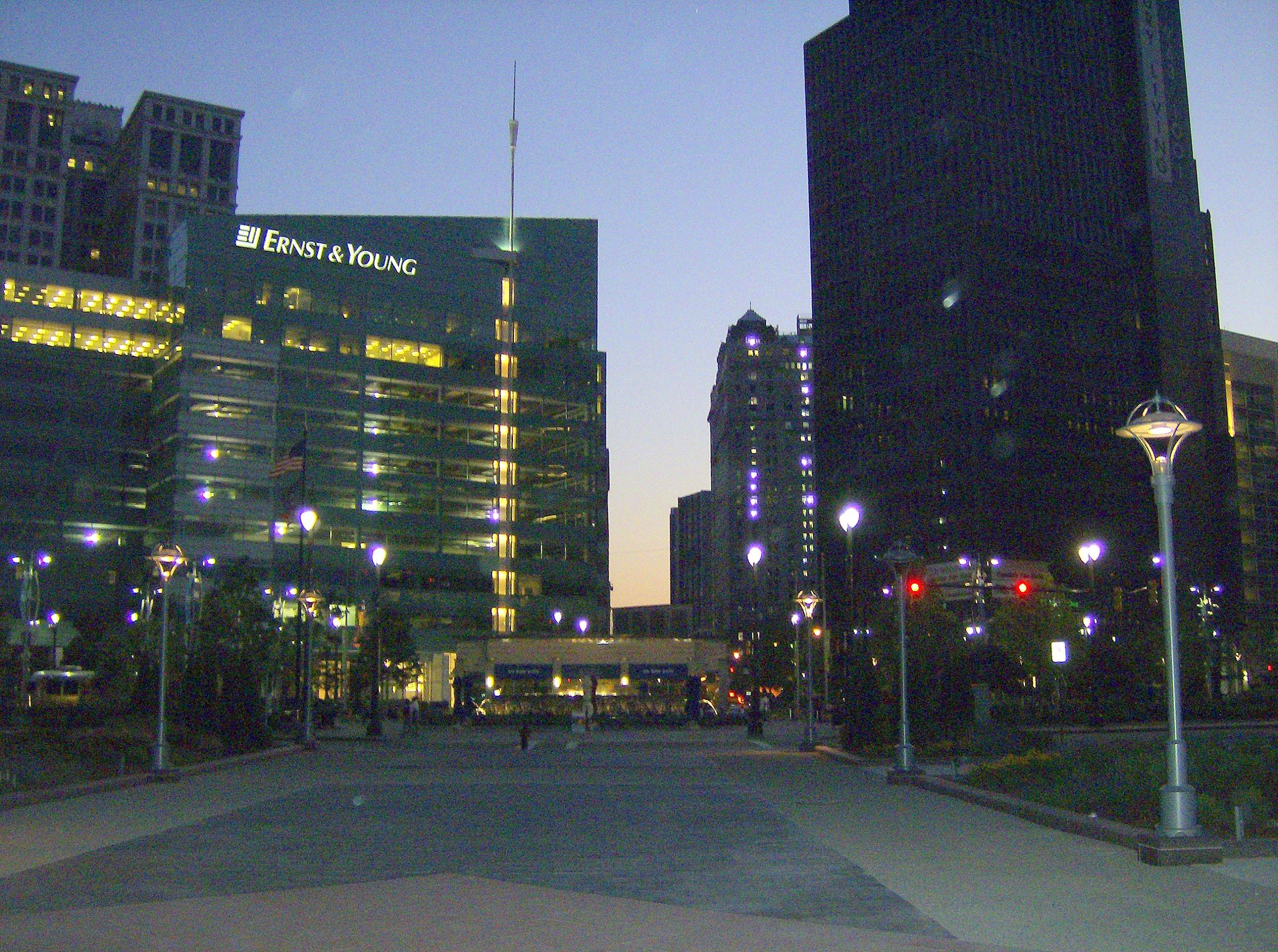
Cadillac Square

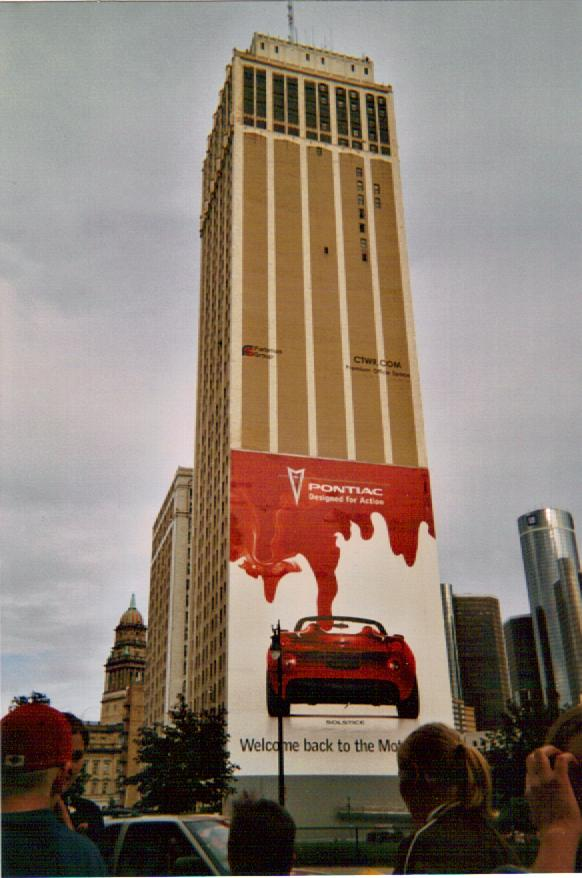

== See also ==
- List of tallest buildings in Detroit
- Other buildings designed by Bonnah & Chaffee:
  - Lawyers Building
  - Merchants Building
