= Meridian Health Plan Headquarters =

Corporate campus

- Interactive map of the Meridian Health Plan Headquarters area

General information
- Status: Proposed
- Type: Medical offices
- Location: 32 Monroe St, Detroit, Michigan
- Coordinates: 42.33°N 83.045°W
- Construction started: Summer 2014
- Completed: Early 2017
- Cost: $111 Million USD (2013 Dollars)
- Owner: Meridian Health Plan

Technical details
- Floor count: 16
- Floor area: 230,000 sq ft (21,000 m^{2})

Design and construction
- Developer: Schostak Bros. & Co.

Meridian Health Plan Headquarters was a planned highrise in the Campus Martius district of downtown Detroit. The skyscraper would have had 16 stories with office space, ground level retail outlets, a state-of-the-art plaza, and a 9-story, 1,000 space parking deck. Detroit-based Meridian Health Plan would have been the sole office tenant in the 16-story building on the block bounded by Monroe, Bates and Farmer streets by Campus Martius Park. Meridian planned to occupy to 300,000 square feet of space in the $111 million development. Designs for the Class A building included first-floor retail space and a nine-story, 1,000-space parking deck.

The brownfield incentives would be for site preparation and infrastructure improvements at the 1.96-acre site, a 230-space surface parking lot. Meridian, which has about 620 employees in two downtown offices in One Kennedy Square, 777 Woodward Ave., and the Dan Gilbert-owned 1001 Woodward building, would move into its new headquarters in early 2017, according to Sean Cotton, the company's general counsel. By that time, the company expects to have 1,050 employees in Detroit. Meridian initiated the new building project and hired Livonia-based Schostak Bros. as the developer.

== Design and construction ==
The site of the building is currently an oddly shaped, 230-space parking lot. Special architectural elements included a "floating box" like element, which is said to be the site of a restaurant. Other elements included a levitating belt of ivy, which will span from the 9-story parking deck, through the plaza, and to the side of the building. The main developer of the mid-rise was Schostak Bros. & Co. construction, which is located in the nearby suburb of Livonia.
