= Derek Grier =

American pastor (born 1965)

Derek Grier (born May 28, 1965) is a nationally recognized clergyman and the founding pastor of Grace Church located in Dumfries, Virginia.

== Early life ==
Grier was born in Long Island, New York and went to Howard University from 1983 to 1988, where he studied business, and served as a campus minister. He later went on to earn a master of education degree from Regent University in Virginia Beach, Virginia. He also holds a doctorate in practical ministry from Wagner University in Pasadena, California, as well as an honorary doctorate from Beulah Heights University.

== Biography ==
Grier is a nationally recognized clergyman and the church's founding pastor. He is a mentor to Christian leaders and business owners and a prominent radio and television presence. Grier broadcasts locally in the Washington, D.C. market; nationwide weekly on BET, The Word Network, Hillsong Channel, Impact Network, and internationally on stations in South Africa, Ethiopia, and parts of Kenya.

Grier's uncompromising approach to preaching and teaching the gospel has helped him lead Grace Church in phenomenal growth. In 2013, the highly acclaimed Outreach Magazine listed Grace Church as one of the fastest growing churches in the nation and among the top 100 fastest growing of all churches. Again in 2014, Grace Church was listed in Outreach Magazine's annual “100 Fastest Growing Churches in America” as the 7th fastest growing church in the United States.

In 2008, Grier was ordained Bishop by the late Rev. Dr. Myles Munroe, an internationally renowned preacher from the Bahamas.

In 2008, he founded the Dumfries Youth Center (now the Grace Youth Center) as an extension of Grace Church, which has served hundreds of high-risk children in the Dumfries area.
