= Merchants Building =

- U.S. National Register of Historic Places
- U.S. Historic district – Contributing property
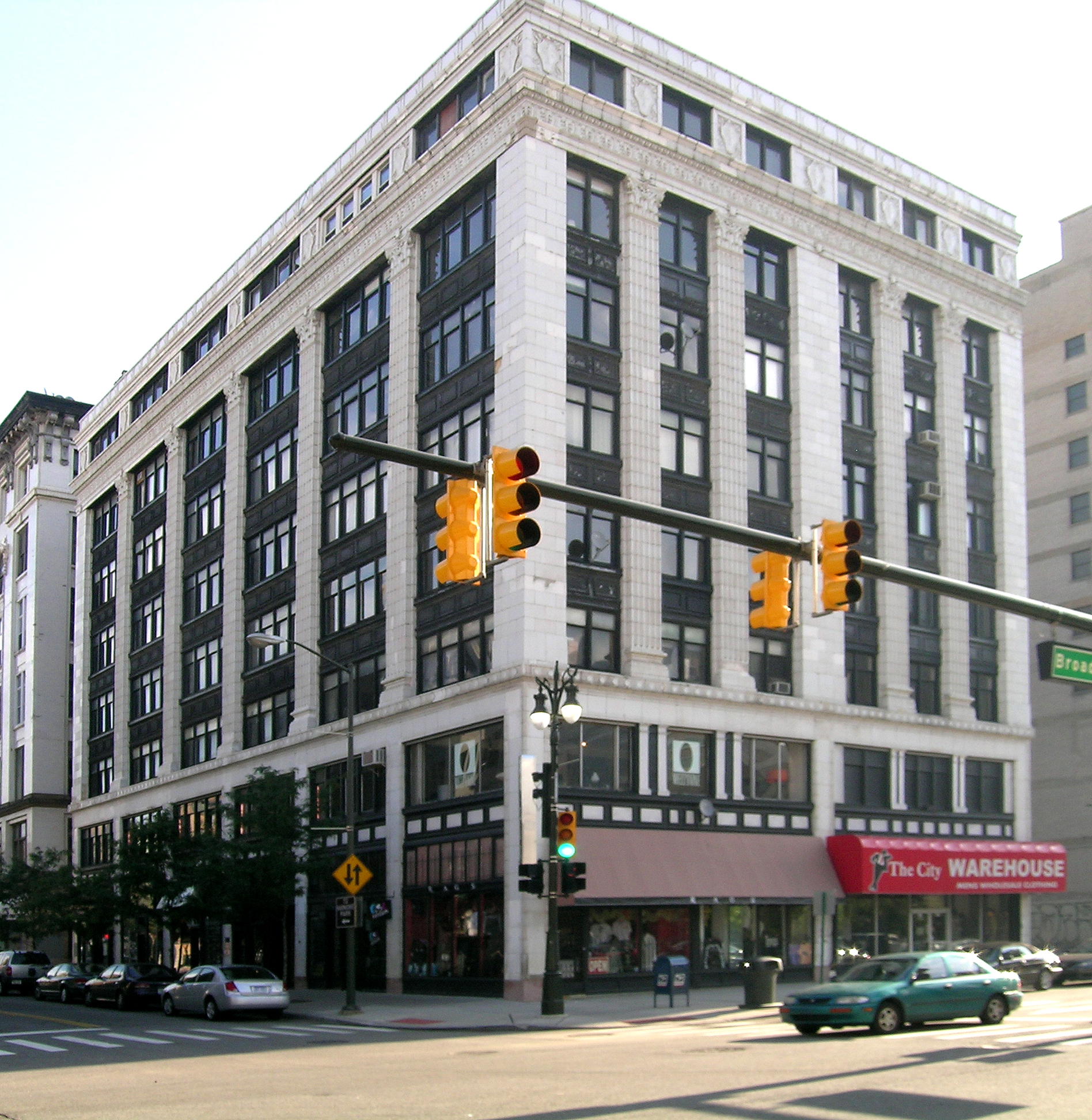
- Interactive map
- Location: 206 East Grand River Avenue; Detroit, Michigan
- Coordinates: 42°20′5″N 83°2′45″W
- Built: 1922
- Built by: Misch, Otto & Co.
- Architect: Bonnah & Chaffee
- Part of: Broadway Avenue Historic District (ID04000656)
- NRHP reference No.: 83003732
- Added to NRHP: November 25, 1983

The Merchants Building is a commercial building located at 206 East Grand River Avenue (at Broadway Street) in Downtown Detroit. It is also known as the Broadway Merchants Building. It was listed on the National Register of Historic Places in 1983.

== History ==
The Merchants Building was designed by Bonnah & Chaffee in 1922 for John Barlum (who also constructed the Barlum Tower). Throughout its history, the building has housed many business, including at least three furriers, Midwest Woolen Co., Kroger Grocery & Bakery, NY Life Insurance Co., a jeweler and shoe repair shop. The lowrise building was placed on the National Register of Historic Places on November 25, 1983.

== Description ==
The Merchants Building stands at 8 floors in height. It is built from steel and reinforced concrete, and wrapped with terra cotta. The façade is divided vertically into three sections: the bottom two stories are the storefront area, the middle five floors are divided by metal spandrel panels with raised panels, and the top floor windows are divided by terra cotta shields.

== See also ==
- Other buildings designed by Bonnah & Chaffee:

- Cadillac Tower
- Lawyers Building
