= One Kennedy Square =

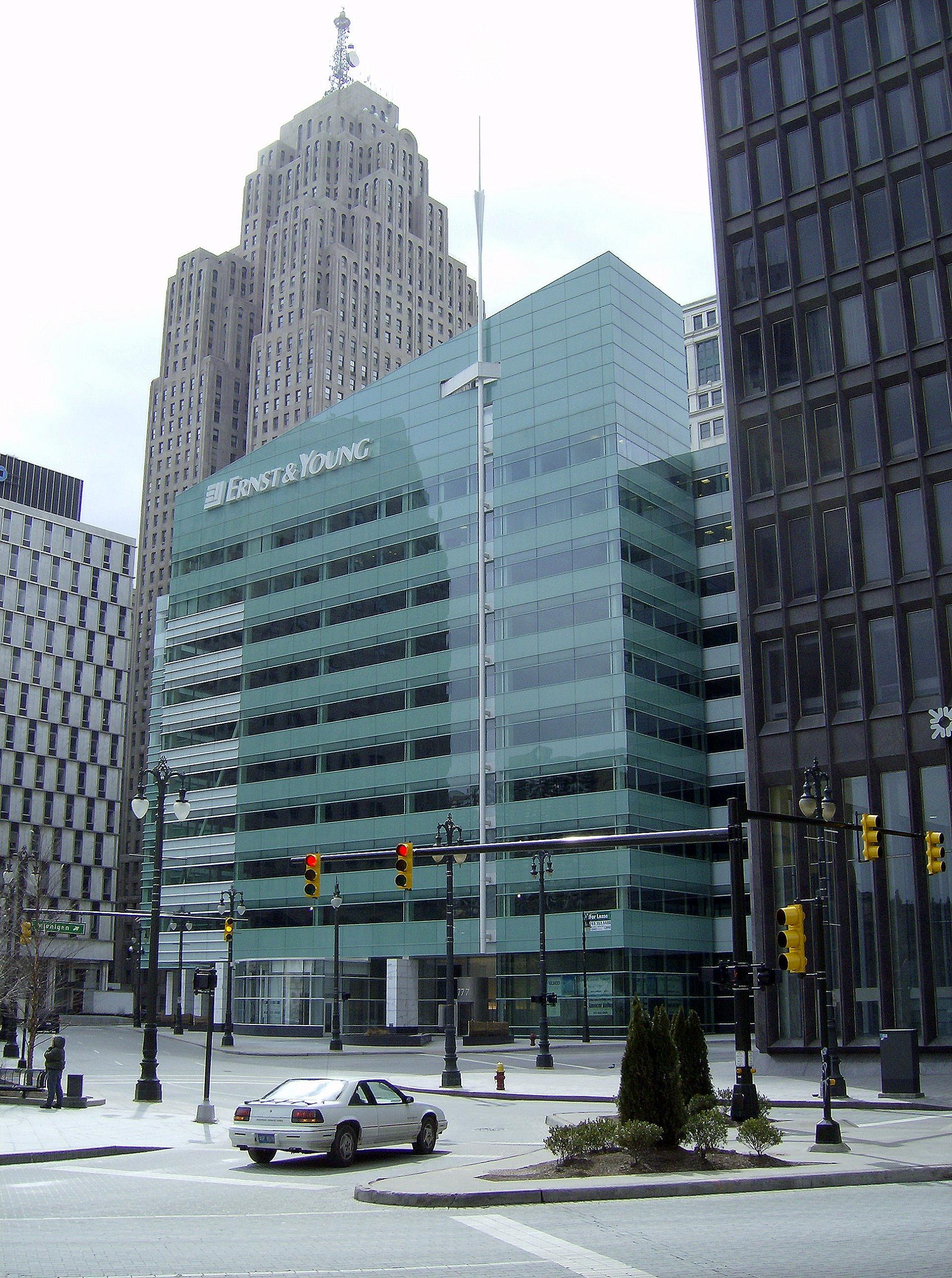
- Interactive map of the One Kennedy Square area

General information
- Type: Office
- Location: 777 Woodward Avenue; Detroit, Michigan 48226
- Coordinates: 42.3313°N 83.0474°W
- Construction started: 2005
- Completed: 2006
- Cost: $54 million
- Owner: REDICO

Height
- Antenna spire: 73.2 m (240 ft)
- Roof: 56 m (184 ft)

Technical details
- Floor count: 10
- Floor area: 23,627 m^{2} (254,320 sq ft)

Design and construction
- Architects: S. Kenneth Neumann; Neumann/Smith Architecture
- Developer: REDICO

Other information
- Public transit: Cadillac Center; Campus Martius

One Kennedy Square is a 10-story mid-rise office building in downtown Detroit, Michigan, United States. It is located adjacent to Campus Martius Park and the Detroit Financial District. Completed in 2006, it stands on the site that the original Detroit City Hall occupied from 1871-1961.

== History ==
One Kennedy Square is named after Kennedy Square, a former public plaza on the site with an underground parking garage, that opened in 1965. Before, the location was briefly Old City Hall Park, following the demolition of Detroit City Hall in 1961, which had been vacated after the city government moved to the City-County Building in 1954. Kennedy Square was primarily constructed of concrete, and included a fountain which fell into disrepair and was decommissioned in the 1970s.

The garage was partially demolished in 2001, and reconstructed with portions of the original walls and foundation, reopening in the fall of 2002. A proposal to build a mid-rise office building on the site was considered as early as 1996, and became integral to the redevelopment of Campus Martius Park in the 2000s.

In 2005, the Detroit Downtown Development Authority sold the development rights to the site to Southfield-based developer REDICO for $1, and leased the parking garage to REDICO. Construction on One Kennedy Square began in the spring of 2005 with little media coverage. Ernst & Young and Visteon were soon announced as its planned primary tenants. The building was completed in 2006 at a cost of $54 million, and the first tenants moved in during January 2007. Visteon never occupied the building, instead opting to sublease its space to other corporations.

== Description ==
=== Architecture ===
One Kennedy Square was designed by Neumann/Smith Architects (led by founder and principal S. Kenneth Neumann) in the Modern architectural style. Its exterior primarily consists of green tinted glass, topped by a spire, which is illuminated at night. The interior includes elements of marble.

=== Tenants ===
Ernst & Young has been a major tenant since 2007, occupying the top two floors; the exterior includes a large sign with the company's logo, near the top on the side facing Campus Martius. Other tenants include the Detroit Regional Chamber, construction firm Walbridge Aldinger, and the Detroit branch of Central Michigan University. At ground level, it includes a Starbucks, a Potbelly Sandwich Shop, and a branch of Citizens Bank.
