= Detroit City Hall =

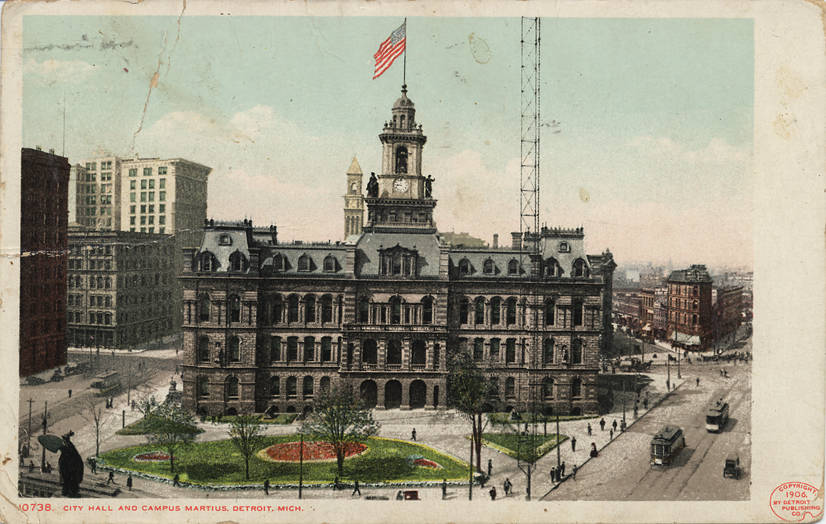
- A circa-1910s postcard depicting the old Detroit City Hall and Campus Martius
- Interactive map of the Detroit City Hall area

General information
- Status: Demolished
- Type: City Hall
- Location: Campus Martius; Detroit, Michigan
- Coordinates: 42.3304°N 83.0455°W
- Construction started: 1867
- Completed: 1871
- Demolished: 1961
- Owner: City of Detroit

Height
- Roof: 54.8 m (180 ft)

Technical details
- Floor count: 3

Design and construction
- Architect: James Anderson
- Main contractor: N. Osborn & Company

The Detroit City Hall was the seat of government for the city of Detroit, Michigan from 1871 to 1961. The building sat on the west side of Campus Martius bounded by Griswold Street to the west, Michigan Avenue to the north, Woodward Avenue to the east, and Fort Street to the south where One Kennedy Square stands today.

It stood three stories tall and included a partially raised basement level and an attic level. An observation level was at the top of the bell tower.

== History ==
Plans by architect James Anderson were complete in 1861, but construction was delayed because of restrictions for building materials during the Civil War. Constructed by the N. Osborn & Company of Rochester, New York, its foundation was laid in 1867, and the building finished construction in May 1871 at a total cost of $602,130. A dedicated ceremony for the new city hall was held on July 4, 1871.

Though just 20 years old, the building was first proposed for demolition in 1894 at the request of Detroit Mayor Hazen Pingree. It survived many other attempts to demolish it, but its fate was sealed after the City-County Building was constructed as the city and county's new seat of government in 1955. Though a poll by Survey Associated showed Detroiters favored preservation of the building 58% to 21%, the Common Council, with the support of Mayor Louis Miriani, voted five to four on January 17, 1961 to demolish the building. Preservationists took the fight to stop the demolition all the way up to the United States Supreme Court, but all requests for injunctions were denied.

Demolition began August 14 of that year and completed by September 18. The building's demolition concluded in September 1961 with the clock tower being the last piece of the building to be razed. An underground garage was constructed beneath the site to facilitate the construction of 1001 Woodward, and covered over by Kennedy Square, a concrete plaza with a fountain as its centerpiece. Kennedy Square was replaced by One Kennedy Square office building in 2005.

== Architecture ==
The Detroit City Hall was designed mainly in the Italian Renaissance revival architectural style, but during the design process, a French Second Empire mansard roof was added. It measured 200 feet in length by 90 feet in width, and the tower rose 180 feet tall. It was faced with mainly cream colored Amherst Sandstone. The building took 10 years to complete, mostly due to restrictions of material during the Civil War, but much had to do with city politicians fighting over the bids and contracts. The tower was reportedly built very poorly, and was plagued by problems its entire existence. The building was essentially a 'book end' for the old Wayne County Building that was on the other end of Campus Martius.

The building featured sculptures, commissioned by city resident and Michigan pioneer Bela Hubbard, of Fr. Gabriel Richard, Antoine Cadillac, Fr. Jacques Marquette and the Sieur de La Salle created by Julius T. Melchers and John Donaldson. When the building was demolished, the statues were saved. Some were moved to the campus of Wayne State University, while others sit in storage at Fort Wayne. The cannons from the Battle of Lake Erie, which had stood on the grounds, were moved to the Dossin Great Lakes Museum on Belle Isle. The stained-glass window, which stood in the council chambers on the third floor, was moved to the Detroit Historical Museum. The rubble from the building was used to construct parts of the Jefferson Beach Marina in St. Clair Shores.

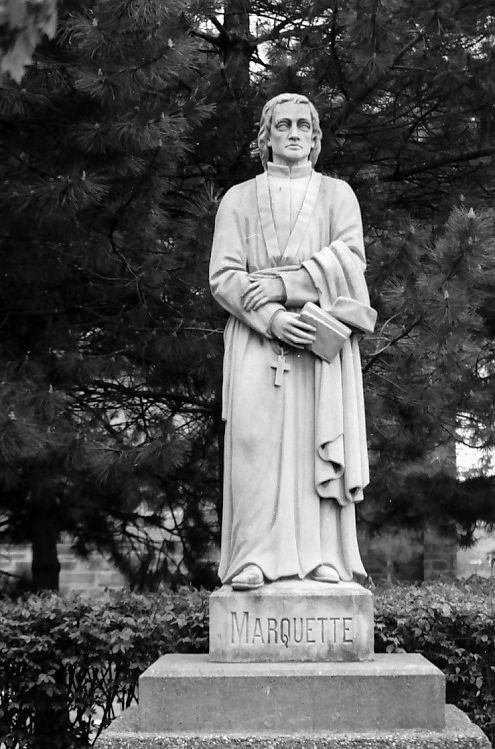
Marquette

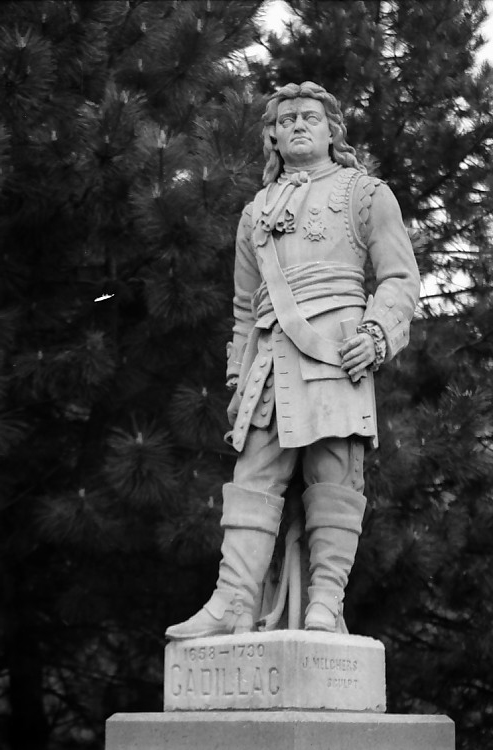
Cadillac

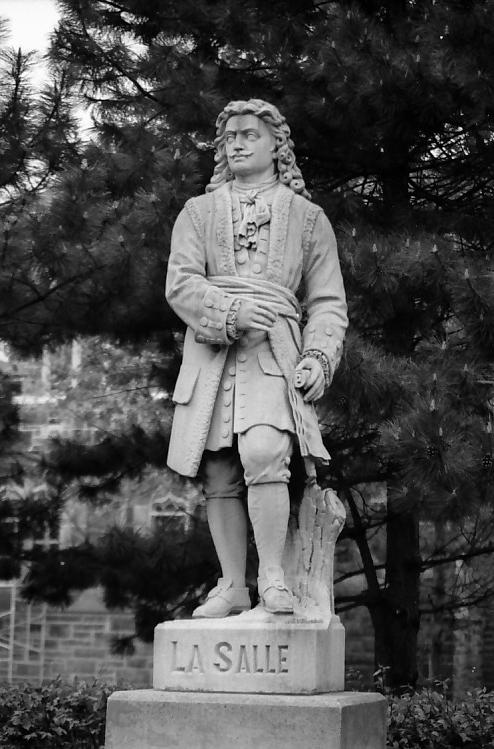
La Salle

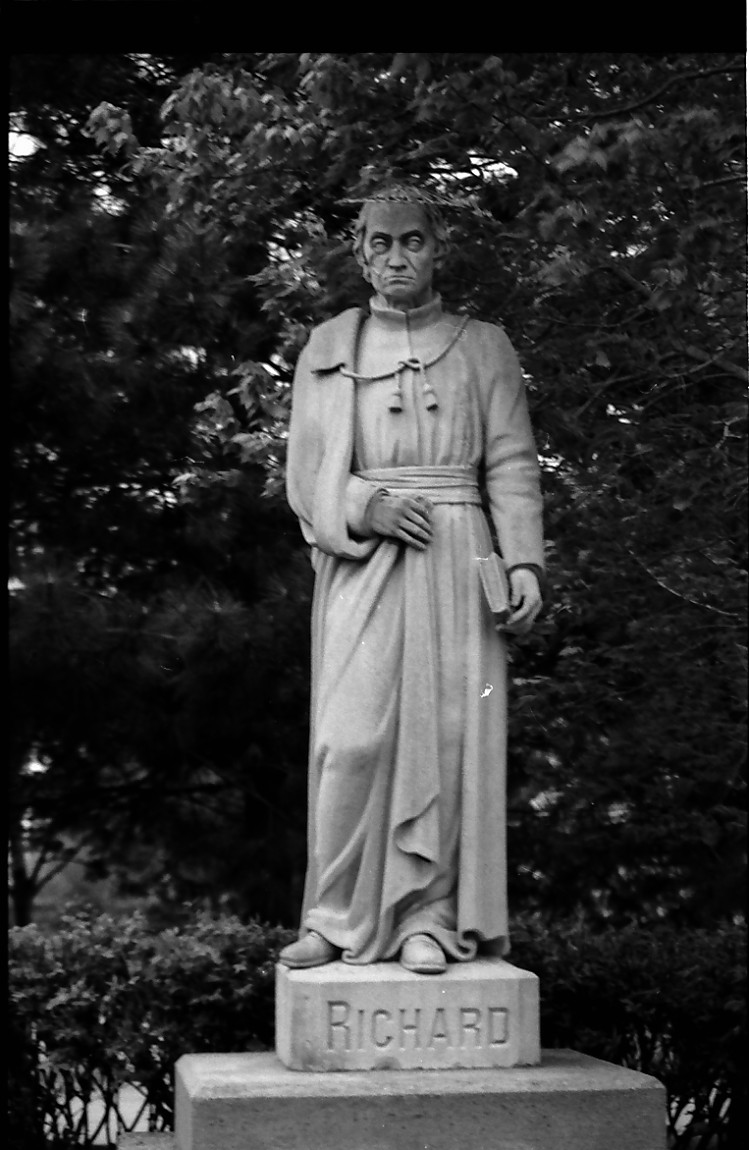
Richard

The clock tower itself featured four, 14-foot stone maidens on its cornice representing justice, industry, art and commerce.
