= George W. Jackson (developer) =

American real estate developer

- Education: Oakland University; Central Michigan University
- Occupation: Real estate developer
- Children: 3

George W. Jackson (born January 1, 1953) is an American real estate developer. From 2002 to 2014, he served as president and CEO of the Detroit Economic Growth Corp (DEGC), a non-profit organization in Michigan.

== Early life and education ==
Jackson is from Detroit, Michigan. He attended Cooley High School, Oakland University and Central Michigan University. He has a bachelor's degree in human resource development from Oakland University and a master's degree in business management from Central Michigan University.

== Career ==
=== Detroit Economic Growth Corporation (DEGC) ===
In February 2002, Jackson began his career at the DEGC as the Interim President and was elected president and CEO in April, 2002. He left the job in 2014.

As of 2014, Jackson was chairman of the board of the Eastern Market Corporation; chairman for the Greater Detroit Foreign Trade Zone; on the executive committee of the Downtown Partnership; and is the steering committee chair of Detroit Future City. He and his company were part of a city project to prepare for the Super Bowl XL in 2006.

=== Post-DEGC work ===
After his retirement, Jackson began his own real estate consulting firm, Ventra Group, where he was president and CEO as of 2015.

== Personal life ==
Jackson is the single father of three sons.

== Awards ==
In 2006, the city magazine Hour Detroit named Jackson "Detroiter of the Year". In 2007, Oakland County's economic initiative Automation Alley awarded him the "CEO of the Year". In 2009, the Friends School in Detroit gave him a "Revitalization of the City Award". In 2016, the publishing company Crain's Detroit Business listed him in its "50 Names to Know: Real Estate" article.
