= Campus Martius Park =

Park in Detroit, Michigan, United States

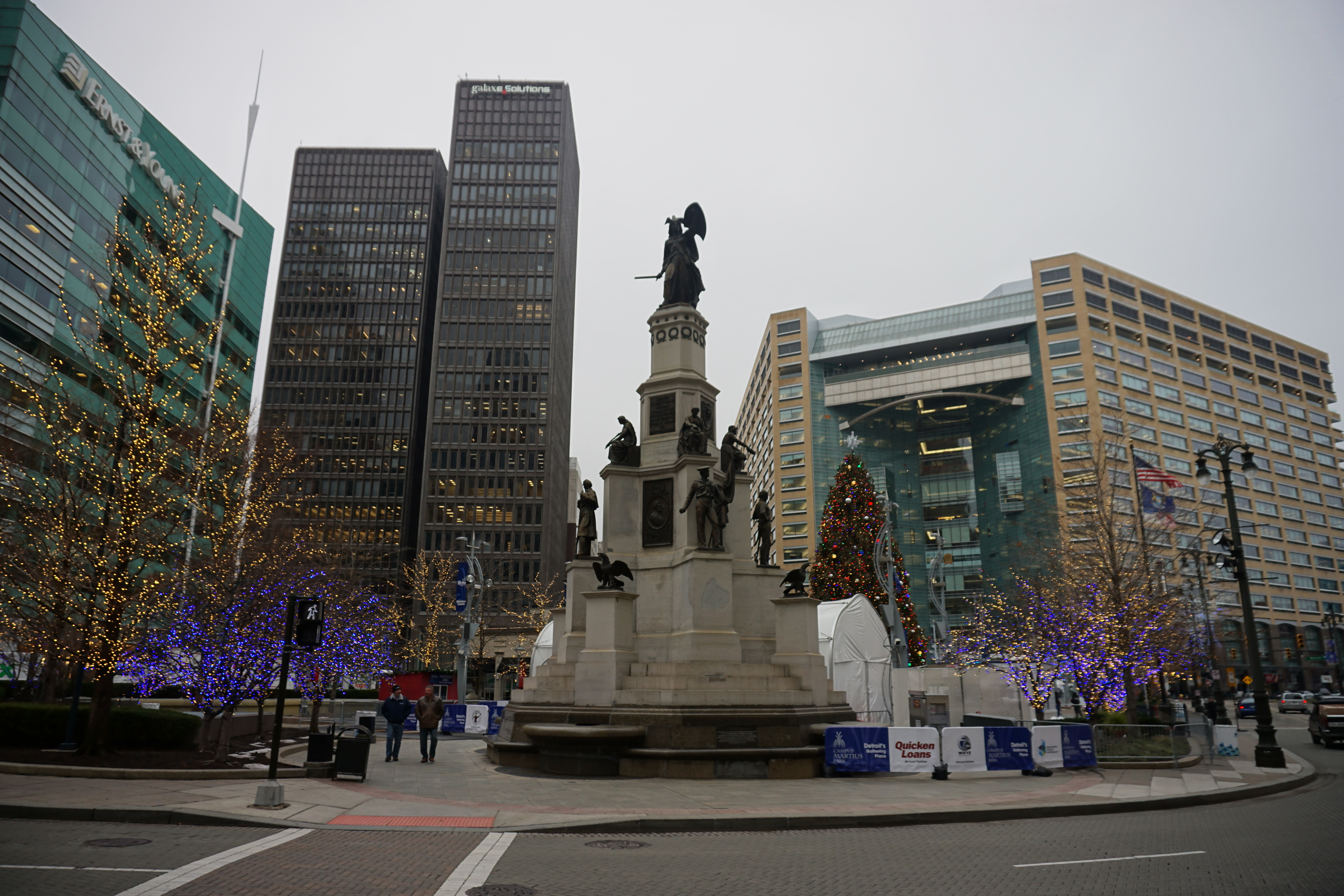
- Soldiers' and Sailors' Monument in Campus Martius
- Interactive map of Campus Martius Park
- Type: Municipal (City of Detroit)
- Location: Detroit, Michigan, U.S.
- Coordinates: 42°19′52″N 83°2′47″W
- Area: 1.2 acres (4,900 m^{2})
- Created: 1850; 2004
- Operator: Detroit 300 Conservancy
- Open: All year
- Public transit: Cadillac Center; QLine Campus Martius

Cadillac Square Park
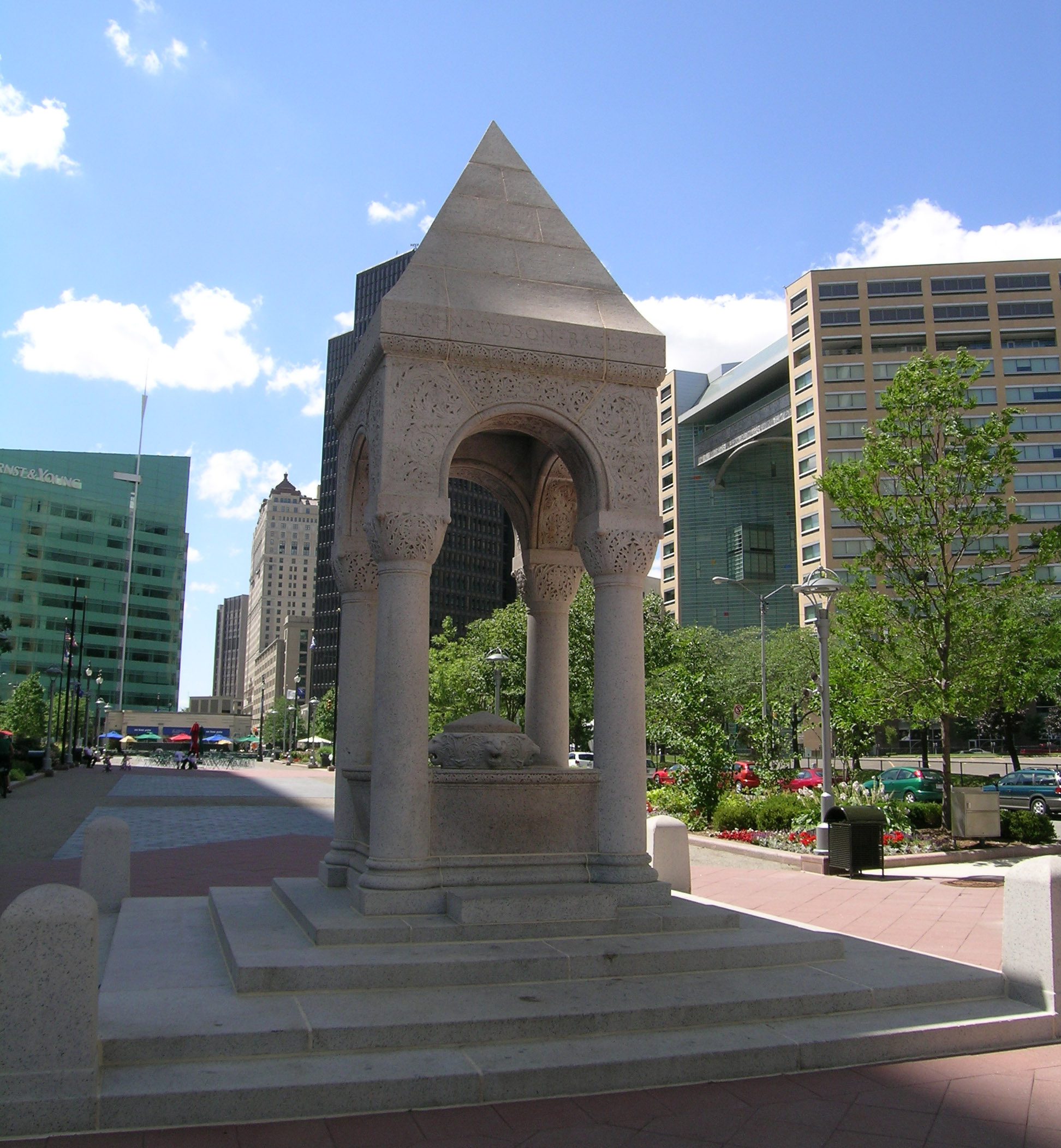
- Bagley Memorial Fountain on Cadillac Square facing Campus Martius
- Interactive map of Cadillac Square Park
- Type: Municipal (City of Detroit)
- Location: Detroit
- Coordinates: 42°19′53″N 83°2′41″W
- Created: 2007
- Open: All year

Campus Martius Park (/ˈmɑːrʃʌs/ MAR-shuss) is a re-established park in Downtown Detroit, Michigan. After the Great Fire of 1805, Campus Martius (from the Latin for Field of Mars, where Roman heroes walked) was the focal point of Judge Augustus Woodward's plans to rebuild the city. It was named for the principal square in Marietta, Ohio, the first capital of the Northwest Territory.

== Description ==
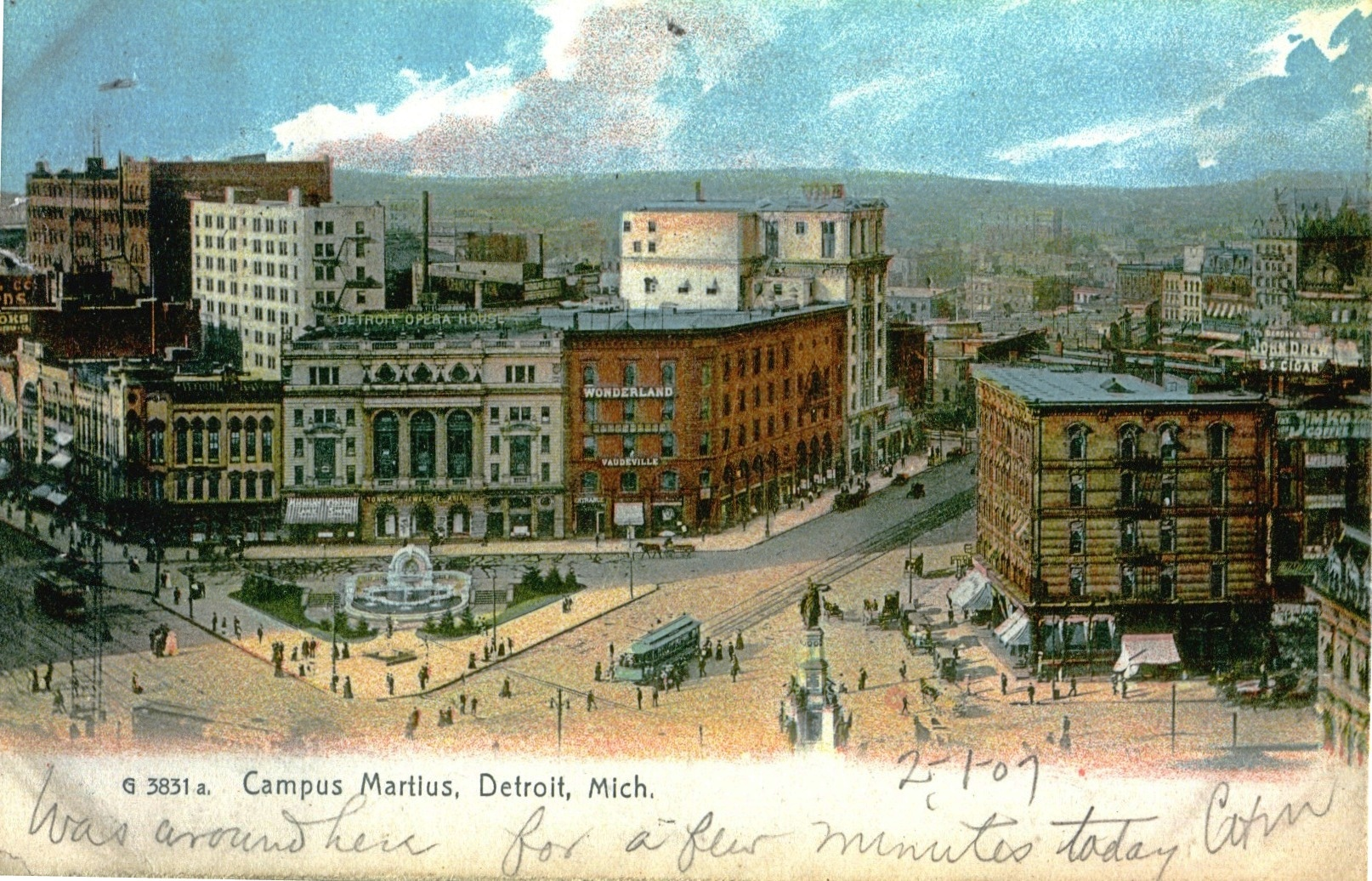
Campus Martius in 1907

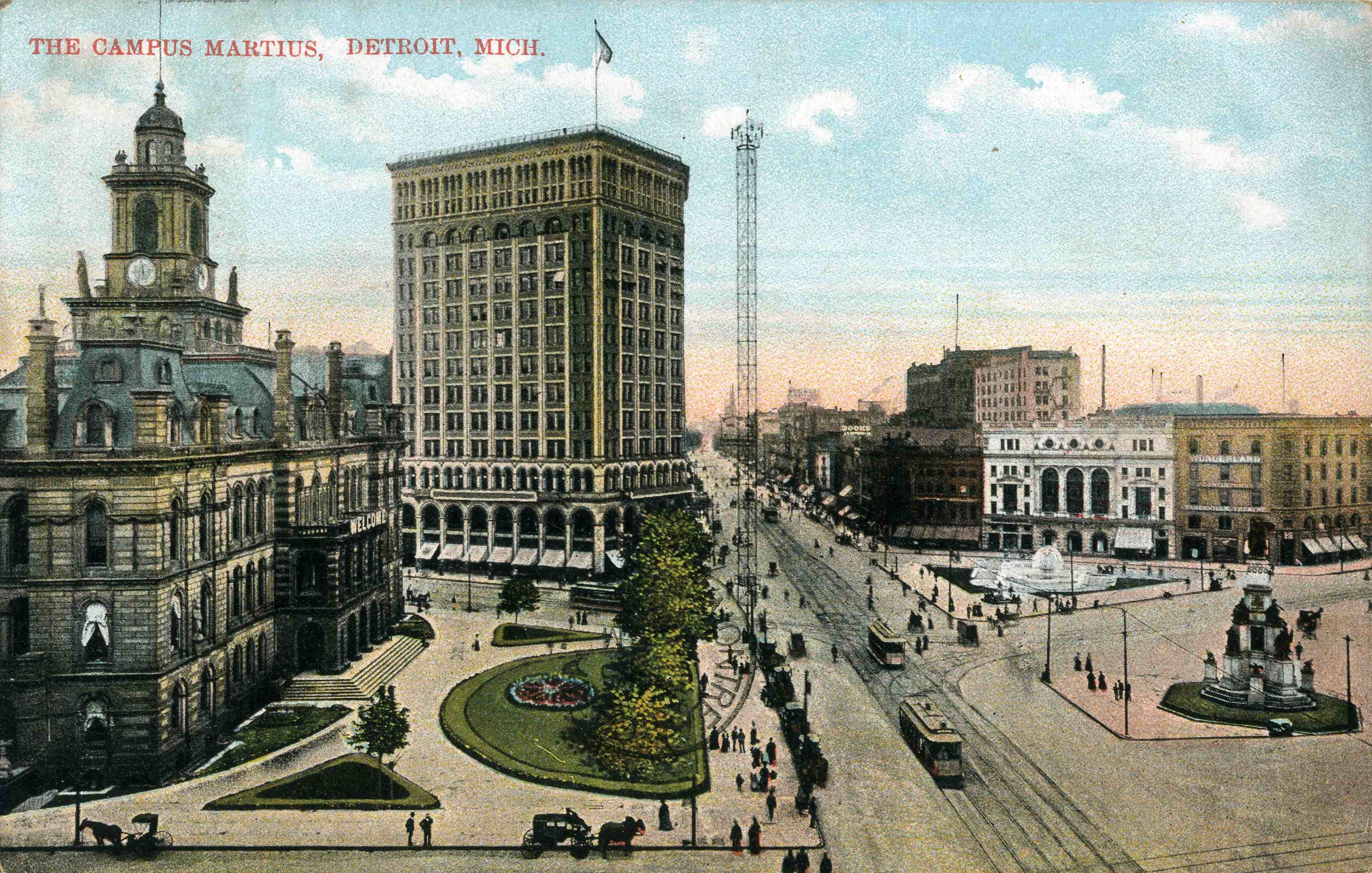
Campus Martius in 1914

The park is located at the intersection of Woodward Avenue and Michigan Avenue, four blocks south of Grand Circus Park. The original park covered several acres and was a major gathering area for citizens. The park was lost in the 1900s as the city's downtown was reconfigured to accommodate increased vehicular traffic.

Hart Plaza, along the riverfront, was designed to replace Campus Martius as a point of importance. But as Hart Plaza is a primarily hard-surfaced area, many residents came to lament the lack of true park space in the city's downtown area. This led to calls to rebuild Campus Martius, the site of the Civil War-era Michigan Soldiers' and Sailors' Monument, located across from the new Compuware Headquarters.

The park is also where the point of origin of Detroit's coordinate system is located. Seven miles (11 km) north of this point is Seven Mile Road; eight miles (13 km) north is Eight Mile Road, and so on. The point of origin is marked by a medallion embedded in the stone walkway. It is situated in the western point of the diamond surrounding the Woodward Fountain, just in front of the park's concession building.

The new Campus Martius Park was dedicated November 19, 2004, and includes two performance stages, sculptures, public spaces and a seasonal ice skating rink. At 1.2 acres (4,900 m^{2}), the park is smaller than its predecessor, as a full restoration of the original would have required the demolition of several buildings. However, the city increased the amount of park space in the area by constructing the new Cadillac Square Park, which opened in summer 2007, immediately to the east of Campus Martius.

The park's skating rink is designed to resemble the Rockefeller Center rink in New York City but is larger in size. Since its opening the rink has been operated by Magic Ice USA, Inc. Campus Martius Park is the home of the annual Motown Winter Blast, an event that has drawn more than 450,000 people to the downtown area every year and it has become the site of the city's annual Christmas-tree-lighting celebration, held the Monday before Thanksgiving. Thousands come to hear Christmas music and countdown to the lighting of the city's official Christmas tree and other decorations to mark the start of the holiday season.

== Cadillac Square Park ==
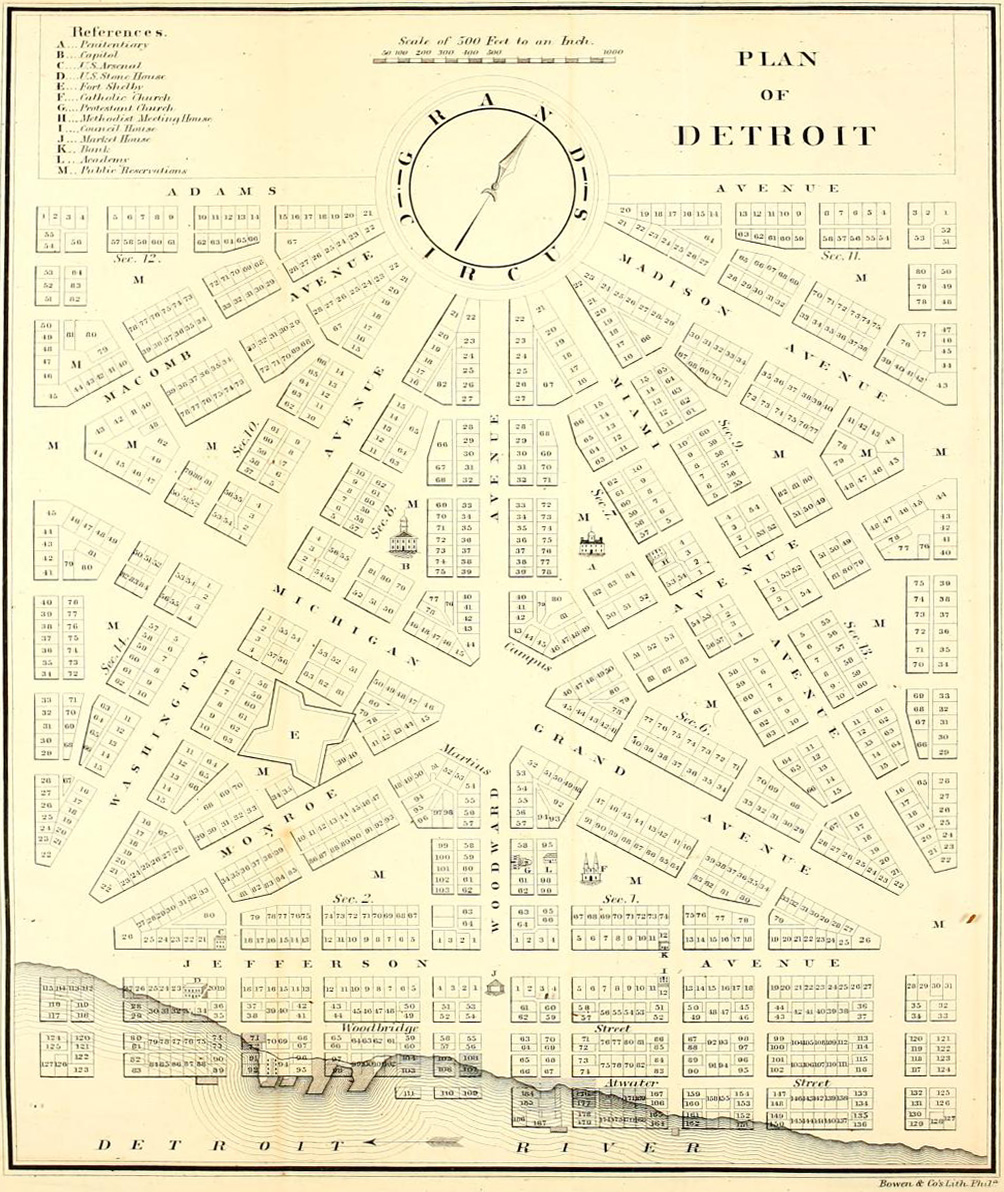
Augustus Woodward's plan following the 1805 fire for Detroit's Baroque-styled radial avenues and Grand Circus

Cadillac Square Park is another re-established park in the area. It lies immediately to the east of Campus Martius Park. Until 2001, the area where the park is located was occupied by a bus-transfer station constructed in the 1960s. From 1841 until 1891, Cadillac Square was the site of the Detroit Farmer's Market. The new park is the site of the relocated Bagley Memorial Fountain which previously occupied a spot on Campus Martius.

In January 2008, the city of Detroit announced plans for a new Cadillac Centre, a $150-million mixed-use residential entertainment-retail complex attached to the Cadillac Tower. Designed by architect Anthony Caradonna and patterned after the Guggenheim Museum Bilbao, the contemporary steel-and-glass twenty-four-story skyscraper complex to be located on Campus Martius Park, was planned to begin construction in the fall of 2009, but was indefinitely postponed by the city in October of that year when the developers failed to meet key agreements with the city.

The French sport of pétanque is played at Cadillac Square each workday from noon to 1 p.m. The similar Italian sport of bocce is also played there.

== Gallery ==
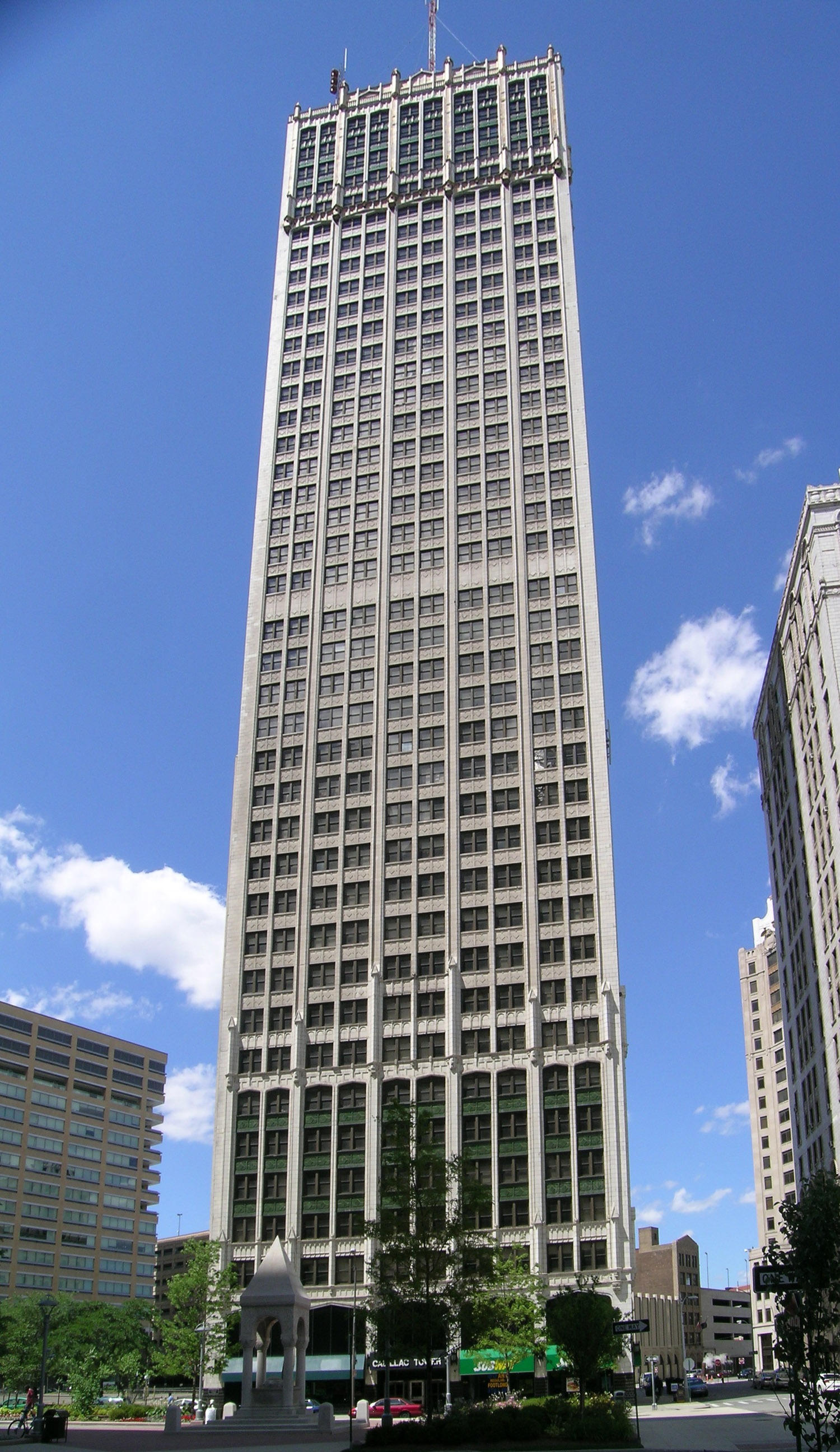
Cadillac Tower, looking up from Cadillac Square

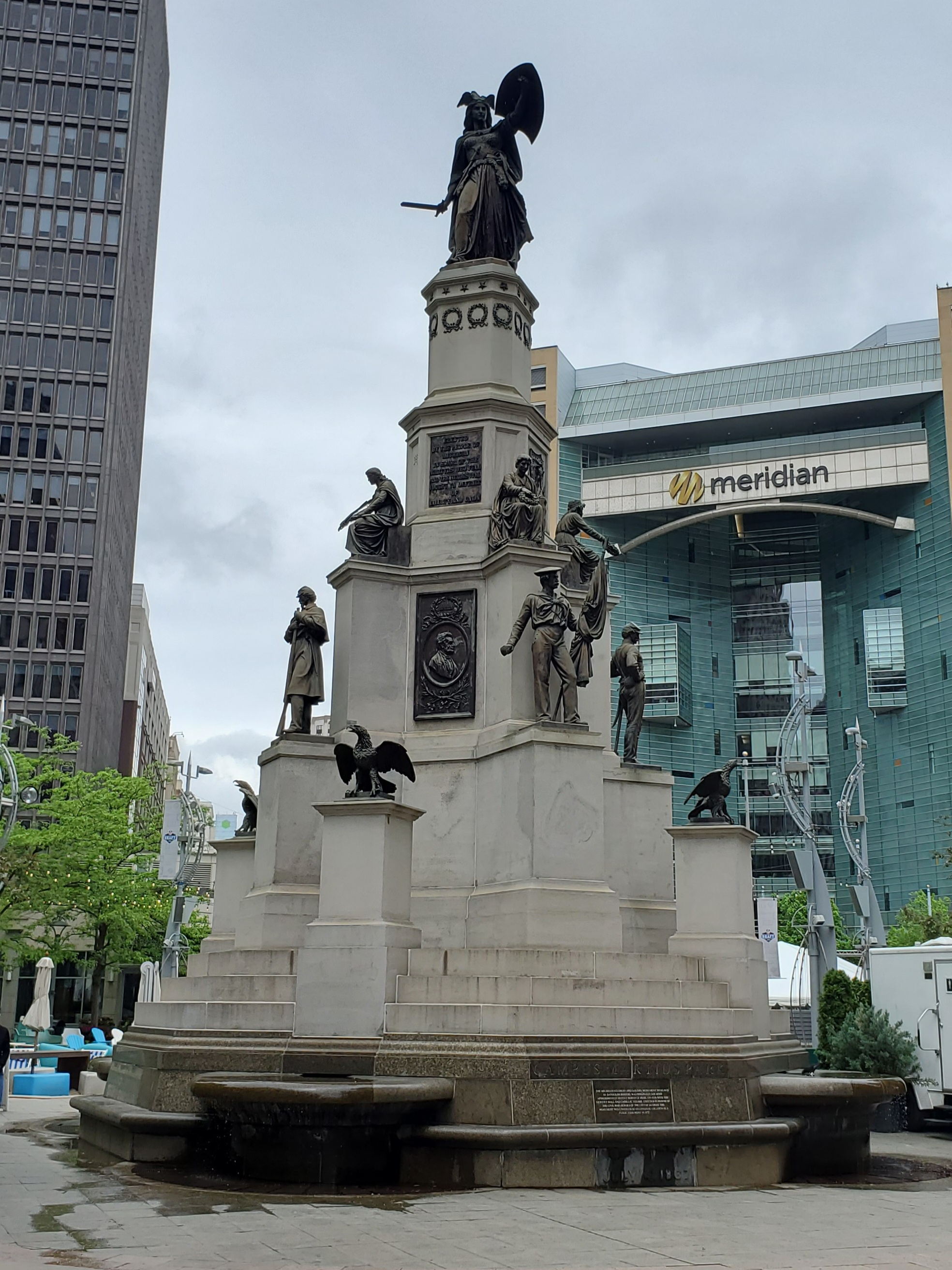
Michigan Soldiers' and Sailors' Monument

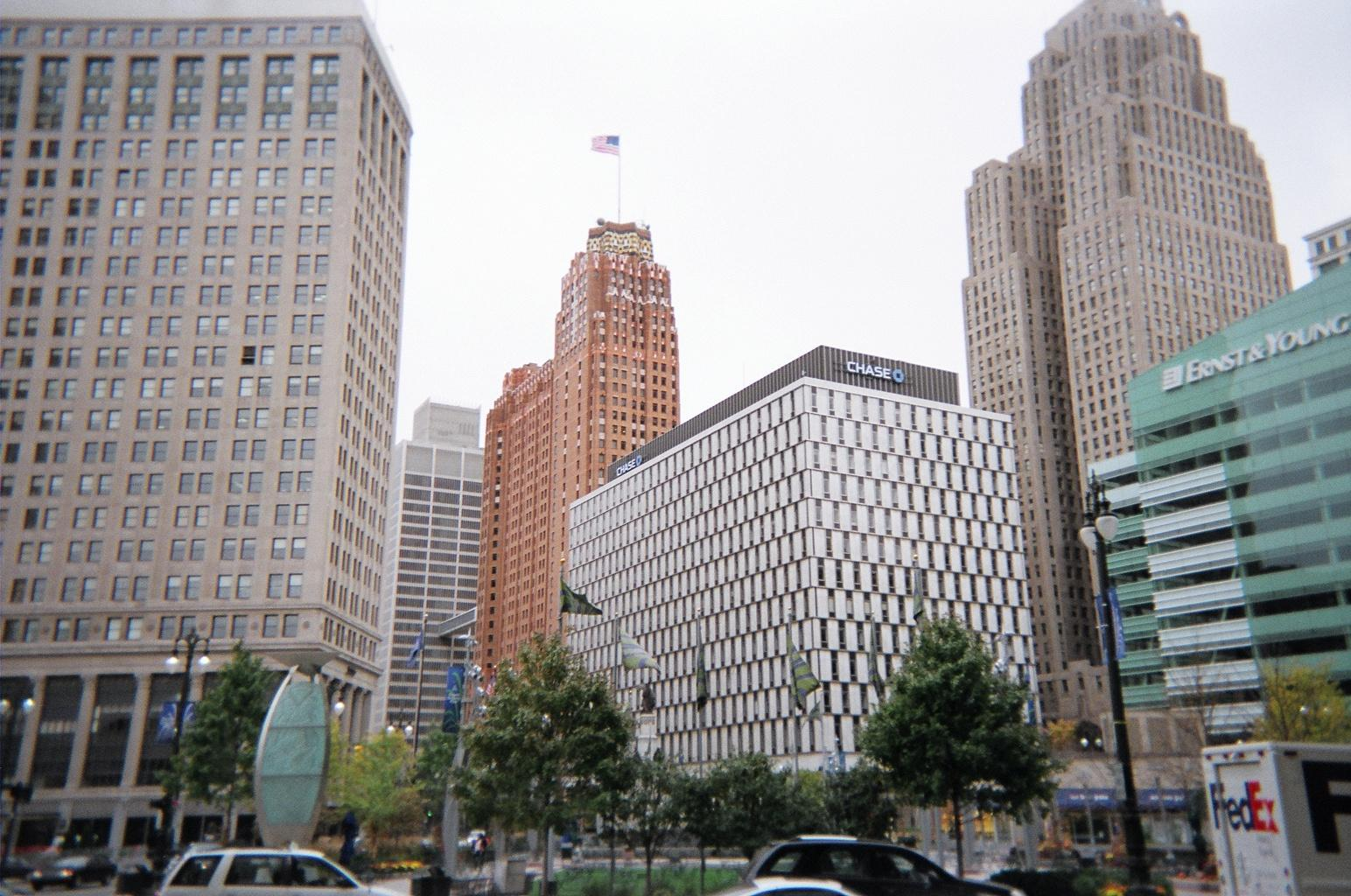
Detroit Financial District from Campus Martius

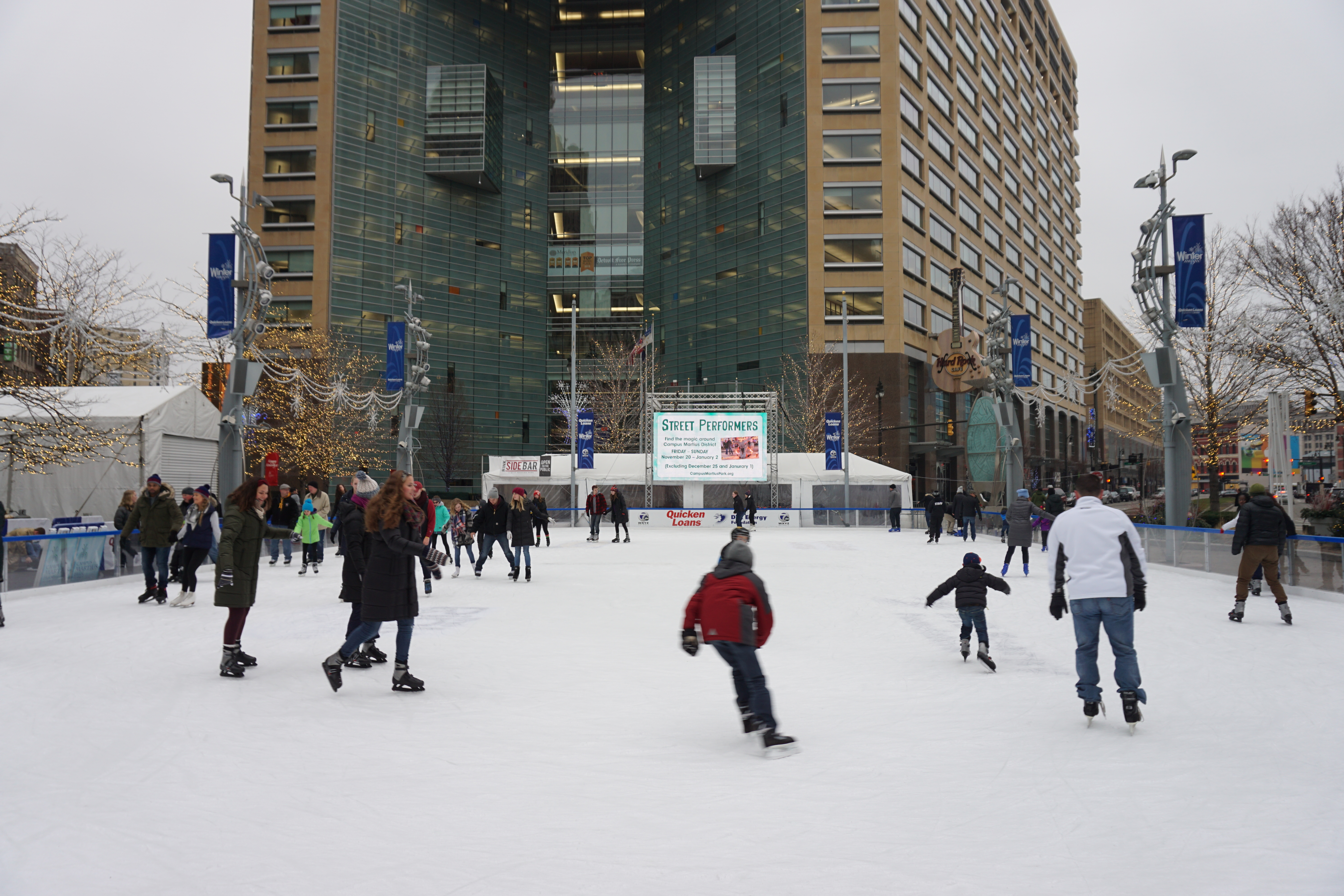
Campus Martius Park skating rink

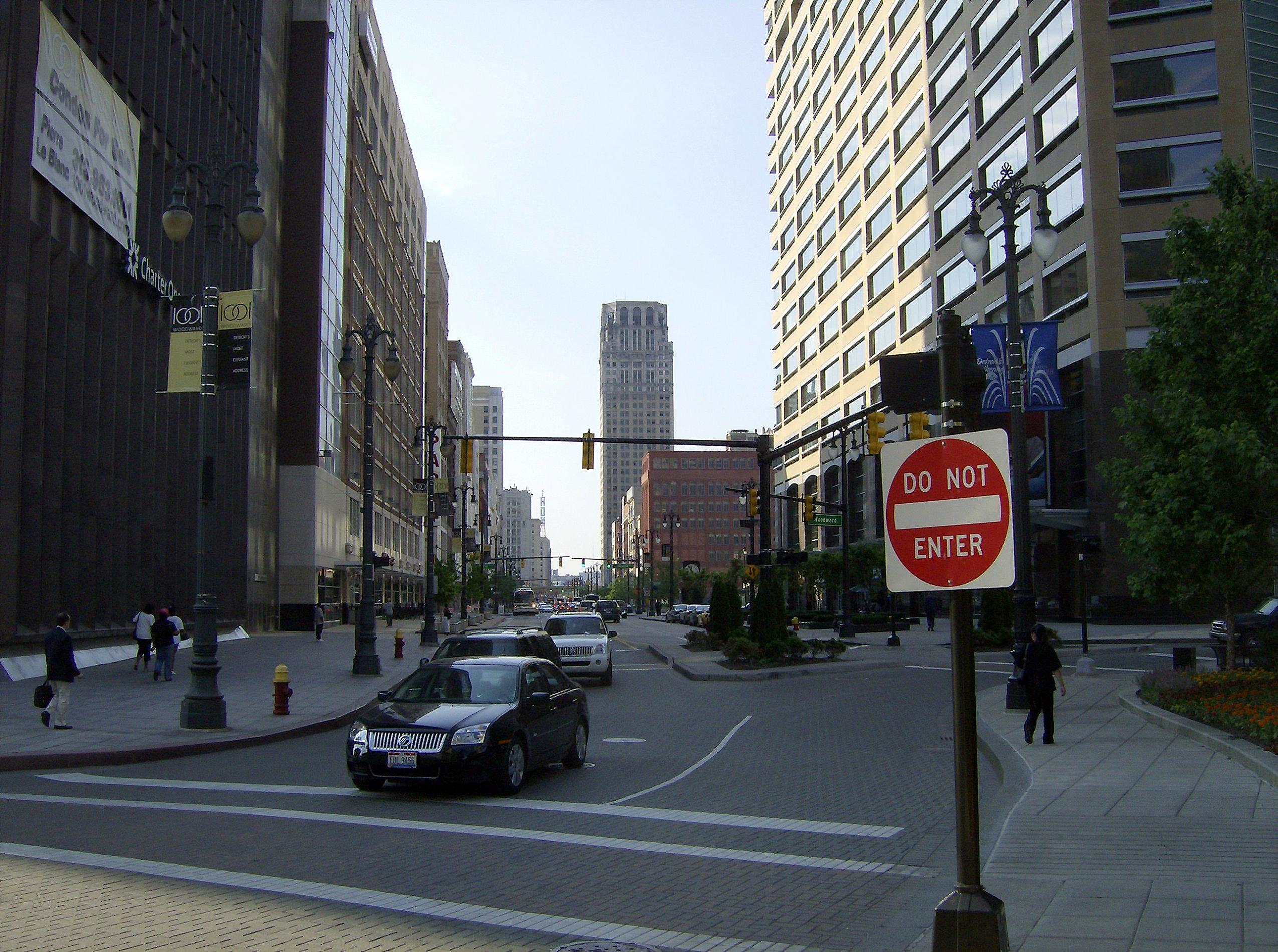
Looking north up Woodward Avenue

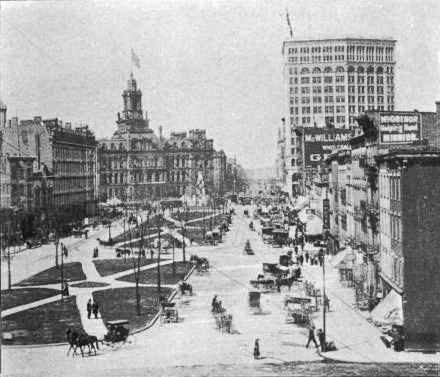
Cadillac Square in 1899, City Hall is on the left and the Majestic Building is to the right

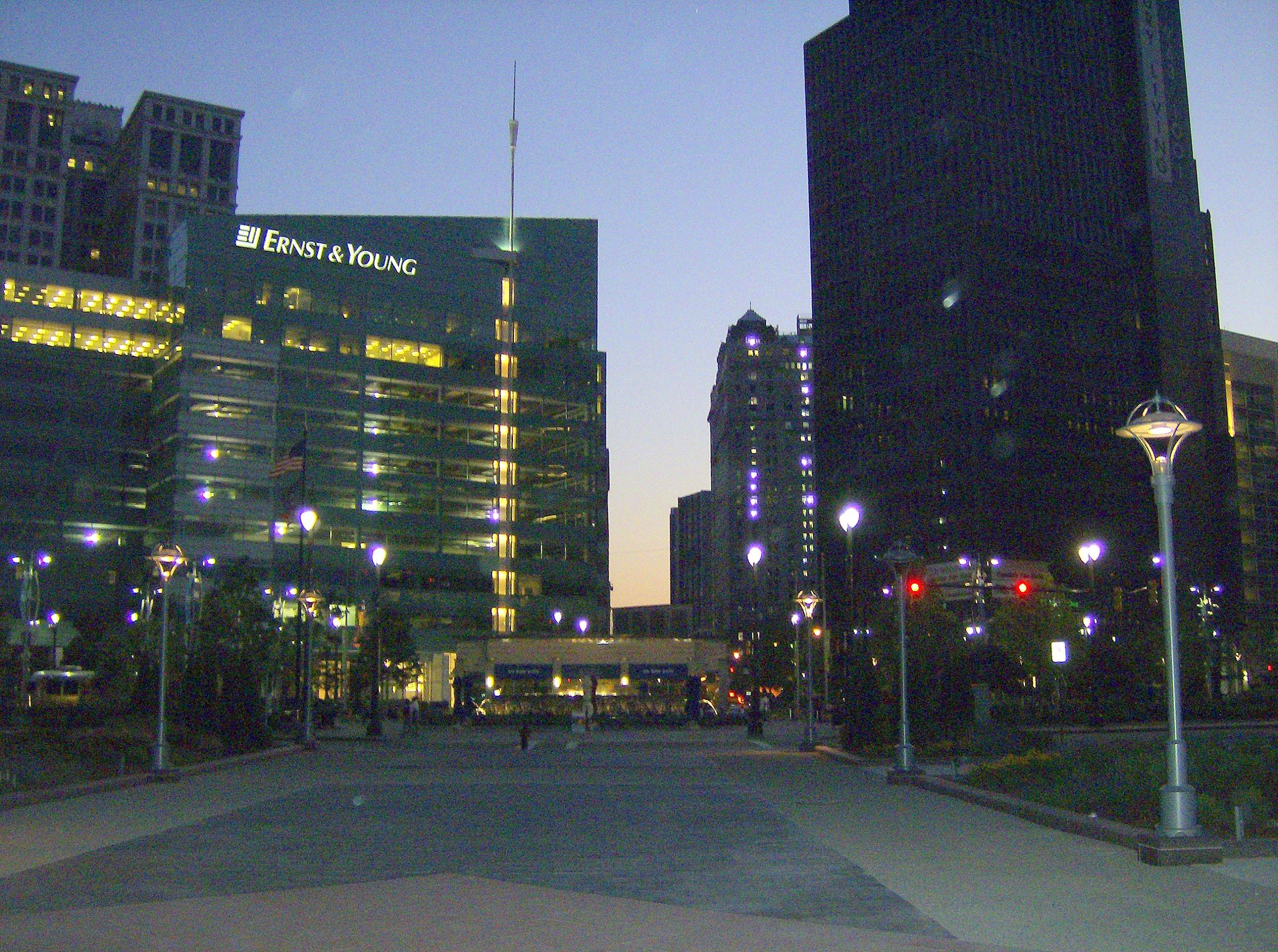
Same view of Cadillac Square in 2007; One Kennedy Square stands on the site of the old City Hall and 1001 Woodward has replaced the Majestic Building

== See also ==
- Cadillac Center Detroit People Mover station
- Detroit International Riverfront
- Grand Circus Park Historic District
