= Downtown Detroit =

Area of Detroit, Michigan, United States

- Central business district and residential area
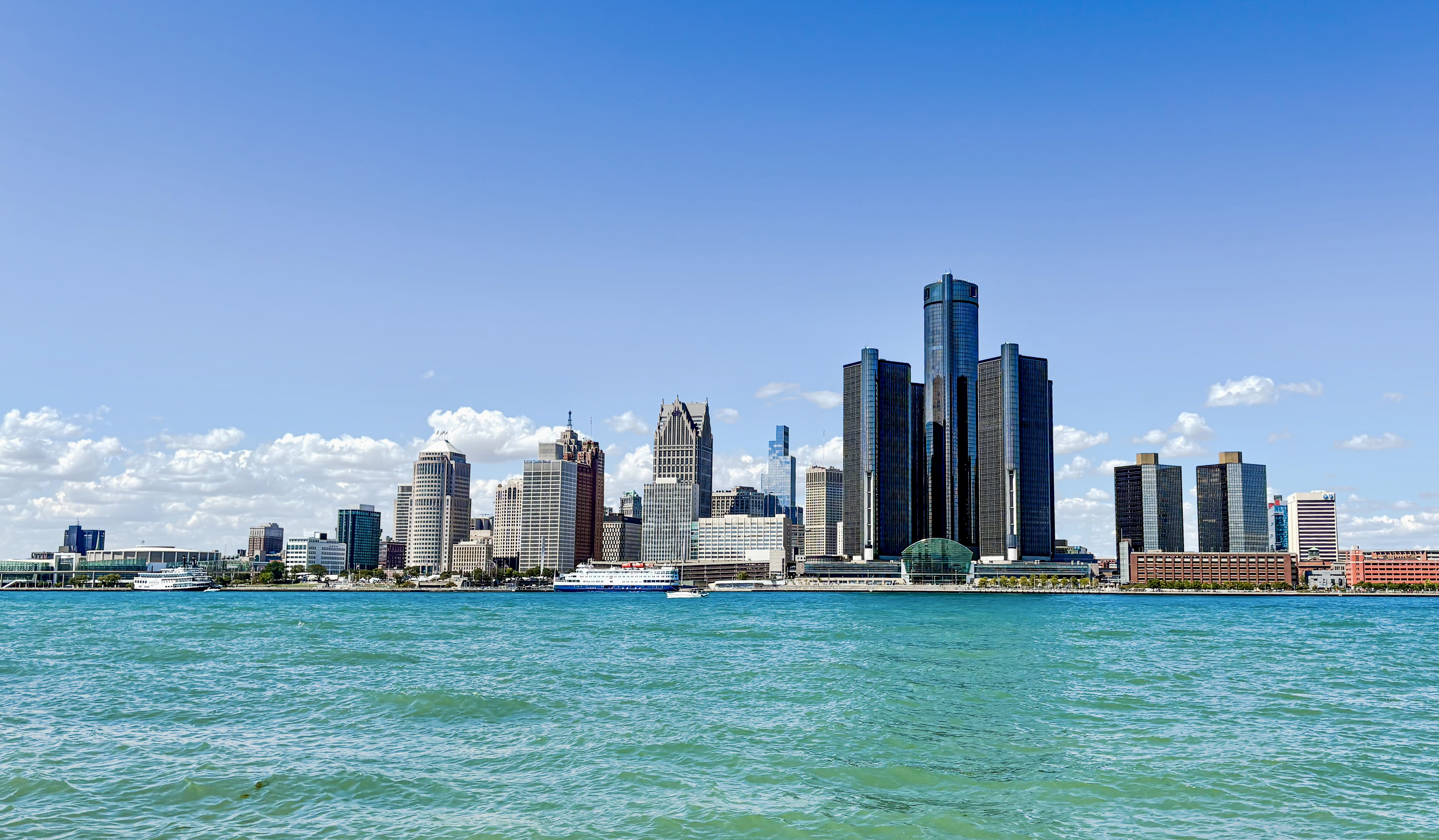
- Downtown Detroit's skyline, as seen from Windsor, Ontario, Canada, in September 2025

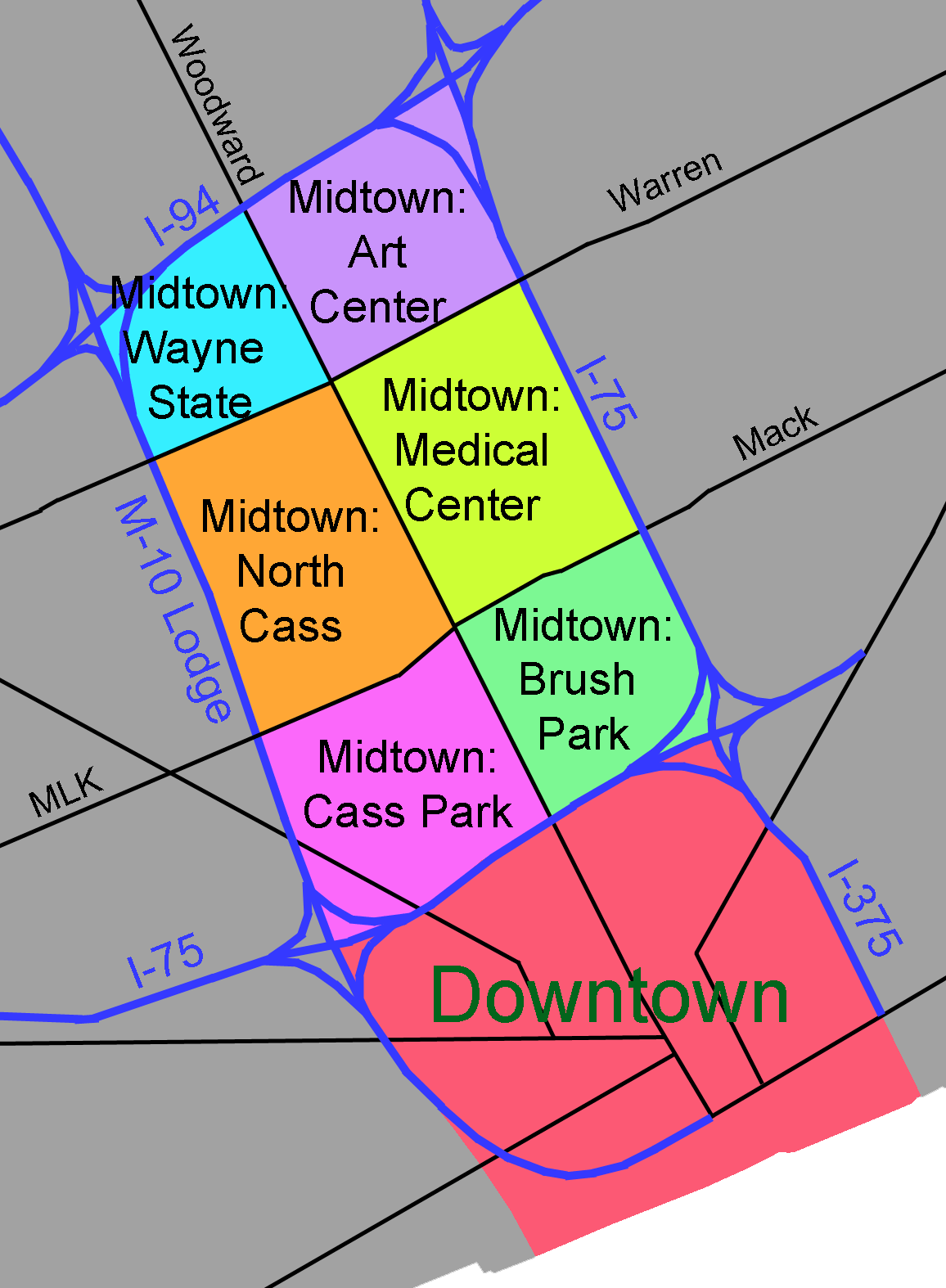
- Location of Downtown in relation to Midtown
- Coordinates: 42°20′02″N 83°02′52″W
- Country: United States
- State: Michigan
- County: Wayne
- City: Detroit

Area
  - Total: 1.4 sq mi (3.6 km^{2})

Population (2020)
  - Total: 6,151
  - Density: 4,271.5/sq mi (1,649.2/km^{2})
- Time zone: UTC-5 (EST)
  - Summer (DST): UTC-4 (EDT)
- ZIP code(s): 48201, 48207, 48226, 48243
- Area code: 313

Downtown Detroit is the central business district and a residential area in the city of Detroit, Michigan, United States. Locally, "downtown" tends to refer to the 1.4 square mile region bordered by M-10 (Lodge Freeway) to the west, Interstate 75 (I-75, Fisher Freeway) to the north, I-375 (Chrysler Freeway) to the east, and the Detroit River to the south. It may also be used to refer to the Greater Downtown area, a 7.2 square mile region that includes surrounding neighborhoods such as Midtown, Corktown, Rivertown, and Woodbridge.

The city's main thoroughfare M-1 (Woodward Avenue) links Downtown to Midtown, New Center, and the North End.

Downtown contains much historic architecture, including prominent skyscrapers, ranging from the Renaissance Center, the Penobscot Building, One Detroit Center, and the Guardian Building. Historic churches, theatres, and commercial buildings anchor the various downtown districts. Downtown has a number of parks including those linked by a promenade along the International Riverfront. Its central square is Campus Martius Park.

== History ==
Following the Great Fire of 1805, the design for the downtown area was left open to a new vision. Augustus B. Woodward proposed a radial design for the post-fire city, where major streets such as Woodward, Washington, and Madison Avenue would spiral off Grand Circus Park. The downtown streets still loosely follow Woodward's original design. Business in Detroit boomed along with its growing automobile industry, leading to an increase in downtown's population and wealth. Much of the downtown area's architecture was built during this boom, in the late 19th century and early 20th century, and still attracts the attention of architects. Several buildings were built by the famous Minoru Yamasaki (most well known for designing the twin towers in New York City), including the McGregor Memorial Conference Center and Federal Reserve Bank of Chicago Detroit Branch Building.

The area where I-375 is lies on the historic site of Black Bottom and Paradise Valley. Black Bottom was one of the city's major African American communities, historically named by French colonial settlers for its rich soil. Paradise Valley was the business and entertainment district of Black Bottom, best known for its Paradise Theatre and Hotel Gotham, where prominent jazz figures such as Duke Ellington, Billie Holiday, and Louis Armstrong performed and stayed. Both neighborhoods were demolished to build I-375, and have since been replaced with Lafayette Park.

== Revitalization ==
Downtown was once notorious for its abandonment, vacant buildings, and disinvestment. However, in recent years, the downtown area has seen tremendous growth and redevelopment.

Since 2000 a number of major construction projects have been completed including the new Compuware Headquarters at Campus Martius Park and two new stadiums: Comerica Park and Ford Field. General Motors moved their headquarters into the Renaissance Center, and the Detroit Lions have relocated from Pontiac to Downtown Detroit. High-profile events like the 2005 MLB All-Star Game, Super Bowl XL, and the 2006 and 2012 World Series have taken place in downtown, generating income for local businesses and spurring more growth. As a result, new residents are moving into Detroit in the assortment of new lofts that are opening. An example of these trends is the Westin Book-Cadillac Hotel. In 2006, the Cleveland-based Ferchill Group began the $180 million redevelopment of the historic Book Cadlliac Hotel at the corner of Washington Boulevard and Michigan Avenue. The project, which has been hailed by preservationists, houses a 455-room Westin Hotel, 67 high-end condominiums, and two to three restaurants, and some miscellaneous retail serving hotel and conference center guests. DTE Energy Headquarters features an urban oasis of parks, walkways, and a reflecting pool.

In 2007, Downtown Detroit was named among the best big-city neighborhoods in which to retire by CNN Money Magazine editors. Downtown contains popular destinations, including the International Riverfront, the MGM Grand Detroit, Greektown Casino Hotel, and many sites listed on the National Register of Historic Places.

Downtown Detroit hosts over 92,000 workers which make up about one-fifth of the city's total employment base; in addition, it is home to about 6,200 residents. Downtown offers a number of residential high rises, including Riverfront Towers, The Albert, and Town Residences.

The Renaissance Center contains the Detroit Marriott hotel, General Motors headquarters, as well as many shops and restaurants. Compuware has its headquarters in the Compuware World Headquarters building by Campus Martius Park in Downtown Detroit. Compuware moved its headquarters and 4,000 employees to Downtown Detroit in 2003. Little Caesars and Olympia Entertainment have their headquarters in the Fox Theatre. Ernst & Young has offices in One Kennedy Square on Campus Martius Park. Pricewaterhouse Coopers has offices in a building across from Ford Field. Chrysler maintains executive offices at Chrysler House in the city's Financial District. In 2011, Quicken Loans moved its headquarters and 4,000 employees to downtown. Comerica Bank and Blue Cross Blue Shield of Michigan are also major employers downtown.

Throughout the late 2010s a large amount of business and investment continued to enter the city and transform it. As of 2019, businesses such as Shinola, Google, Moosejaw, and Nike occupy the once-vacant street fronts. Investments such as new bike lanes, the Little Caesars Arena and QLine have been successful in attracting newcomers to the city. Downtown's transformation in recent years has also perpetuated the discussion of gentrification within the city. The downtown area is notably wealthier than other parts of the city, and has attracted a new demographic of white, middle-class tourists and residents, physically and culturally displacing the black residents of the inner city. The ever-increasing lack of affordable housing and venues for locals have further contributed to this displacement. It is an ongoing debate whether or not this redevelopment is good for the downtown area and Detroit as a whole.

In 2021, the 2-acre Hudson's site 680-foot tower, and the 232-foot tall, block-long building called "the block", with the two sections being separated by an activated alley, were under construction by Dan Gilbert's real estate firm, Bedrock Detroit, that will include 150 apartments, a 200-plus-room hotel, office, retail and event space. Further ongoing new construction underway were The Exchange, a 16-story residential tower, and the 20-story Huntington Bank headquarters tower. In late 2021, Stephen Ross and Christopher Ilitch announced plans for the new home of the University of Michigan's Detroit Center for Innovation (DCI), a $250 million, 4-acre, three building graduate school campus in the downtown District Detroit area.

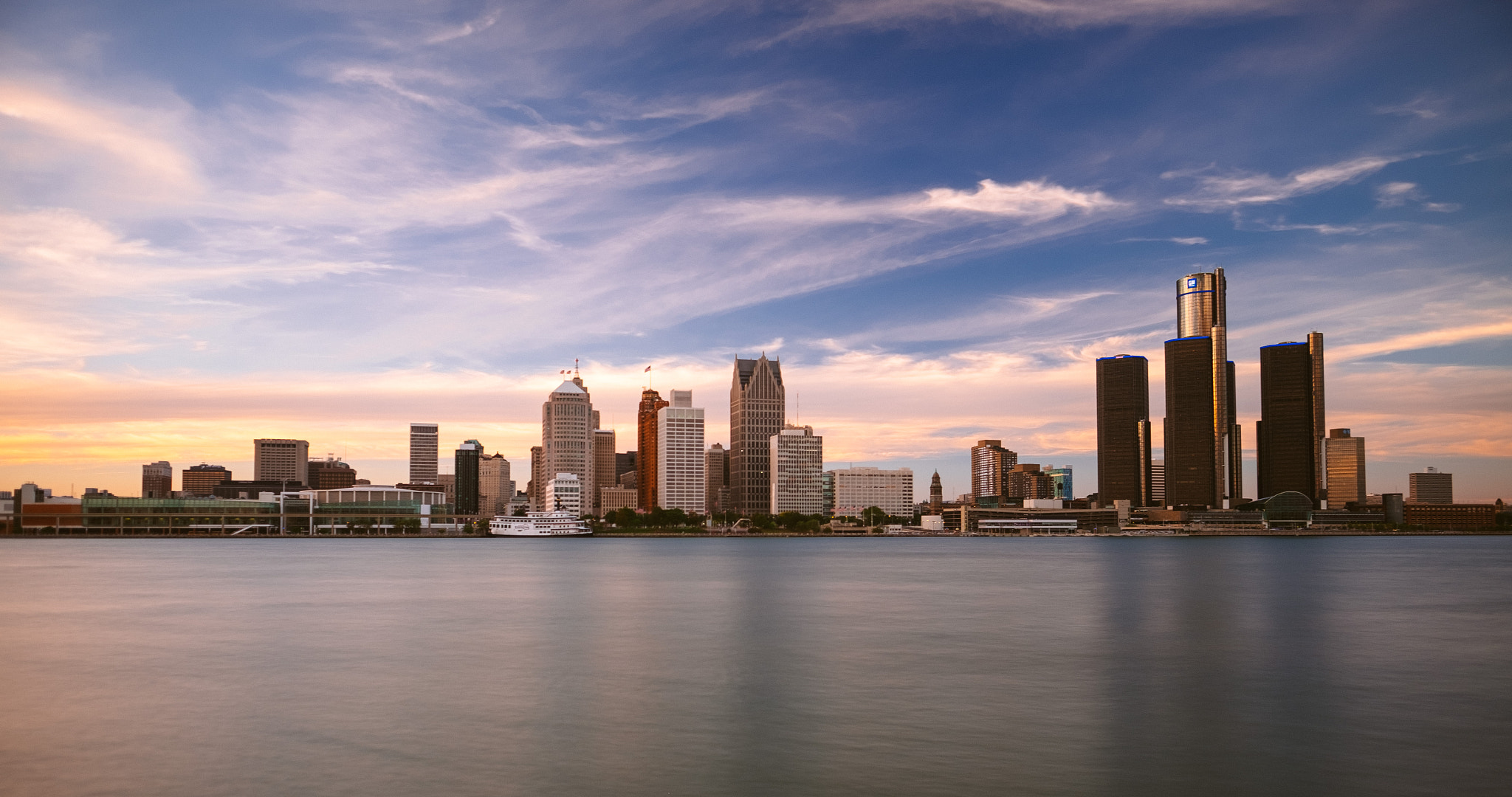
Downtown Detroit seen from Windsor, Ontario in September 2015

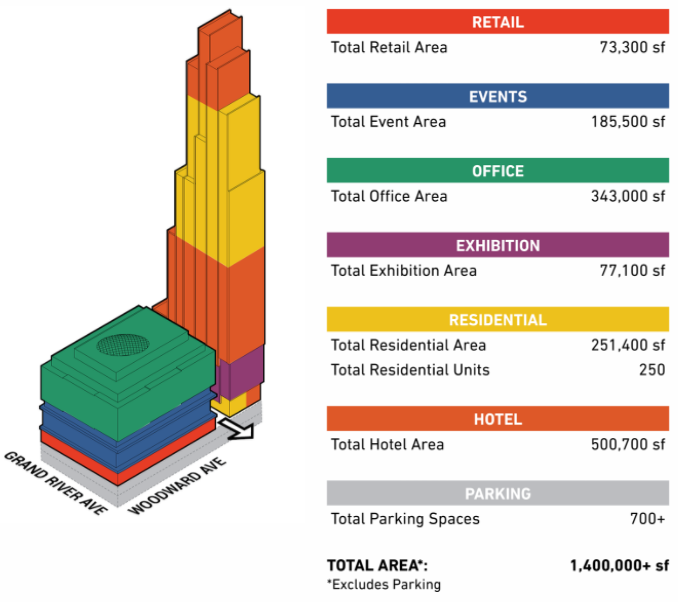
The Hudson's site plan, under construction

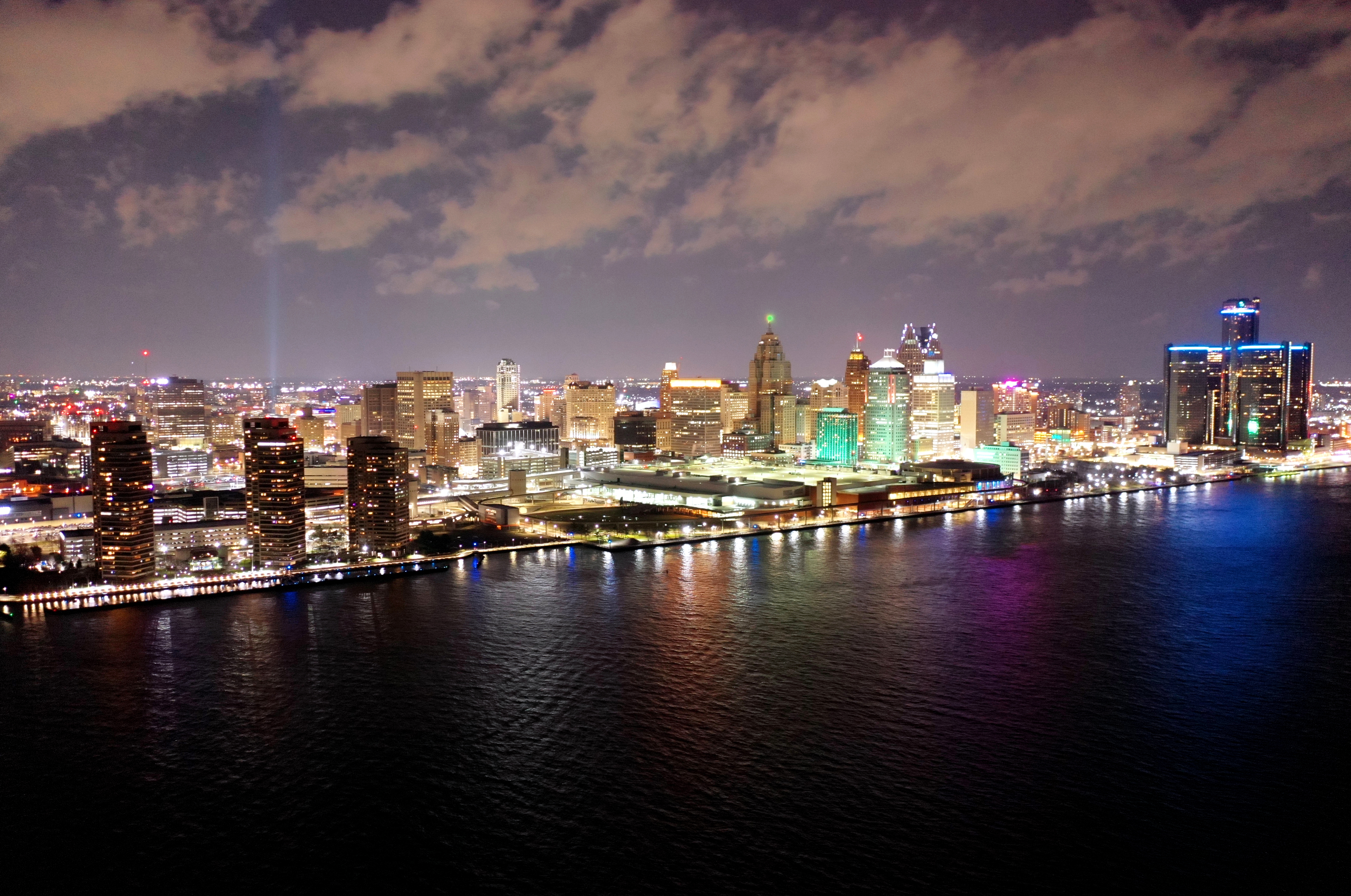
Downtown Detroit seen from Windsor, Ontario in November 2021

== Districts ==
Name	Image	Location	Summary
Bricktown Historic District		Separates the Renaissance Center from Greektown.	Bricktown separates the Renaissance Center from Greektown. Bricktown is home to St. Peter and Paul's Catholic Church, the oldest standing church in Detroit, and the Italian Renaissance style Wayne County Building (which was saved from demolition in the early 1980s). The Wayne County Courthouse, once located in the Wayne County Building, was the place where Mae West was once a defendant on a charge of public indecency. Bricktown is notable for its live music venues. Jacoby's German Biergarten (1904), the city's oldest surviving pub, provides a small performance space for up & coming acts. St. Andrew's Hall is a venue for nationally touring acts, as is the Shelter in the basement of St. Andrew's.
Broadway Avenue Historic District		Broadway between Gratiot and Grand River Boulevard; 42°20′6″N 83°2′46″W	The Broadway Avenue Historic District is located along a single block of Broadway Avenue, and contains eleven commercial buildings built between 1896 and 1926. The area was developed in the late 1800s as a commercial area catering to the women's trade, and included businesses such as hairdressers, florists, corset makers, and fashionable clothiers. Three buildings in the district — the Cary Building, Harmonie Centre, and the Merchants Building — are individually listed on the NRHP.
Campus Martius Park		42°19′53″N 83°2′48″W Woodward Ave.	Campus Martius is a historic district and central gathering place which contains parks, Woodward Fountain, the Michigan Soldiers' and Sailors' Monument, and a large traffic circle surrounded by commercial and residential high-rises including 1001 Woodward Avenue. Since the traffic circle's restoration and expansion, it has emerged as a central gathering spot downtown with a mainstage.
Capitol Park Historic District		Roughly bounded by Grand River Ave., Woodward Ave., Michigan Ave., and Washington Boulevard; 42°19′58″N 83°2′58″W	Capitol Park itself is a triangular plot of land (now a public park) bounded by Shelby Street, Griswold Street, and State Street. A courthouse was built in Capitol Park in 1823–28; when Michigan became a state in 1837, the building served as the state capitol. The Historic District includes the park and seventeen surrounding buildings for a block in each direction, including the Farwell Building, the Griswold Building, the David Stott Building, and the Industrial-Stevens Apartments.
Detroit Financial District		Bounded by Woodward and Jefferson and Lafayette and Washington Boulevard; 42°19′46.36″N 83°2′50.43″W	This is the historic financial district of Detroit which dates to the 1850s and contains prominent skyscrapers. Ornate skyscrapers in Detroit (including the Guardian Building, the Penobscot Building, and One Woodward Avenue), reflecting two waves of large-scale redevelopment: the first in 1900–1930 and the second in the 1950s and early 1960s.
Grand Circus Park Historic District		Roughly bounded by Clifford, John R. and Adams Sts.; also 25 W. Elizabeth; 42°20′10″N 83°3′2″W	Grand Circus Park Historic District contains the 5-acre (2.0 ha) Grand Circus Park, bisected by Woodward Avenue. Notable buildings encircling the park include the David Broderick Tower and David Whitney Building on the south, the Kales Building, Comerica Park, the Fox Theatre, and the Detroit Opera House may be accessed from Grand Circus Park. St. John's Episcopal Church and the Central United Methodist Church are among the many churches and cathedrals on Woodward Ave.
Greektown Historic District		Monroe Ave., between Brush and St. Antoine Sts. 42°20′6″N 83°2′32″W	Greektown is a primarily commercial district that extends two city blocks. It includes St. Mary Roman Catholic Church, Second Baptist Church, separately listed on the Register, Greektown Casino Hotel, and the Athenium Suite Hotel. The district contains numerous restaurants and Greek-themed shops.
East Jefferson Avenue			East Jefferson Avenue runs eastward from Woodward Avenue along the International Riverfront which contains the Renaissance Center, a cruise ship terminal and dock, residential high rises, and a prominade of parks and marinas extending to Belle Isle. The University of Detroit Mercy College of Law is across from the Renaissance Center along Jefferson Avenue. The Detroit People Mover stops at the Renaissance Center along West Jefferson Ave.
West Jefferson Avenue			West Jefferson Avenue runs westward from Woodward Avenue and beneath TCF Center, before passing Joe Louis Arena, the Riverfront Condominiums and other sites along the Detroit International Riverfront extending to the Ambassador Bridge.
Lower Woodward Avenue Historic District		1202–1449 and 1400–1456 Woodward Ave. 42°20′3″N 83°2′56″W	The Lower Woodward Avenue Historic District contains thirty-four commercial buildings built at the end of the nineteenth century and the beginning of the twentieth, many by noted architects. It contains the downtown's historic street-side shopping district.
Monroe Avenue Commercial Buildings		16-118 Monroe Ave. 42°19′58″N 83°2′45″W	The National Theatre (1911) at 118 Monroe Ave., the oldest surviving theatre in Detroit, is a part of the city's original theatre district from the late 1800s. Albert Kahn designed the theatre.
Park Avenue Historic District		Park Ave., between W. Adams Ave. and W. Fisher Freeway; 42°20′12″N 83°3′49″W	In the 1920s, Detroit's prestigious Grand Circus Park was crowded with buildings and development began to spill north from Grand Circus Park up Park Avenue. In 1923, the Park Avenue Association was formed. They planned the street to concentrate high-grade commercial and office space at the south end, and prestigious residential development at the north end, much like New York City's Fifth Avenue. The district includes the Women's City Club, the Park Avenue House, and the Kales Building.
Randolph Street Commercial Buildings Historic District		1208–1244 Randolph St. 42°20′4″N 83°2′42″W	Buildings along this section of Randolph Street have been used for retail since the area was first built up in the 1840s; the building at 1244 Randolph was built during the period of original construction. As the city grew, larger commercial buildings were required and the other structures on Randolph were constructed.
Washington Boulevard Historic District		Washington Boulevard, between State and Clifford Sts. 42°19′59″N 83°3′4″W	This district includes the Book-Cadillac Hotel, the Book Tower, the Industrial-Stevens Apartments, and Washington Square (Trolley Plaza) among other architecturally significant buildings. The Detroit Statler Hotel was located on the boulevard until it was demolished in 2005. The street was broadened and ornamented in the early part of the twentieth century to resemble New York's Fifth Avenue and European boulevards.

== Demographics ==
Historical population
Census	Pop.	Note	%±
1990	5,990		—
2000	6,141		2.5%
2010	5,287		−13.9%
2020	6,151		16.3%

As of the 2020 Census, there were 6,151 people living in the district. The population density was 4,271.5 people per square mile (1,649.2/km^{2}). There were 5,323 housing units. The census reported the district residents as 54.2% White, 30.4% Black, 0.4% Native American, 6.4% Asian, 0.09% Pacific Islander, 2.2% other races, and 6.0% two or more races. Hispanic or Latino of any race were 6.5% of the total population.

As recently as 2011 the population of full-time residents in Downtown Detroit was relatively low. However, its population grew by an estimated 15 percent between 2012 and 2016 as it experienced a construction boom.

Downtown Detroit – Racial and ethnic composition. Downtown Detroit includes census tracts 5172, 5207, and 5208. Note: the US Census treats Hispanic/Latino as an ethnic category. This table excludes Latinos from the racial categories and assigns them to a separate category. Hispanics/Latinos may be of any race.
Race / Ethnicity (NH = Non-Hispanic)	Pop 2000	Pop 2010	Pop 2020	% 2000	% 2010	% 2020
White alone (NH)	1,290	1,399	3,190	21.01%	26.46%	51.86%
Black or African American alone (NH)	4,518	3,337	1,859	73.57%	63.12%	30.22%
Native American or Alaska Native alone (NH)	13	21	18	0.21%	0.40%	0.29%
Asian alone (NH)	84	212	396	1.37%	4.01%	6.44%
Native Hawaiian or Pacific Islander alone (NH)	0	0	5	0.00%	0.00%	0.08%
Other race alone (NH)	11	6	38	0.18%	0.11%	0.62%
Mixed race or Multiracial (NH)	101	145	243	1.64%	2.74%	3.95%
Hispanic or Latino (any race)	124	167	402	2.02%	3.16%	6.54%
Total	6,141	5,287	6,151	100.00%	100.00%	100.00%

== Government ==
The city of Detroit offices are located in the Coleman Young Municipal Building. The Guardian Building serves as headquarters for Wayne County. Detroit Fire Department has its headquarters in Downtown Detroit. The Detroit Police Department has its headquarters in Downtown Detroit. The Central District patrol division of the police department serves Downtown Detroit.

Federal offices are in the Patrick V. McNamara Federal Building. They include an FBI field office.

== Infrastructure ==
The Detroit Greyhound Lines station is directly west of Downtown along the John C. Lodge Freeway. The Detroit Department of Transportation system provides mass-transit by bus. The Rosa Parks Transit Center, completed in 2009, serves as the main hub for the bus systems downtown. It is adjacent to two stops on the Detroit People Mover. The People Mover, a 2.94-mile (4.7 km) automated rail rapid transit system, operates on a single-track, one-way loop through the downtown area. Suburban Mobility Authority for Regional Transportation has its headquarters in the Buhl Building in Downtown Detroit.

In late July 2014, construction began on the QLine, which opened to the public in 2017. It runs 3.3 miles on Woodward Avenue from Congress Street in Downtown Detroit to Grand Boulevard in New Center.

== Economy ==
Companies with headquarters in Downtown Detroit include Compuware, Dickinson Wright, General Motors, Little Caesars, Campbell-Ewald, Miller Canfield, and Quicken Loans.

On October 28, 2014, Fifth Third Bank announced plans to move its Michigan regional headquarters from Southfield to downtown Detroit in what was to be named the Fifth Third Bank Building at One Woodward. The bank was to occupy about 62,000 sq ft (5,800 m^{2}) of the structure and has also pledged to invest $85 million in the city of Detroit. The office had 150 employees.

Previously Comerica Bank had its headquarters in Downtown Detroit. On March 6, 2007, the company announced its decision to relocate its corporate headquarters to Dallas. The company executives began moving to Dallas in November 2007. At one time Real Times Media, the owner of black newspapers in the United States, had its headquarters in the Globe Tobacco Building, and later the Buhl Building.

== Media ==
The Detroit Media Partnership, housing both The Detroit News and the Detroit Free Press, has its headquarters in Downtown Detroit.

The Metro Times was previously headquartered in the Detroit Cornice and Slate Company Building in Downtown.

The studio of WDIV (Detroit's NBC affiliate) is located in Downtown Detroit; it is the only TV station in the Detroit media market with studios located in the city as WXYZ, WJBK, WWJ, WMYD, WPXD, and WKBD (affiliates of ABC, Fox, CBS, MyNetworkTV, Ion Television and The CW respectively) have their studios in the nearby city of Southfield.

== Park and entertainment ==
Downtown Detroit has seen a major growth in entertainment in the past decade. Campus Martius Park is open year-round, with ice skating in the winter with a huge Christmas tree display, to a large fountain and many concerts in the summer. In December 2012, the largest Buffalo Wild Wings in the country opened in the district, and a new mixed-use development by CEO Dan Gilbert, businessman, and developer, The Z, due to its Z-like shape, with 1,300 parking spaces, artwork, LED lighting, and 33,000-square-feet of street level retail space. The Z is full of murals and other artwork from 27 international artists, and the floors are color-coded. The Z opened on January 30, 2014. On December 10, 2014, Punch Bowl Social opened a new 24,000-square-foot bi-level eatery and entertainment complex in The Z structure.

Some places for entertainment and attractions within the downtown region include Campus Martius Park, Philip A. Hart Plaza, Coleman A. Young Community Center, Detroit Riverwalk, Fox Theatre, Ford Field, Little Caesars Arena, and Comerica Park.

== Education ==
=== Colleges and universities ===
The University of Detroit Mercy School of Law is located downtown across from the Renaissance Center. Wayne County Community College District (WCCCD) has its headquarters in Downtown Detroit. The Downtown Campus of the district is located adjacent to Downtown Detroit and adjacent to the WCCCD headquarters. Wayne State University is located in Midtown Detroit. The Corktown Campus, near downtown at 2700 Martin Luther King Jr. Boulevard, houses the University of Detroit Mercy School of Dentistry and Dental Clinic. The main campus of the University of Detroit Mercy is located uptown.

The Detroit College of Law was in Downtown Detroit until 1997. It moved to East Lansing, Michigan in 1997 and is now known as the Michigan State University College of Law.

=== Primary and secondary education ===
As of 2016 there is a concentration of charter schools and senior high schools in the Downtown Detroit area - there were eleven high schools and 1,894 high school-aged students in the area- relative to other parts of Detroit which had more high school students but fewer schools available. This is because Downtown Detroit is relatively wealthy compared to other parts of Detroit and because of gentrification.

The Detroit Public Schools, charter schools, and private schools serve city residents. Downtown residents enrolled in the public school system are zoned for Martin Luther King High School. Some downtown residents are zoned for Burton K-8 for elementary school, while others are zoned to Chrysler Elementary School. Burton K-8 and Bunche K-8 serve portions of Downtown for middle school.

Previously Dewey K-8 served portions of Downtown Detroit for elementary school. Previously Miller Middle School, and Duffield Middle School served portions of Downtown Detroit. Previously Murray-Wright High School served Downtown Detroit for high school.

The Archdiocese of Detroit lists a number of primary and secondary schools in the city, along with those in the metro area. There are 23 Catholic high schools in the Archdiocese of Detroit. Of the three Catholic high schools in the city, two are operated by the Society of Jesus and the third is co-sponsored by the Sisters, Servants of the Immaculate Heart of Mary and the Congregation of St. Basil.

=== Public libraries ===
The Detroit Public Library operates the Rose and Robert Skillman Branch Library downtown at 121 Gratiot with the library headquarters located in Midtown. The downtown branch first opened January 4, 1932. Skillman received its current name after the Skillman Foundation donated to the library system.

== Diplomatic missions ==
Three consulates are located in the Renaissance Center; the Consulate-General of Japan, Detroit is located on the 16th Floor of the 400 Tower, the Consulate-General of Canada in Detroit is located in Suite 1100 of the 600 Tower, and the Consulate of Italy in Detroit is located in Suite 950 of the 400 Tower. The Consulate of Italy in Detroit used to be located in Suite 1840 in the Buhl Building until 2021. The Consulate of Mexico in Detroit is located in Suite 830 in the Penobscot Building.

== See also ==
- Midtown
- New Center
- Corktown
- North Corktown
