= Nathan Johnson (architect) =

American architect (1926–2021)

- Born: April 9, 1926; Herington, Kansas, United States
- Died: November 5, 2021 (aged 95); Detroit, Michigan, United States
- Education: Kansas State University
- Occupation: Architect
- Years active: 1950–2000
- Organization: Kappa Alpha Psi Fraternity
- Notable work: Second Baptist Church (1968), Stanley Mannia Cafe (1969)
- Spouse: Ruth Gardenhire (m. 1952–2015; death)
- Children: 3
- Awards: AIA Detroit Gold Medal (2018)

Nathan Johnson (1926–2021), was an American modernist architect in Detroit, Michigan. He designed some of the most iconic 1960s churches in Detroit, and it is estimated at forty churches. He also designed public housing, campuses and dorms for churches and schools, single-family residential work and apartment towers. Johnson was active when there were few Black architects in the city of Detroit, and was instrumental in supporting his community. His architecture firm was Nathan Johnson & Associates, Inc., active from 1956 until around 2000.

== Early life and education ==
Nathan Johnson was born on April 9, 1926 in Herington, Kansas, as the youngest child of Ida & Brooks Johnson. His father, Brooks, was a railroad worker. He showed artistic tendencies from a young age, and was encouraged by his eighth grade teacher to pursue architecture as a stable career choice.

Johnson attended Kansas State University, where he graduated top ten in his class in 1950 with a degree in architecture. There he joined the Kappa Alpha Psi fraternity. Johnson was in the United States Navy for 3.5 years. In 1952, he married Ruth Gardenhire; together they had three children.

== Career ==
Johnson came to Detroit in 1950 to work as a draftsman for the Black-owned architectural firm, White & Griffin (led by architects Donald Frank White and Francis Eugene Griffin). He left White & Griffin around 1953, during the firm's Liberian design projects. Johnson later worked for Austrian-born architect, Victor Gruen, who specialized in designing shopping malls.

Johnson formed his own architectural firm from the basement of his home in Detroit in 1956. His office was at 2512 W. Grand Boulevard in Detroit. Commissions started out as small scale projects for the African American community, as racial barriers prevented involvement in more lucrative projects. His first solo project was the Pure in Heart Baptist Church at Holcomb and Goethe St in Detroit, MI. He had hired anywhere from two to forty employees at any given time. Debra Davis, Sidney Cobb, Robert Polk, and Spinks were associates that worked at his firm. Johnson mentored many young Black architects in Michigan. One of his most notable designs was Stanley Mannia Café (1969–1971), a Googie style Chinese restaurant in Detroit. Mannia Café became a famous eatery with Motown musicians and politicians.

In 1963, the Detroit Free Press newspaper did a profile of Johnson, in which he declared his commitment to Modernism. He did not like Revival style architecture, and particularly disliked Colonial architecture, which he felt did not deserve a place in modern design.

In the 1980s Johnson was chosen by Mayor Coleman Young to design all of downtown’s People Mover stations, an automated public transport system in the city of Detroit. Johnson took this as an opportunity that he shared by subcontracting several of the people mover stations to African American peers including Aubrey Agee, Roger Margerum, Howard Francis Sims, and Harold Richard Varner (of Sims–Varner).

The later years of Johnson’s career, were spent serving in many official capacities including the Director for the Detroit General Hospital, Commissioner for the Detroit Historic District Commission, & Commissioner for the Wayne County Planning Commission.

Johnson joined the American Institute of Architects (AIA) in Detroit in 1953. At the height of his career, he was a registered architect in 13 states. In 1965, he was the first African American architect to be appointed to the Detroit Board of Education. He won the AIA Detroit Gold medal in 2018. Johnson was a member of the BAG (Black Architects Group) and the Michigan Society of Architects.

== Late life and death ==
The firm of Nathan Johnson & Associates, Inc. ended work sometime around 2000. Johnson’s retirement was spent in his home in the historic Boston-Edison neighborhood, until his passing. He died on November 5, 2021 in Detroit, Michigan, at the age of 95.

== List of architecture work ==
=== Churches ===
- 1960, Grace Episcopal Church, 1926 Virginia Park Street, Detroit, Michigan
- 1962, Church of the Resurrection, Ecorse, Michigan
- 1962, Conant Gardens Church of Christ, 18480 Conant Street, Detroit, Michigan
- 1963, New Bethel Baptist Church (remodel of Oriole Theater), 8430 Linwood Street, Detroit, Michigan
- 1964, St. Clements Episcopal Church, 4300 Harrison Street, Inkster, Michigan
- 1968, Second Baptist Church (addition with Sims–Varner), Greektown, 441 Monroe, Detroit, Michigan
- 1968, Lomax Temple AME Zion Church, 17441 Dequindre Street, Detroit, Michigan
- 1974, Bethel AME Church Detroit, Tower and Townhouses (Bethel Tower and Town Homes, St. Antione Gardens), 5050 St Antoine, Detroit, Michigan

=== Other buildings ===
- 1957, House of Diggs Funeral Chapel, Dexter Street, Detroit, Michigan; owned by Charles Diggs
- 1958, Mercy General Hospital, 73 Russell Street, Detroit, Michigan
- 1959, Thunderbird Motel, Northville, Michigan
- 1962, Stanley Hong Residence, 961 West Boston, Detroit, Michigan
- 1969–1971, Stanley Mannia Café (or Stanley Hong’s Mannia Café), 249 E. Baltimore Avenue, Detroit, Michigan
- 1971, Belle Maison East (apartment complex), 8330 E. Jefferson Avenue, Detroit, Michigan
- 1971, Sherrard Jr. High School (addition), Chrysler Freeway near Euclid, Detroit, Michigan
- 1972, Eastland Center (remodel), Harper Woods, Michigan
- 1978, Colman A. Young Manor, Detroit, Michigan
- 1981, Shed 5, Eastern Market, Detroit, Michigan
- 1981, Wayne County Community College, Detroit, Michigan
- 1986, East Side Prison
- 1987, Detroit People Mover stations, Detroit, Michigan
- 1995, Wayne State University Towers, Detroit, Michigan

== See also ==
- African-American architects
- Black Bottom, Detroit
- AIA Gold Medal, a national award
