= SDG Associates =

American architecture firm

- Sims Design Group Associates LLC
- Formation: 1964; 62 years ago
- Founder: Howard Sims
- Type: Limited liability company
- Headquarters: 607 Shelby, Suite 704, Detroit, Michigan, United States
- Services: Architectural design, engineering, project management
- Key people: Howard Sims (1964–2016), Harold Varner (1973–2013)
- Website: sdg-assoc.com
- Formerly called: Howard Sims & Associates (1964–1975), Sims–Varner (1976–?)

Sims Design Group Associates LLC, often simplified as SDG Associates, is an American architectural firm, headquartered in Detroit, Michigan, U.S.. It is the city of Detroit’s oldest and largest Black-owned architecture firm. It was founded as Howard Sims & Associates, and later changed to Sims–Varner.

== History ==
Cobo Center (now Huntington Place) in Detroit, Michigan

It was founded in 1964 in Ann Arbor by architect Howard Sims under the name Howard Sims & Associates. In 1968 the office was moved to Detroit. In 1969, the firm incorporated and Sims was given the role of president. Architect Harold Varner joined the firm in 1973. By 1976, the firm name was changed to Sims–Varner to reflect a new Varner partnership, and Varner as the executive vice president. At the beginning of the firm they struggled to find high quality clients due to racial boundaries limiting them to certain types of work. These included residential buildings and churches like Second Baptist Church that created the base for the firms pedigree. Off of this the firm began to build their cliental leading to more noteworthy projects that shaped the city of Detroit like the design of Cobo Center in 1981.

It now operates as SDG Associates. As of 2019, Wesley Sims (son of Howard Sims) is the CFO and COO of SDG Associates.

== List of work by SDG Associates ==
Charles H. Wright Museum of African American History

- 1968, Second Baptist Church (addition with Nathan Johnson), Greektown, 441 Monroe, Detroit, Michigan
- 1973, Orleans East Apartments, 1531 East Larned, Lafayette Park, Detroit, Michigan
- 1974, Franklin Wright Village, corner of Lafayette and Chene in Elmwood Park in Detroit, Michigan
- 1985, Millender Center Apartments (now Renaissance City Apartments), 333 East Jefferson Avenue, Detroit, Michigan; with Ehrenkrantz, Echkstat & Whitelaw
- 1981, McMichael Middle School, Detroit, Michigan
- 1981–1989, and 2010–2015, Cobo Center (expansion and later renovation; now Huntington Place), 1 Washington Boulevard, Detroit, Michigan
- 1987, Stroh Brewery Company's River Place Inn (now Riverwalk Hotel Detroit), 1000 River Place Drive, Detroit, Michigan
- 1997–1998, Charles H. Wright Museum of African American History, 315 East Warren Avenue, Detroit, Michigan
- 2001, UAW–GM Center for Human Resources, 200 Walker Street, Detroit, Michigan; work done with Giffels Associates
- 2005, Detroit School for the Arts (now Detroit School of Arts)
- 2011, Detroit Wayne County Port Authority Terminal, Detroit, Michigan
- University of Michigan School of Social Work, Ann Arbor, Michigan
- Greektown Casino (now Hollywood Casino at Greektown), 555 East Lafayette Street, Detroit, Michigan
- Wayne County Community College District, downtown and northwest campuses
- Research Park Apartments (or Trumbull Crossing), 5500 Trumbull, Detroit, Michigan

== See also ==
- Hamilton Anderson Associates
