= Millender Center =

Mixed-use building complex in Detroit, Michigan, United States

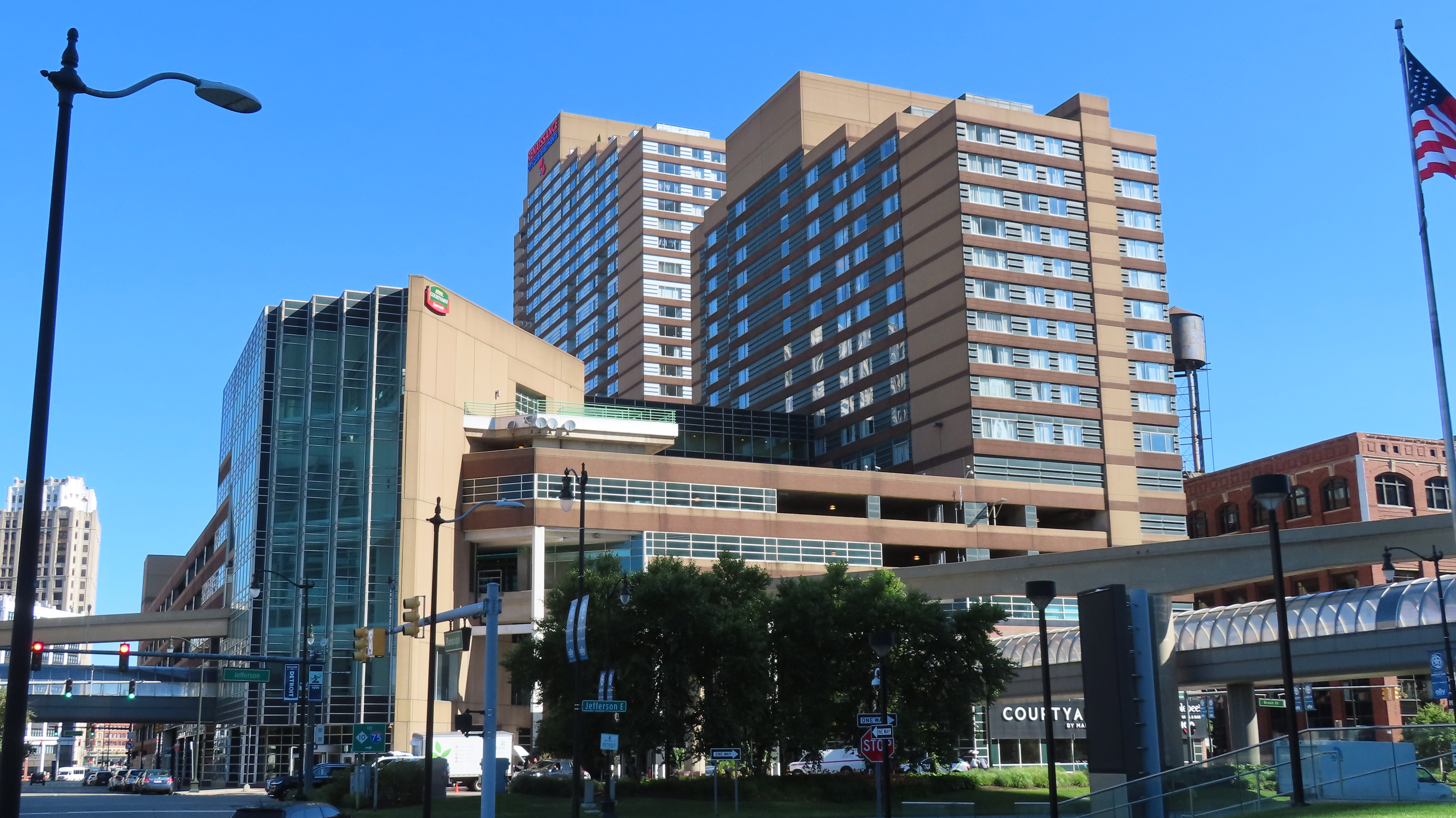
- Interactive map of the Millender Center area

General information
- Type: mixed-use residential high-rise hotel
- Location: 333 E Jefferson Avenue; Detroit, Michigan
- Coordinates: 42.3304°N 83.0426°W
- Completed: 1985
- Owner: Bedrock Detroit (atrium, garage, & hotel); City Club Apartments LLC (apartment tower)

Height
- Top floor: 332 ft (101 m) (apartment tower); 222 ft (68 m) (hotel tower)

Technical details
- Floor count: 33 (apartment tower); 20 (hotel tower)
- Floor area: 1,500,000 sq ft
- Lifts/elevators: 16

Design and construction
- Architects: Ehrenkrantz, Echkstat & Whitelaw with Sims–Varner & Associates (now SDG Associates)
- Developer: Forest City Enterprises

Other information
- Public transit access: Millender Center; DDOT 3, 5, 6, 9, 52, 67; SMART FAST Michigan, Woodward; SMART 255, 530, 620, 635, 805, 830, 851

The Millender Center is a mixed-use building complex in downtown Detroit, Michigan. The complex spans two city blocks, containing a retail atrium, Detroit People Mover station, and parking garage on its first seven floors, plus the 33-floor Renaissance City Club Apartments and a 20-floor, 265-room Courtyard by Marriott hotel. Developed by Forest City Enterprises and completed in 1985, the Millender Center is now mostly owned by Bedrock Detroit.

== History ==
=== Development and construction ===
First proposed by Mayor Coleman Young as the Jefferson-Randolph Project in 1978, the Center was renamed for Robert L. Millender, an activist and lawyer, shortly after his death in November of that year. The plans originally included a bus station on the ground floor, but these were quickly dropped. The city's Downtown Development Authority initially secured $96 million in funding, including $29 million from public sources, and signed Cleveland-based Forest City Dillon as a developer in 1981. Economic concerns stalled the project until 1983, when the State of Michigan invested $35 million in the project from its pension fund. Omni Hotels signed on to manage the hotel, and ground was broken on the complex on March 1, 1984, at a ceremony attended by Governor James Blanchard.

The complex was built rapidly using prefabricated components, an innovative technique pioneered by Forest City Dillon, allowing the addition of a new floor every two days. Ron Ratner, the company's executive vice president, claimed that it would be the tallest pre-cast concrete structure in the United States upon completion. During construction, artifacts over a century old, left by a previous owner, Jean Baptiste Ballenger, were discovered on the Millender Center grounds. Gun flints, bones, pots, and tax documents were excavated from the site.

=== Opening and early years ===
The Omni Hotel held its grand opening on October 20, 1985, and the Millender Center was formally dedicated the next day. Mayor Young and Governor Blanchard heralded the Center as a turning point in the city's redevelopment, and Ratner teased possible future Detroit development by Forest City Enterprises.

The opening of the Detroit People Mover in July 1987 included a station at the Millender Center, integrated into the atrium and façade on the fifth floor. The station includes a pottery mural by local African-American artist Alvin Loving Jr.

On April 1, 1996, the Omni Hotel was taken over and reflagged by DoubleTree Hotels.

=== General Motors occupancy; changes in ownership ===
Facing foreclosure, Forest City began leasing the Millender Center's hotel, parking garage, and retail space to General Motors in 1998. The complex began to integrate with the neighboring Renaissance Center, which GM had purchased two years prior. Later in 1998, the hotel was reflagged again, becoming a Courtyard by Marriott in November.

GM acquired the parking garage, atrium, and hotel from Forest City in 2010, having had the option to purchase the property in their lease agreement.

In 2013, Forest City sold the Millender Center Apartments tower to Farmington Hills-based Village Green Property Management, who renamed it Renaissance City Apartments the following year. In 2016, following a corporate split at Village Green, the tower's ownership was transferred to the spinoff company, City Club Apartments. It was rebranded Renaissance City Club Apartments in 2018, when a sign was added to the top of the tower.

Also in 2018, the Courtyard received a refreshed façade, and a dual-branded Applebee's/IHOP Express restaurant opened on the first floor, the first (and as of 2024, only) location to combine both of Dine Brands's restaurant brands. GM sold the Courtyard to Bedrock Detroit in July 2019.

Bedrock later acquired the remaining GM-owned portions, the retail atrium and parking garage, in June 2024. In May 2026, it was reported that Bedrock instructed all remaining retail tenants to vacate the complex by August. Per the report, the building's elevators and escalators have been in disrepair since Bedrock acquired the complex.

== Architecture ==
The complex was designed in the modern architectural style by Sims–Varner & Associates (now SDG Associates), the architecture firm of two of Detroit's noted 20th century Black architects, Howard Sims (1933–2016) and Harold Varner (1936–2013).

The seven-story atrium features a portrait of the Center's namesake, Robert L. Millender Sr., painted by distinguished Detroit artist Carl Owens, on its first floor. Skybridges link the Millender Center's second floor to the Coleman A. Young Municipal Center and the Renaissance Center, the latter of which is also connected by the People Mover.

== Awards ==
- SatisFacts - 2019 Resident Satisfaction Property Award Winner
- Webby Awards - 2018 Honoree for Website Functionality and Design
- Property Management Association of Michigan GLASTAR - 2014 Best Overall Marketing
- Detroit Metropolitan Apartment Association PRISM - 2014 Best Renovated Property

== Facts ==
This was Detroit's tallest residential tower from completion until the reopening of Broderick Tower Lofts in 2012.

== See also ==
- List of tallest buildings in Detroit
