= Coleman A. Young Municipal Center =

Coordinates: 42.3295°N 83.0442°W

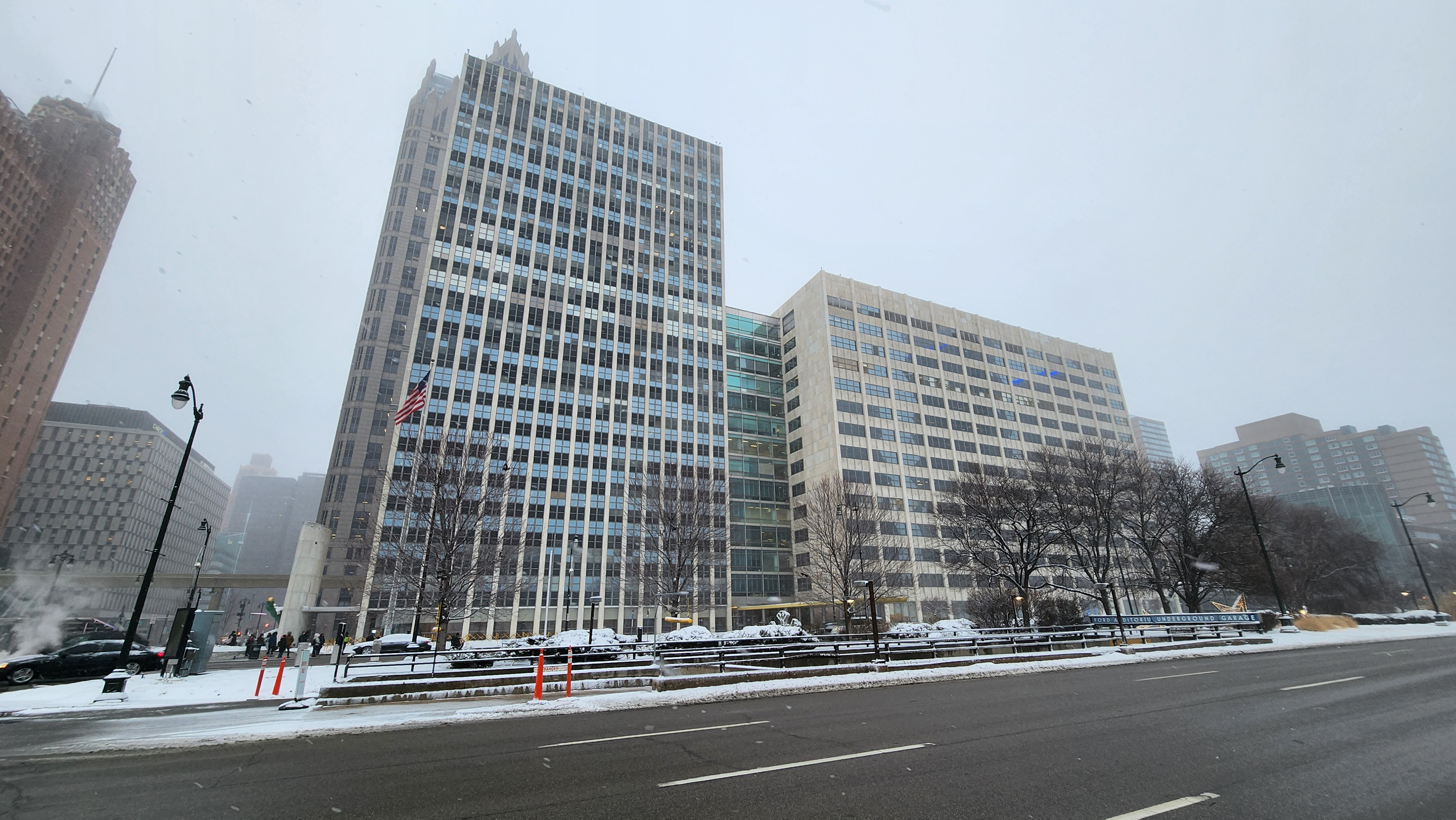
- Exterior in 2026
- Interactive map of the Coleman A. Young Municipal Center area

General information
- Type: City hall Courthouse
- Location: 2 Woodward Avenue; Detroit, Michigan
- Construction started: 1951
- Completed: 1954
- Operator: Detroit-Wayne Joint Building Authority

Height
- Roof: 318 ft (97 m)

Technical details
- Floor count: 20

Design and construction
- Architect: Harley, Ellington & Day

Other information
- Public transit: Millender Center; Congress Street; DDOT 3, 5, 6, 9, 40, 52, 67; SMART FAST Michigan 261, Woodward 461, 462, Gratiot 561

The Coleman A. Young Municipal Center (CAYMC, pronounced K-mac) is a government office building and courthouse in downtown Detroit, Michigan. It houses the headquarters of the government of the City of Detroit, as well as offices of the Wayne County government. It was completed in 1954 and originally named the City-County Building, and was renamed for the former mayor Coleman A. Young shortly after his death in 1997.

== Overview ==
The building is divided into two connected portions of different heights. The shorter and northernmost of the two, the Administration Tower, stands 197 ft (60 m) tall, and its 13 floors house offices of the city and county governments. The chambers of the Detroit City Council are located on the 13th floor. Its roof includes a garden.

The taller portion, known as the Courts Tower, is 318 ft (97 m) tall with 20 floors, and houses offices and courtrooms of the 3rd Circuit Court and the Wayne County Probate Court. It contains office space on floors 1 through 8, and courtrooms, judges' chambers, and jury rooms on floors 9 through 19, with the 20th floor housing the building's mechanical equipment.

The building is located between Jefferson Avenue and Larned Street. An enclosed skybridge connects the building to the Millender Center to the north, though entry through the bridge is restricted to employees. Southwest of the building is a former section of Woodward Avenue, which was pedestrianized and converted to Spirit Plaza, a small public square, in 2017.

== Architecture ==
The modernist International-style building was designed by the architectural firm of Harley, Ellington and Day. Construction began in 1951 and was completed in 1954. It is 20 floors tall, and including the basement has 21 total floors.

Three sides of the building's exterior are faced with white Vermont marble with black marble spandrel panels beneath the windows of the Courts Tower to emphasize the building's vertical lines. The verticality of the tower section, with its white marble-clad piers and dark spandrels, offers a distinct contrast with the 14-story Administration Tower office section, in which horizontal lines are emphasized. The brick of the Randolph Street facade was not covered with marble to allow for a more economical future expansion.

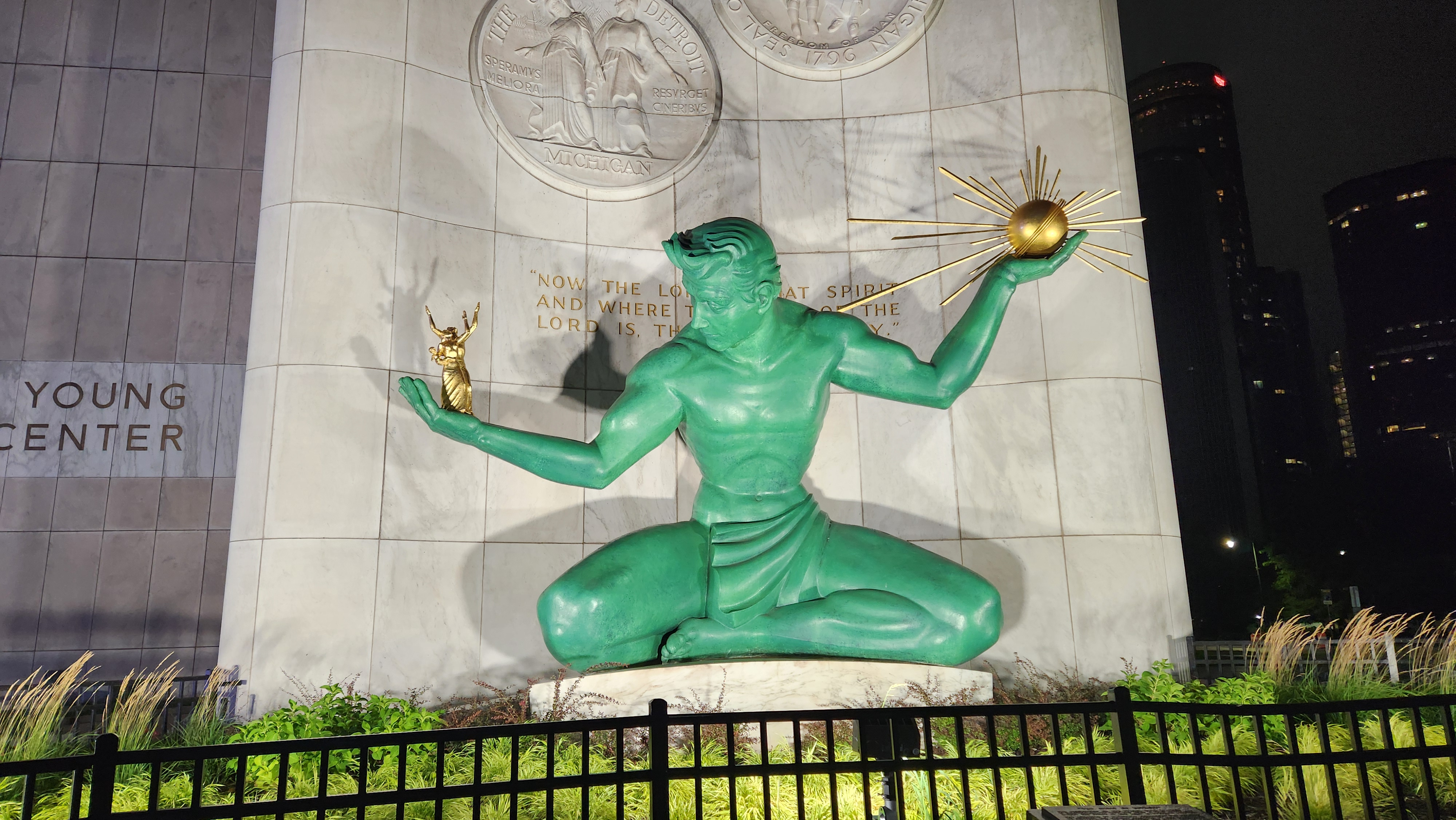
The Spirit of Detroit by sculptor Marshall Fredericks

=== Statue ===
Outside the southwestern entrance to the Courts Tower stands The Spirit of Detroit, a monument including a 43.5-foot (13.3 m) marble wall and a bronze statue, created by sculptor Marshall Fredericks. The wall includes bas reliefs of the seals of Detroit and Wayne County, along with a quote from the Bible. A canopy extends from the marble wall to the entrance.

The statue is a major landmark in Detroit and is widely recognized as a symbol of the city, and depictions of the statue frequently appear in city branding.

== Operations ==
The Coleman A. Young Municipal Center is owned and operated by the Detroit-Wayne Joint Building Authority, an intergovernmental authority which was created in 1948 by the Michigan Legislature.

When it opened, the City-County Building replaced both the historic Detroit City Hall and Wayne County Building. Many Wayne County offices have since moved to the nearby Guardian Building which now serves as the county's headquarters. The offices of the Wayne County Clerk remain in the building as does one division of the Wayne County (Third Judicial) Circuit Court, Circuit Court Administrative Offices and the Wayne County Probate Court.

On June 28, 2008, the building was struck by lightning during a series of intense thunderstorms, and caused a transformer fire within the building. It re-opened for service on July 9, 2008. The smoke and fire damage was easily visible across the river in Windsor, Ontario.
