= Robert L. Millender Sr. =

American lawyer

Robert L. Millender Sr. (1916–1978) was an attorney, a rights activist in the city of Detroit and political campaigner, best known for his drive to improve the representation of African Americans in political leadership.

== Biography ==
As a young attorney Robert Millender forged and successfully ran the political campaigns of a great many African-American politicians. Most noted are former Secretary of State Richard Austin, Congressman John Conyers and Mayor Coleman Young.

The University of Rochester Millender Fellowship was established in memory of Robert. L. Millender. Wayne State University runs the Robert L. and Louise Millender Memorial Lecture. In early 1980s the Millender Center was named in honor of Robert Millender's contributions to Detroit.
