= Bogart Leashore =

American sociologist, social worker, and academic administrator

- Born: Bogart Raymond Leashore Jr. August 31, 1947
- Died: June 26, 2007 (aged 59); Selma, Alabama, U.S.
- Education: Xavier University of Louisiana; Howard University; University of Michigan
- Scientific career
- Fields: Social work, urban studies, child welfare
- Workplaces: Howard University; Hunter College
- Doctoral advisor: Richard A. English

Bogart Raymond Leashore Jr. (August 31, 1947 – June 26, 2007) was an American sociologist, social worker, and academic administrator who served as the dean of the Hunter College school of social work from 1991 to 2003. He was previously the associate dean of the Howard University school of social work.

== Life ==
Leashore was born on August 31, 1947, to Vashtie and Bogart Leashore Sr. He was raised in Selma, Alabama and graduated from St. Elezabeth's School and the St. Jude Educational Institute in 1964. Leashore completed a B.A. in sociology with a minor in social sciences from Xavier University of Louisiana in 1968. As an undergraduate, he served as president of the Chi Sigma Sigma sociology society and editor of the Sociological Mirror.

In 1968, Leashore was awarded a US$1,800 (equivalent to $16,665 in 2025) plus tuition from the National Institute of Mental Health to attend the Howard University school of social work, specializing in psychiatric social work. Leashore subsequently earned a master's degree. Leashore served as a social work practitioner at the Howard University Hospital. He worked as a foster care worker in Washington, D.C. focusing on family reunification. He earned a Ph.D. in social work and sociology from the University of Michigan School of Social Work in 1979. His dissertation was titled, Interracial Households in 1850-1880, Detroit, Michigan. Richard A. English was his doctoral advisor.

Leashore's scholarly focus included social justice, cultural diversity, and child welfare practice. He was a research associate at the Howard University institute for urban affairs and research. At the institute, he was director of a summer project focusing on faculty in minority colleges and universities in urban public transportation research. Leashore later served as the director of the urban studies master's degree program. In 1985, he was appointed by Richard A. English as the associate dean of the school of social work. In 1991, he edited the book, Child Welfare: An Africentric Perspective with Sandra Stukes Chipungu and Joyce E. Everett. From 1991 to 2003, he served as the dean of the Hunter College school of social work. Leashore worked as a consultant after his retirement. He died on June 26, 2007, from an illness in his home in Selma, aged 59.
