= Marquette Building (Detroit) =

- U.S. Historic district – Contributing property
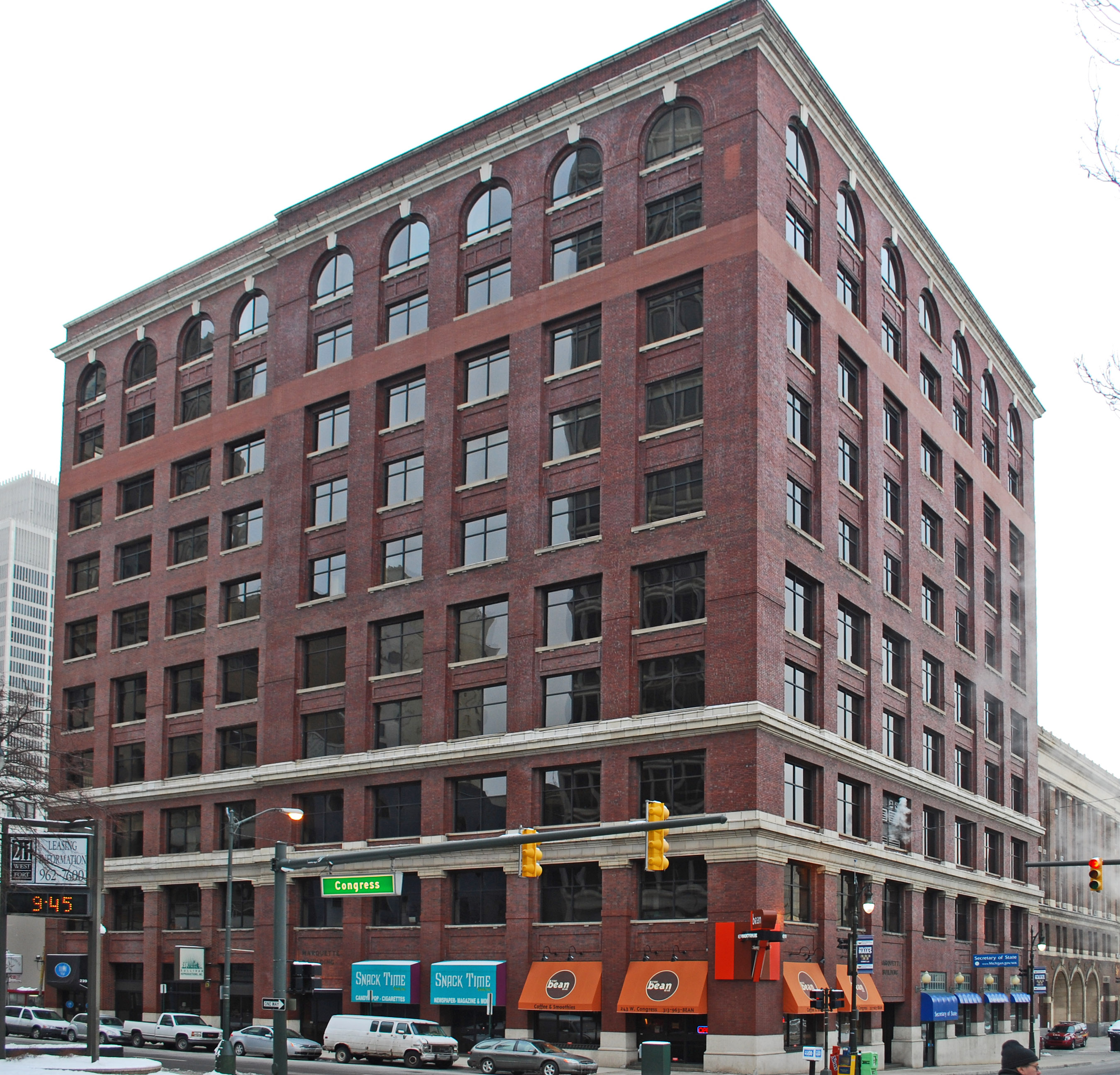
- Location: 243 West Congress Street; Detroit, Michigan
- Coordinates: 42°19′43.5″N 83°2′55″W
- Part of: Detroit Financial District (ID09001067)
- Designated CP: December 14, 2009

The Marquette Building is a historic building located in downtown Detroit, Michigan. It was built in 1905, and stands at 243 West Congress Street. 211 West Fort Street lies to the north, TCF Center to the west, Fort Pontchartrain a Wyndham Hotel to the south, and Fort Shelby Hotel to the east. The building was for a time owned by Mexican billionaire, Carlos Slim.

The high-rise stands at 10 stories in height, and is used for retail, offices, and a restaurant. It was designed in the Chicago School architectural style, and is mainly made of brick.

This building formerly contained the Office of the Michigan Secretary of State on its ground floor. 400 Monroe Associates saved this building from demolition in 1979, completing a careful historic preservation redevelopment in 1982.

Adient Plc announced on Wednesday, November 30, 2016, it had acquired the building to house the headquarters of its global seating business. Those plans have been cancelled as of June, 2018.

The building is now owned by Detroit-based real estate company Sterling Group which plans on leasing the space.
