= Joyce Finley Garrett =

American diplomat

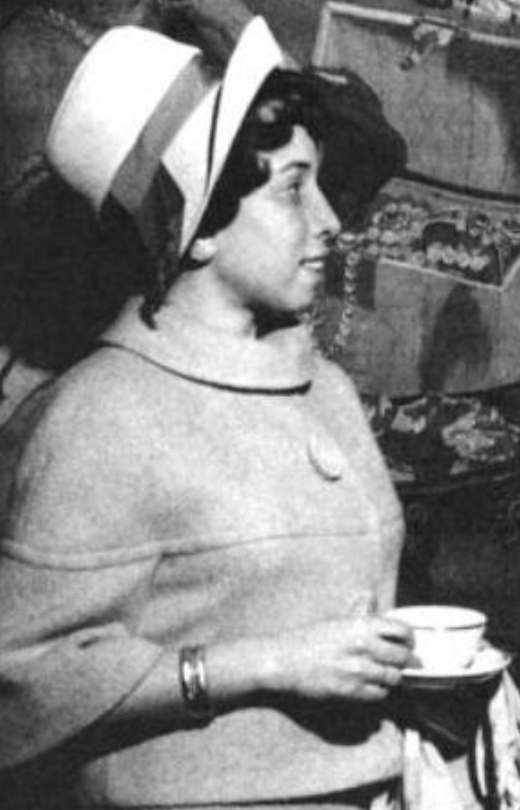
- Joyce Finley Garrett, from a 1962 publication of the US Department of State
- Born: August 16, 1931; Detroit, Michigan
- Died: September 27, 1997 (aged 66); Detroit, Michigan
- Occupation(s): Diplomat, city official

Joyce Finley Garrett (August 16, 1931 – September 27, 1997) was an American diplomat and Detroit city official. She was the first Black woman to serve as an American foreign service officer, when she became Vice-Consul at the United States consulate in Caracas in 1962. In the 1970s she was "Detroit's Unofficial First Lady" during the tenure of Mayor Coleman Young.

== Early life and education ==
Joyce Finley was born in Detroit, the daughter of Thomas A. Finley and Mary Elsie Fleming. After her parents' divorce, she was raised in the home of an aunt and uncle in Cleveland. She attended Smith College, where her education included a junior year abroad in Switzerland. She graduated from Smith in 1953. She earned a master's degree in political science in 1966, at Wayne State University.

== Career ==
Garrett worked for the Wayne County government for several years after college. She passed the Foreign Service examination in 1962, and was sent to Caracas, Venezuela as Vice Consul, the first Black woman to serve as an American foreign service officer. She only stayed a year, then left the Foreign Service. She was assistant director of the Michigan Civil Rights Commission from 1967 to 1969, and director of the Wayne County Office of Human Relations from 1969 to 1974. She ran for Wayne County commissioner in 1967 and 1972. When her partner Coleman Young became mayor of Detroit in 1973, she became the city's unofficial first lady. She was executive director of the Detroit Bicentennial Commission from 1974 to 1977, and had other city jobs after she and Young ended their personal relationship.

== Personal life ==
Finley married Nathan Taylor Garrett in 1953, right after her college graduation. They had a daughter, before they divorced in 1957. She had a twelve-year personal relationship with politician Coleman Young, ending in 1980. Joyce Finley Garrett died in 1997, aged 66 years, from complications of Behçet's disease.
