= Child Welfare: An Africentric Perspective =

1991 book

Child Welfare: An Africentric Perspective is a 1991 book edited by Sandra Stukes Chipungu, Joyce E. Everett, and Bogart Leashore. The book was reviewed in the Journal of Marriage and Family. The 1994 edition of the book was reviewed in Social Work. It was reviewed in H-Net. A 2005 edition was reviewed in The Journal of Sociology & Social Welfare.
