= Detroit Economic Club =

American debate organization

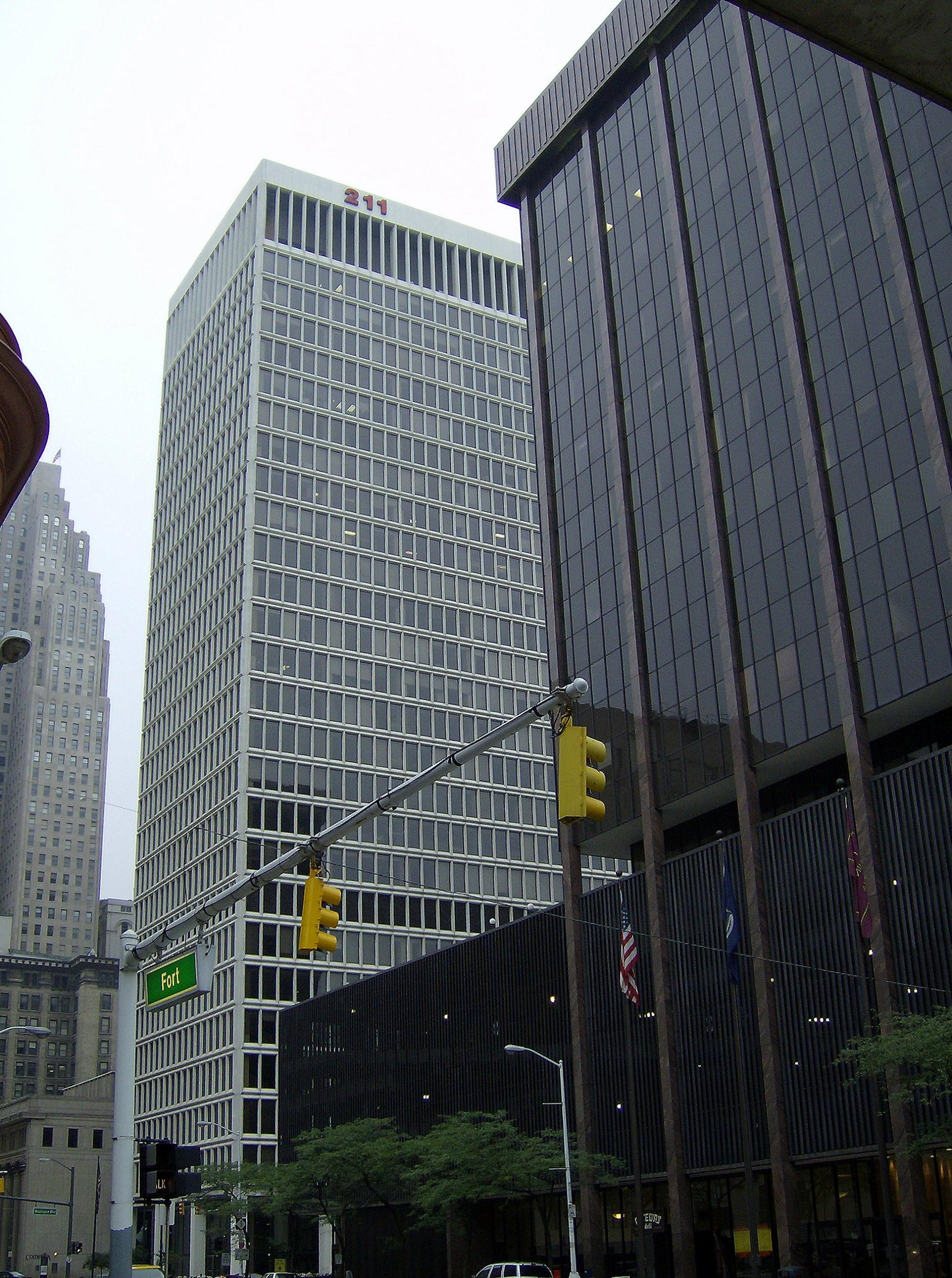
Metro area business leaders belong to the Detroit Economic Club, headquartered at 211 West Fort Street.

The Detroit Economic Club, headquartered at 211 West Fort Street in downtown Detroit, Michigan, was formed in 1934 as a platform for the discussion and debate of business, government and social issues. It hosts speakers from business, academic, and government officials, who address members and their guests at the Club's 35-meeting season, to its 3,500 members. The DEC has hosted every sitting U.S. President since Richard Nixon.

== History ==
The Detroit Economic Club was founded in 1934 by Allen Crow. The objective of the Club was to promote an interest in, and to enlighten its members on governmental, economic and societal issues. In the first year, 275 men joined. Women were not admitted until 1973 after Michigan ratified the Equal Rights Amendment. Within five years of the inception, the Club's membership had grown to 1,100 and post World War II the membership was approaching 2,000. The logo of the Club is an Aladdin's Lamp, which Crow selected because it was the Greek symbol for enlightenment.

== Operation ==
The main activity of the club is usually in the form of a breakfast or lunch business meeting. The club presents, on average, 35 meetings per year where the speaker(s) takes the podium/stage and addresses whatever their topic is. Speakers usually speak for about 20–30 minutes and there are reserved times for networking and questions. Traditionally, the club met on Mondays. Beginning back before commercial air travel, the meetings were scheduled by Allen Crow on Mondays so that the speakers could travel to Detroit by train over the weekend to conserve their weekly business time. Originally the annual dues were $5.00 and tickets were $1.50. Currently the club has five categories of membership, ranging from Young Leader dues at $75.00 to Gold Membership at $500.00. The club meets at some of the same venues that it did in its early history, such as the Book Cadillac Hotel (now the Westin Book Cadillac). Later a number of the club's meetings took place at Cobo Hall, which is still a principal location.

== Speakers ==
In the early days, speakers were paid, but this practice was and speakers now come because for the prestigious forum and the outreach. In addition to the newspaper coverage that the speakers receive, a number of radio stations use to broadcast the meetings, and was carried to about 400,000 Metro-Detroit area homes. There is still the newspaper and radio coverage, but also live streams for viewers. The club has hosted a meeting with every President of the United States since former President Nixon. The first woman speaker at the DEC was Catherine Curtis on November 1, 1937, and she spoke on "The Housewife as Capitalist." The first Black speaker was Lester Granger, President of the National Urban League, on January 19, 1948. Other speakers include Soviet Ambassador to the U.S. Antoly Dobrynin, Bruno Kreisky when he was the Austrian Chancellor, and Ambassador of the Republic of Cuba to the U.S. Jose Ramon Cabanas Rodriguez.

== Presidents ==
The president of the club, historically, was the chief operating officer as well as the president. Nowadays, those titles and tasks are handled by two separate individuals. Since the first president and founder, Allen B. Crow, there has been nine others. Lester Skene Bork, Walker Lee Cisler, (who was also one of the founding members of the National Academy of Engineering) Russel A. Swaney, Theodore H. Mecke, Jr., Wesley R. Johnson, (also served as President of Woodall Industries and Libbey Owens Ford Plastics before retiring and serving the DEC) Gerald E. Warren, William R. Halling, (served on the Board of Directors for: Compuware and KPMG, LLP and also the third-longest presidential term for the club) and Elizabeth "Beth" Chappell, who served the Club for 15 years, which is the second longest term after the Founder, Allen B. Crow.

The current president and CEO of the club is Steve Grigorian, who has served since 2017.

== Young Leader Program ==
The Young Leader Program membership is made up of over 1,200 young professionals out of the Metro-Detroit area. All YL members are under the age of 40 years. YL members are allowed to attend regular DEC meetings, but also have meetings of their own, in addition to hosting an annual Young Leader Conference.

== Career Readiness Academy (CRA) ==
The Detroit Economic Club’s Career Readiness Academy is a 6-month program that brings high school and Young Leader (YLs) members together for monthly meetings that aim to teach skills that will help the students navigate their high school journey and forges mentor-mentee relationships. The monthly sessions are broke up into 6 groups, specifically to educate these students on career exploration, economic realities, college, and a number of other amazing tools that they will need as they work their way into the career path of their liking.

== National summit ==
In June 2009, the DEC hosted a summit on Technology, Energy, Environment, and Manufacturing.

== See also ==
- Detroit Athletic Club
- Economy of metropolitan Detroit
- Detroit Club
