= Harley Ellis Devereaux =

Architecture and engineering firm

HED
- Type: Corporation
- Industry: Architecture, Engineering, Planning, Interior Design, Landscape Architecture, Construction Services
- Founded: 1908; 118 years ago
- Founder: Alvin Harley and Norman Atcheson
- Headquarters: Royal Oak, Michigan, United States
- Number of locations: Royal Oak, Michigan; Chicago, Illinois; Los Angeles, California; Sacramento, California; San Francisco, California; San Diego, California; Denver, Colorado; Dallas, Texas; Boston, Massachusetts
- Key people: J. Peter Devereaux, CEO
- Services: Architecture, Engineering, Planning, Landscape Architecture
- Number of employees: over 400
- Website: www.hed.design

HED (formerly Harley Ellis Devereaux) is an architecture and engineering firm based in Royal Oak, Michigan with additional offices in Boston, Massachusetts, Chicago, Illinois, Dallas, Texas, Denver, Colorado, Sacramento, San Francisco, Los Angeles, and San Diego, California. The firm was founded in 1908 by architects Alvin E. Harley and Norman S. Atcheson.

== Activities ==
HED is one of the 200 largest design firms in the United States, employing more than 400 professionals including architects; mechanical, electrical, and structural engineers; landscape architects; interior designers; graphics, signage, and equipment designers; and laboratory design specialists. The firm specializes in multiple practices including healthcare, workplaces, mixed-use and residential, Pre K-12 schools, higher education, civic and cultural, mission critical, science and advanced manufacturing, community, and federal and transportation.

== HED buildings ==
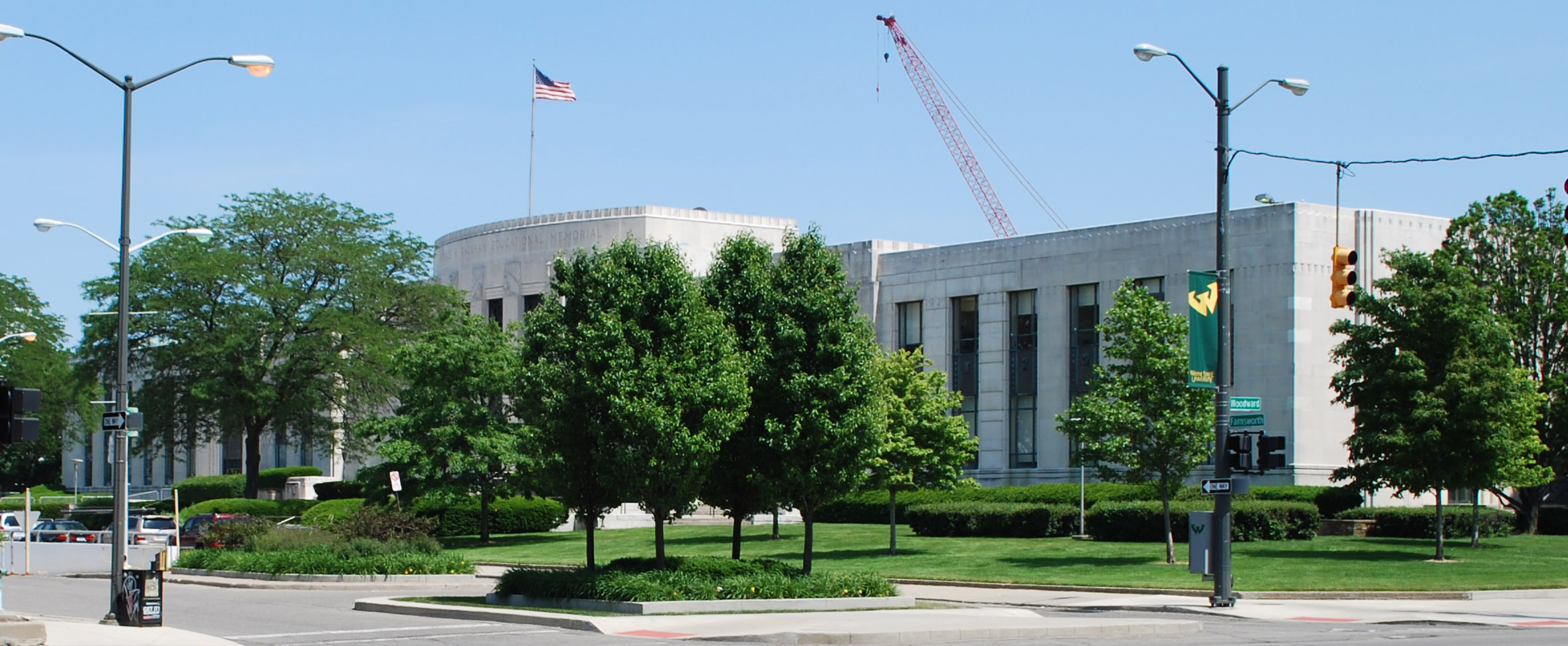
Rackham Memorial Education Building (1941) in Detroit's Cultural Center Historic District by Harley, Ellington and Day

- Horace Rackham Education Memorial Building, Detroit, 1941
- City-County Building, Detroit, 1954
- U.S. State Department Building, Washington, D.C., 1960
- 211 West Fort Street, Detroit, 1963
- Union Bank Office Tower, San Jose, California, 1976
- Wharton Center for Performing Arts, Michigan State University, East Lansing, Michigan, 1982
- University of Michigan Chemical Sciences Building, Ann Arbor, Michigan, 1988
- General Motors Truck Product Center, Pontiac, Michigan, 1996
- VA Medical Center, Ann Arbor, Michigan, 1998
- Wentworth Commons, Chicago, 2005
- Millennium Park Program Management, Chicago, 2006
- Hertzberg-Davis Forensic Science Center, Los Angeles, 2007
- USC Village, Los Angeles, 2017
- The Archdiocese of Detroit buildings, 1970

== Office locations ==
- Royal Oak, Michigan
- Chicago, Illinois
- Los Angeles, California
- Sacramento, California
- San Diego, California
- San Francisco, California
- Dallas, Texas
- Denver, Colorado
- Boston, Massachusetts

== History of firm names ==
Since its inception in 1908, the firm has been called:

- Harley and Atcheson (1908–1912)
- Alvin E. Harley, Architect (1912–1932)
- Harley and Ellington (1933–1942)
- Harley, Ellington and Day (1943–1960)
- Harley, Ellington, Cowin and Stirton (1961–1968)
- Harley Ellington Associates (1969–1972)
- Harley Ellington Pierce Yee Associates (1973–1994)
- Harley Ellington Design (1995–1999)
- HarleyEllis (2000–2005)
- HED (Harley Ellis Devereaux) (2006–present)

== Awards ==
- Chicago's 101 Best and Brightest Companies To Work For, 2005–2021
- ZweigWhite, Hot Firm List, 2003, 2004, 2005, 2006, 2007
- Top Ten Green Projects, AIA COTE, West Branch of the Berkeley Public Library, 2016
- Top Ten Green Projects, AIA COTE, Lake View Terrace Library, 2004
- Metropolitan Detroit 101 Best and Brightest Companies To Work For, 2001–2021
- AIA Michigan Firm of the Year, 2000
