= Harold Varner (architect) =

American architect (1935–2013)

- Born: Harold Richard Varner; August 22, 1935; Detroit, Michigan, United States
- Died: December 14, 2013 (aged 78); Detroit, Michigan, United States
- Education: Lawrence Institute of Technology
- Occupation: Architect
- Spouse: Nancy Elizabeth Hunter (m. 1960–2013; death)
- Children: 2
- Awards: Fellow of the American Institute of Architect (1981)
- Buildings: Charles H. Wright Museum of African American History (1985)

Harold Richard Varner, FAIA, (1935–2013) was an American architect, active in Detroit. Varner was a leader within the Black architectural firm Sims–Varner (now known as SDG Associates).

== Early life and education ==
Harold Richard Varner was born on August 22, 1935 in Detroit, Michigan. He graduated from Cass Technical High School in Detroit. Varner attended Lawrence Institute of Technology (now Lawrence Technological University) and graduated with a B.S. degree in architectural engineering (1965).

He was married to Nancy Elizabeth Hunter, and they had two daughters.

== Career ==
In 1967, Varner became a licensed architect in the state of Michigan.

He joined the architectural firm Howard Sims & Associates in 1973; the firm was founded in 1964 by Black architect Howard Sims in Detroit. By 1976, the firm name was changed to Sims–Varner to reflect a new Varner partnership, and Varner was named as the executive vice president. He designed (with Sims–Varner) many notable buildings and structures including the Charles H. Wright Museum of African American History (1985); University of Michigan School of Social Work (1997); and the Millender Center station (1987), a Detroit People Mover station and sky bridge.

Varner was part of the AIA National Housing Committee, from 1970 until 1973. In the 1970s, Varner was interested in modifying the government run apartment subsidy plans (like HUD's section 236). Varner served on the Michigan State Licensing Board for Architects, from 1978 until 1991. When he stepped down from the state licensing board role, he warned of potential issues with unlicensed builders in Michigan.

He was honored as a Fellow of the American Institute of Architects in 1981. He served as an honorary Consul General to the Republic of Côte d'Ivoire, West Africa.

Varner died after a long illness on December 14, 2013 at Harper University Hospital in Detroit.

== Awards and honors ==
Varner won the following awards

- Lambda lota Tau Award, Academic Excellence, 1963
- Alumni Achievement Award, Lawrence Technological University, 1971
- Black Alumni Excellence Award, Lawrence Technological University, 1980
