= St. Mary Roman Catholic Church (Detroit) =

Historic church in Michigan, United States

- U.S. Historic district – Contributing property
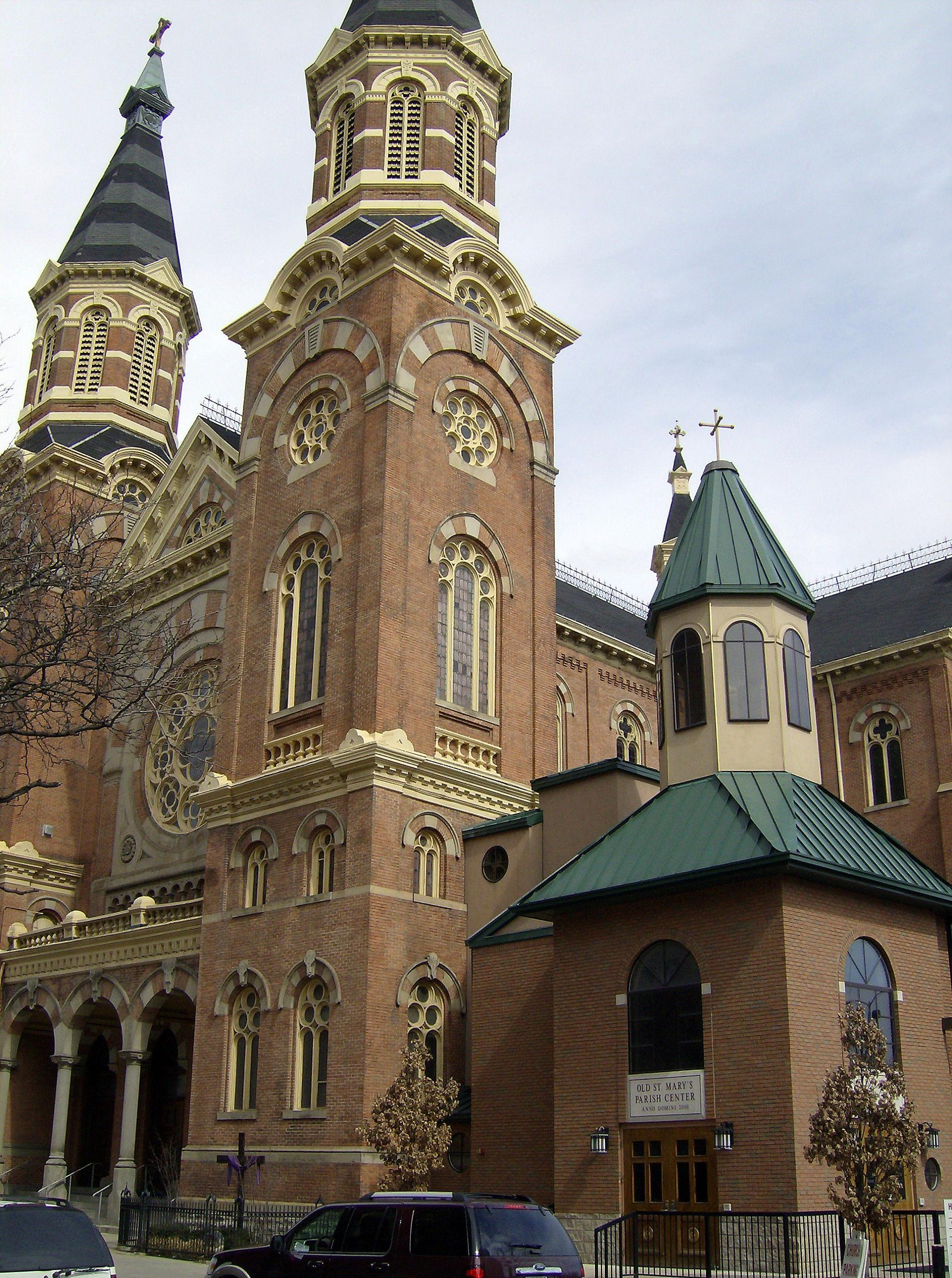
- Location: 646 Monroe Street; Detroit, Michigan
- Coordinates: 42°20′6″N 83°2′32″W
- Architect: Peter Dederichs
- Architectural style: Pisan Romanesque
- Part of: Greektown Historic District (ID82002902)
- Added to NRHP: May 6, 1982

St. Mary Roman Catholic Church, formally the Church of the Immaculate Conception of the Blessed Virgin Mary, is in the third oldest Roman Catholic parish in Detroit, Michigan. Designed by German-born Peter Dederichs and built for the formerly ethnic German parish of the 19th century, it is located at 646 Monroe Street in what is now considered the heart of the Greektown Historic District in downtown Detroit. It is often called "Old St. Mary's Church" to avoid confusion with other St. Mary's parishes in the Redford neighborhood of Detroit or in nearby Royal Oak, Monroe, or Wayne.

The former church was built in 1841. The school, built in 1868, was the first of the new buildings of the current complex. The rectory (1876); new church (1884–1885), and convent, completed in 1922, comprised the remainder. The convent was demolished in the early 2000s and replaced with a community center designed to resemble the 1841 church building.

St. Mary Parish has been staffed by the Spiritans or Holy Ghost Fathers since 1893. It was previously administered by the Franciscan Fathers (1872–1893) and the Redemptorist Fathers (1847–1872).

== History ==
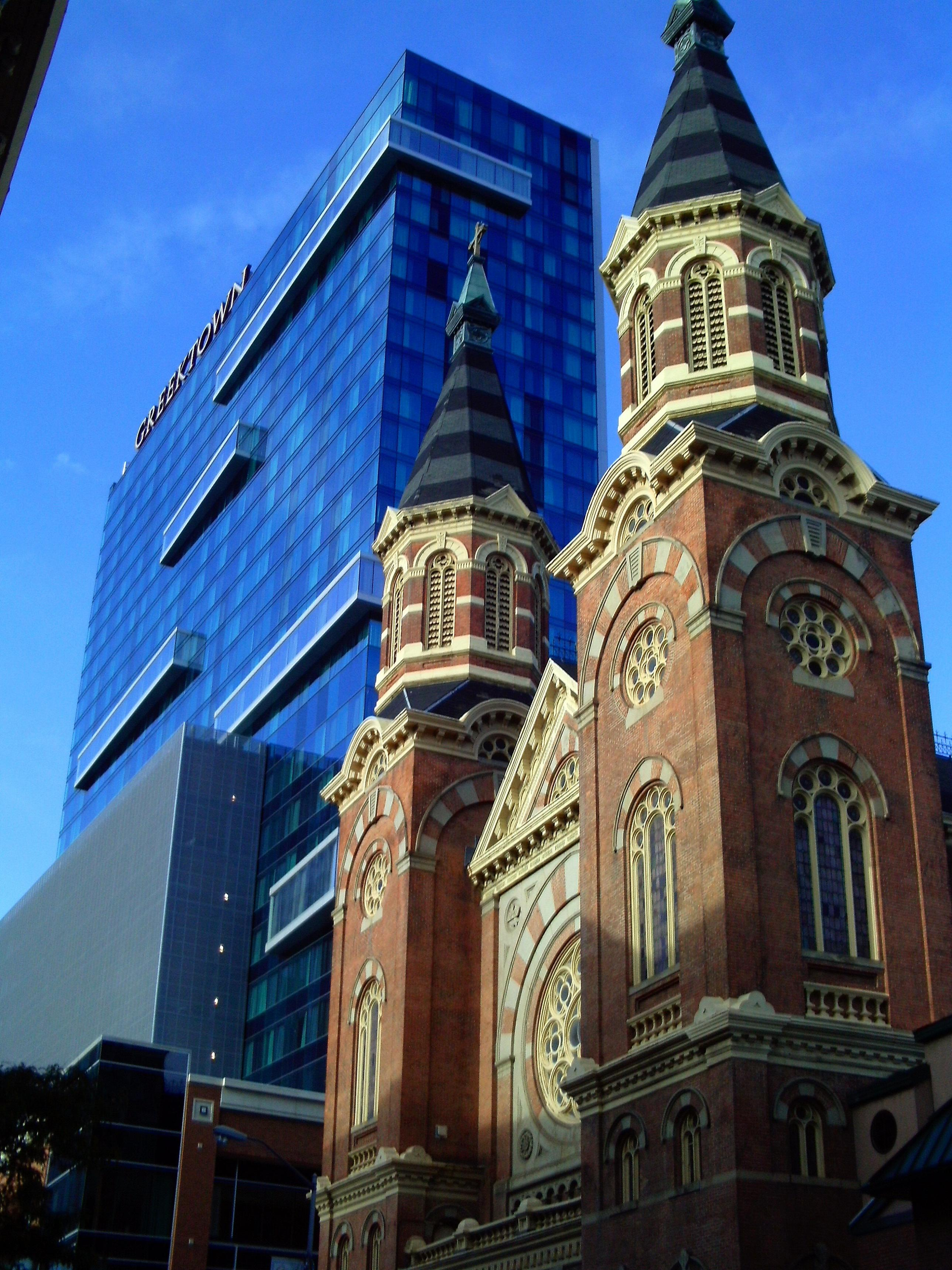
Saint Mary Roman Catholic Church in Detroit's Greektown Historic District

The parish was founded in 1834 by Father Martin Kundig to serve the German-speaking Catholic immigrants who settled in this part of the city. The first church was constructed in 1841 at this site on land sold to Bishop Peter Paul LeFevere for one dollar by Antoine and Monica Beaubien, two of the area's early ethnic French settlers. The materials for the church cost an additional $239. The Beaubiens also donated four bells for the new church.

The cornerstone for the current structure was laid in 1884, and it was completed in 1885. Its German-born and trained architect, Peter Dederichs, was a parishioner of the Church; he also designed the nearby Sacred Heart Church.

In the early twentieth century, Father Joseph Wuest, Pastor of Old St. Mary's, had three grottos constructed at the rear of the church. One is the Baptistry on the Epistle side of the building. It depicts the scene described in the Canonical Gospels of the Baptism of Jesus. Next to the Baptistry is a replica of the Shrine of Lourdes. Within this grotto is an altar where weekly mass is celebrated. Older members of the church say that Father Wuest collected the rocks he used in the construction during a trip to Lourdes, France. On the opposite side of the church is the third grotto, which depicts the scene in the Garden of Gethsemane the night before the crucifixion of Jesus.

Rev. John A. Lemke, born in Detroit on February 10, 1866, to Polish immigrants from Prussian Poland, was baptized at St. Mary's on February 18, 1866. After graduating from Detroit College and studying at St. Mary's Seminary in Baltimore, Maryland, in 1889 he returned to Detroit and was the first native-born Roman Catholic priest of Polish descent to be ordained in the United States. He died of illness in 1890.

St. Mary's School opened in 1844 with lay teachers. The Christian Brothers began teaching male upperclassmen in 1852, and the School Sisters of Notre Dame assumed responsibility for teaching the girls and younger boys. The building was replaced in 1855, and the current building, designed by Pius Daubner, was erected in 1868. The school operated until 1966.

The church, school, and rectory were listed as Michigan Historic Sites in 1979, and markers were erected at all three.

== Architecture ==
The church is constructed of red brick in the Romanesque style, with Venetian accents. The west façade is dominated by twin towers which frame a large rose window. The Romanesque-Venetian style was also used for the rectory and former convent. The church is 176 ft (54 m) long. The nave is 80 ft (24 m) wide and reaches a height of 90 ft (27 m).

A striking feature of the church interior is the ten polished granite columns that divide the main and side aisles. The columns are each cut from a single piece of granite. They were originally intended for the Michigan State Capitol building then under construction in Lansing. For unknown reasons, the columns were not used in the Capitol. The church purchased all ten for only $4,625, bringing the total construction cost to $81,210.

== See also ==
- Roman Catholic Archdiocese of Detroit
- Architecture of metropolitan Detroit
- Greektown Historic District
