= 211 West Fort Street =

Skyscraper in Downtown Detroit, Michigan

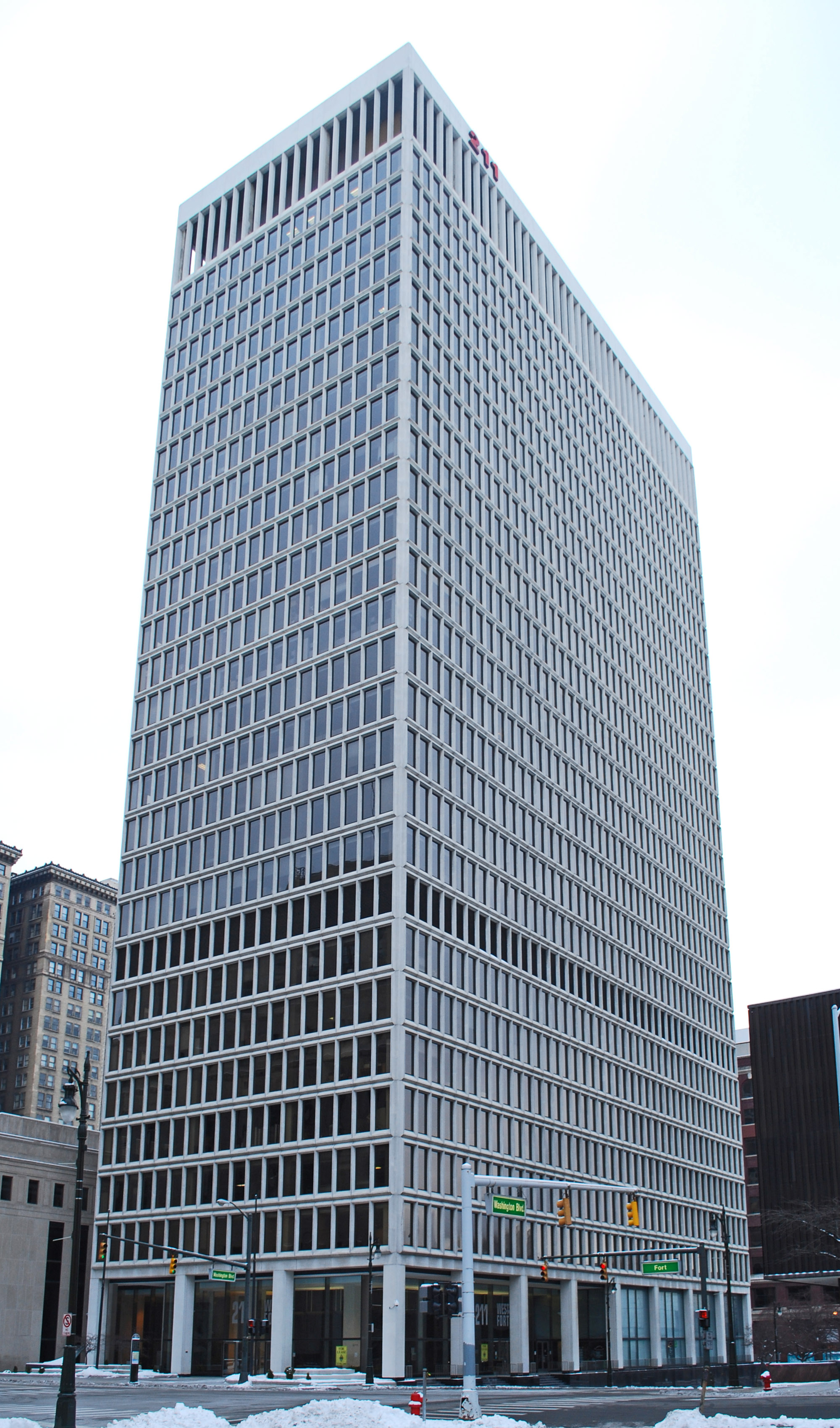
- The building in 2010
- Interactive map of the 211 West Fort Street area

General information
- Status: Completed
- Type: Office
- Location: 211 West Fort Street; Detroit, Michigan
- Coordinates: 42°19′47″N 83°2′56″W
- Construction started: 1961
- Completed: 1963

Height
- Roof: 367 ft (112 m)

Technical details
- Floor count: 27
- Floor area: 562,027 sq ft (52,214.0 m^{2})

Design and construction
- Architects: Harley, Ellington, Cowin & Stirton

Other information
- Public transit: Fort/Cass

Website
- https://www.211westfortstreet.com/

211 West Fort Street is a 27-story office tower in Downtown Detroit, Michigan, currently owned by Tribus LLC, a family-owned office in Grosse Pointe, Michigan. Construction began in 1961, and finished in 1963. The building stands at the southeast corner of Fort Street and Washington Boulevard. It was constructed adjacent to the Detroit Trust Company Building, designed by Albert Kahn in 1915, as offices for the Detroit Bank and Trust Company, later known as Comerica. The bank occupied space in the building until 1993, when it moved to One Detroit Center. In the courtyard between the two buildings is a sculpture based on the bank's logo at the time.

The building currently houses offices for the Detroit Economic Club, U.S. Bankruptcy Court for the Eastern District of Michigan, Visit Detroit, Majorel, the U.S. attorney, and several other tenants.

== Architecture ==
The building was designed in the International style by architects Harley, Ellington, Cowin & Stirton in 1961. Tinted windows set into precast concrete frames create a unique grid pattern along the sweeping building façade. The building's address, "211", is displayed along the roof line.

A dynamic two-story lobby is wrapped with glass and recessed on the north and west sides, allowing for a covered arcade on two sides. Elevator banks and interior walls are covered with black granite and floors gleam with travertine tiles. Rosetti Architects was commissioned to redesign the lobby. The site slopes from north to south, allowing for a service entrance and parking garage at street level facing Congress Street.

== Gallery ==
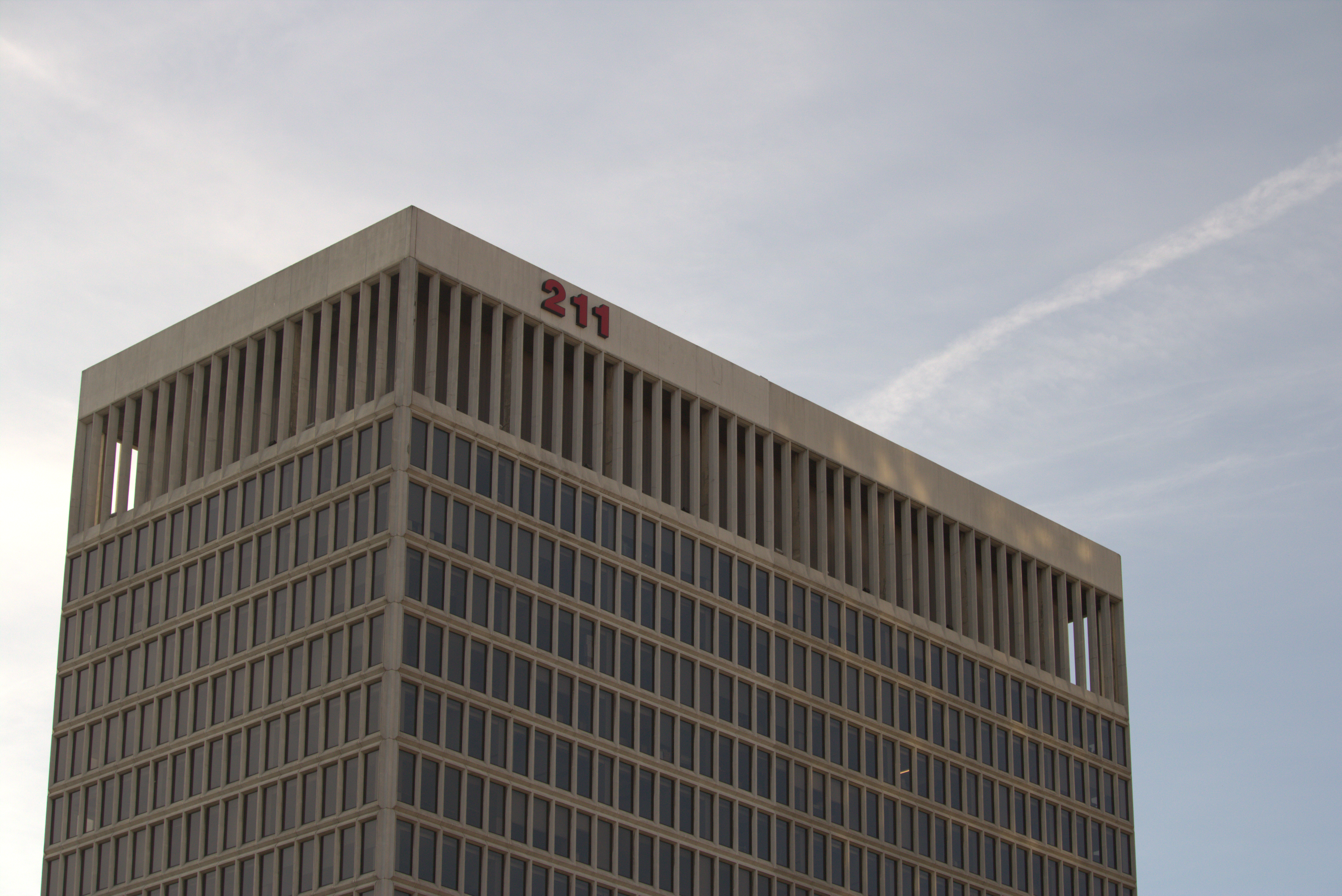
Detail of 211 West Fort St from the top of the Buhl Garage

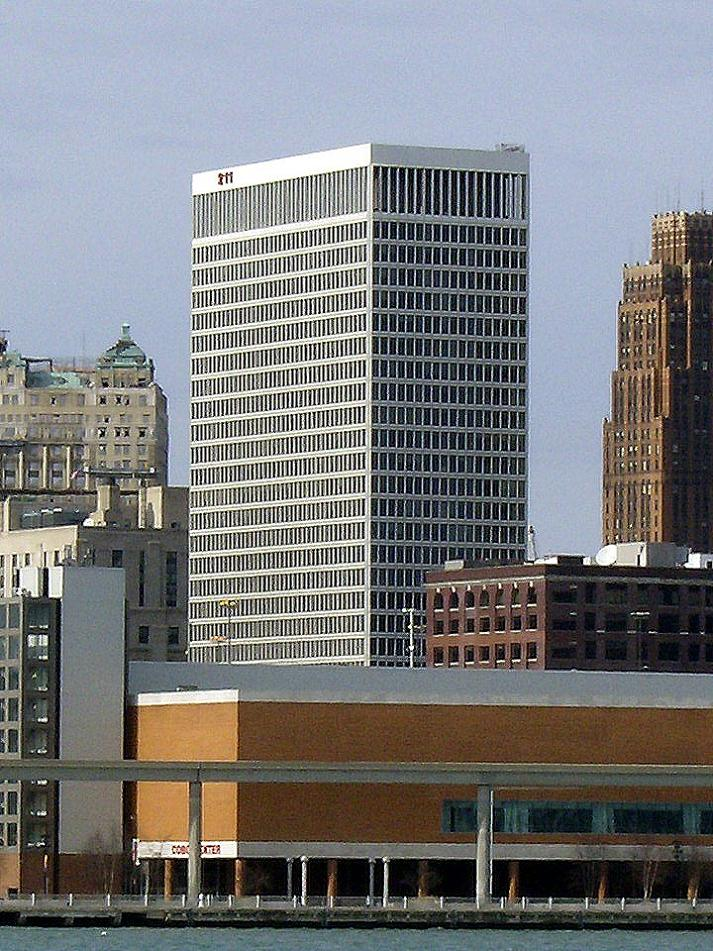
211 West Fort Street, as seen from Windsor, between the Westin Book-Cadillac Hotel (left) and the David Stott Building (right). Cobo Center and the Marquette Building are in the foreground.

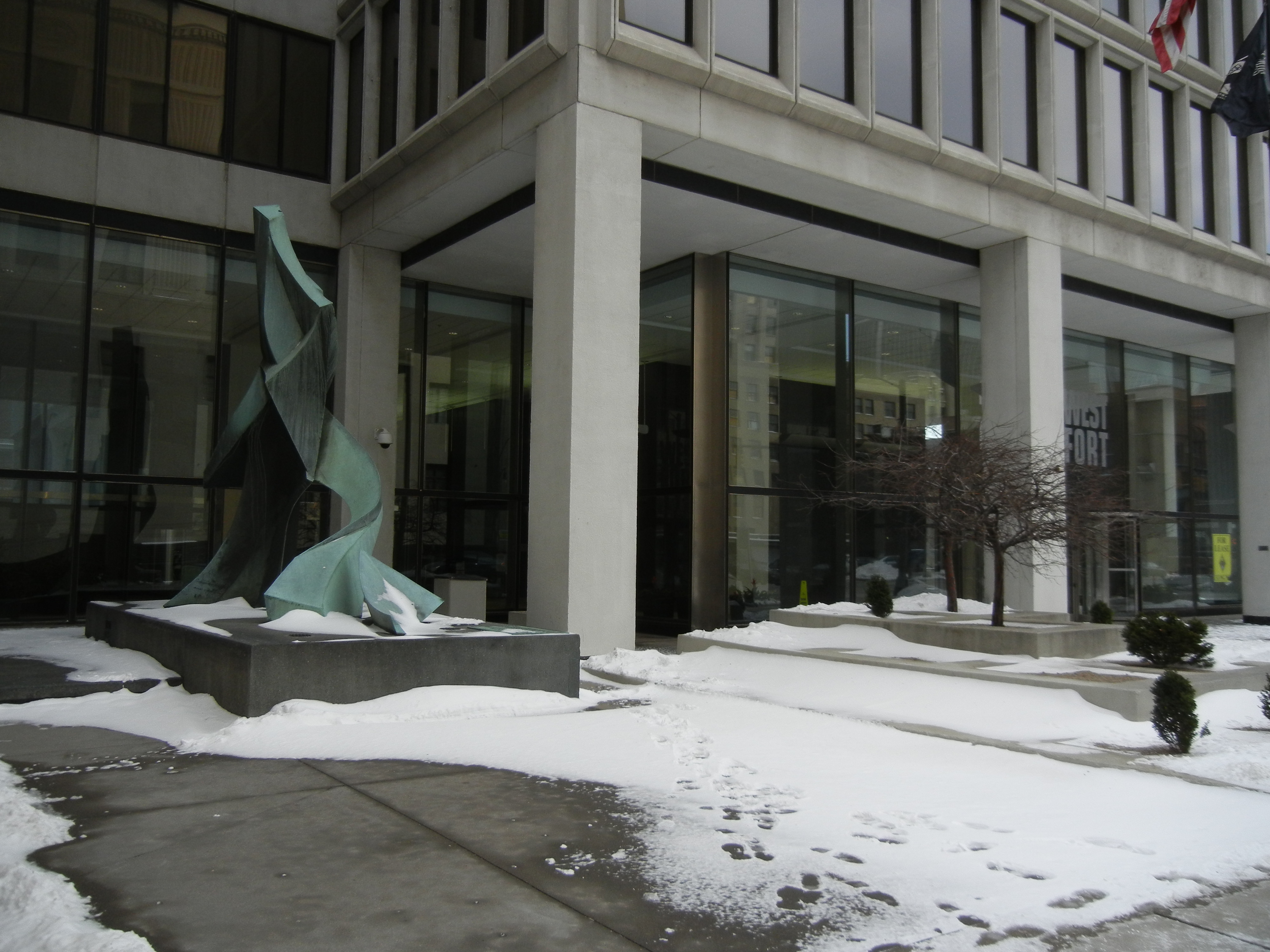
Sculpture and entrance plaza

== See also ==
- List of tallest buildings in Detroit
