= Second Baptist Church (Detroit) =

Historic church in Michigan, United States

- Second Baptist Church Of Detroit
- U.S. National Register of Historic Places
- U.S. Historic district – Contributing property
- Michigan State Historic Site
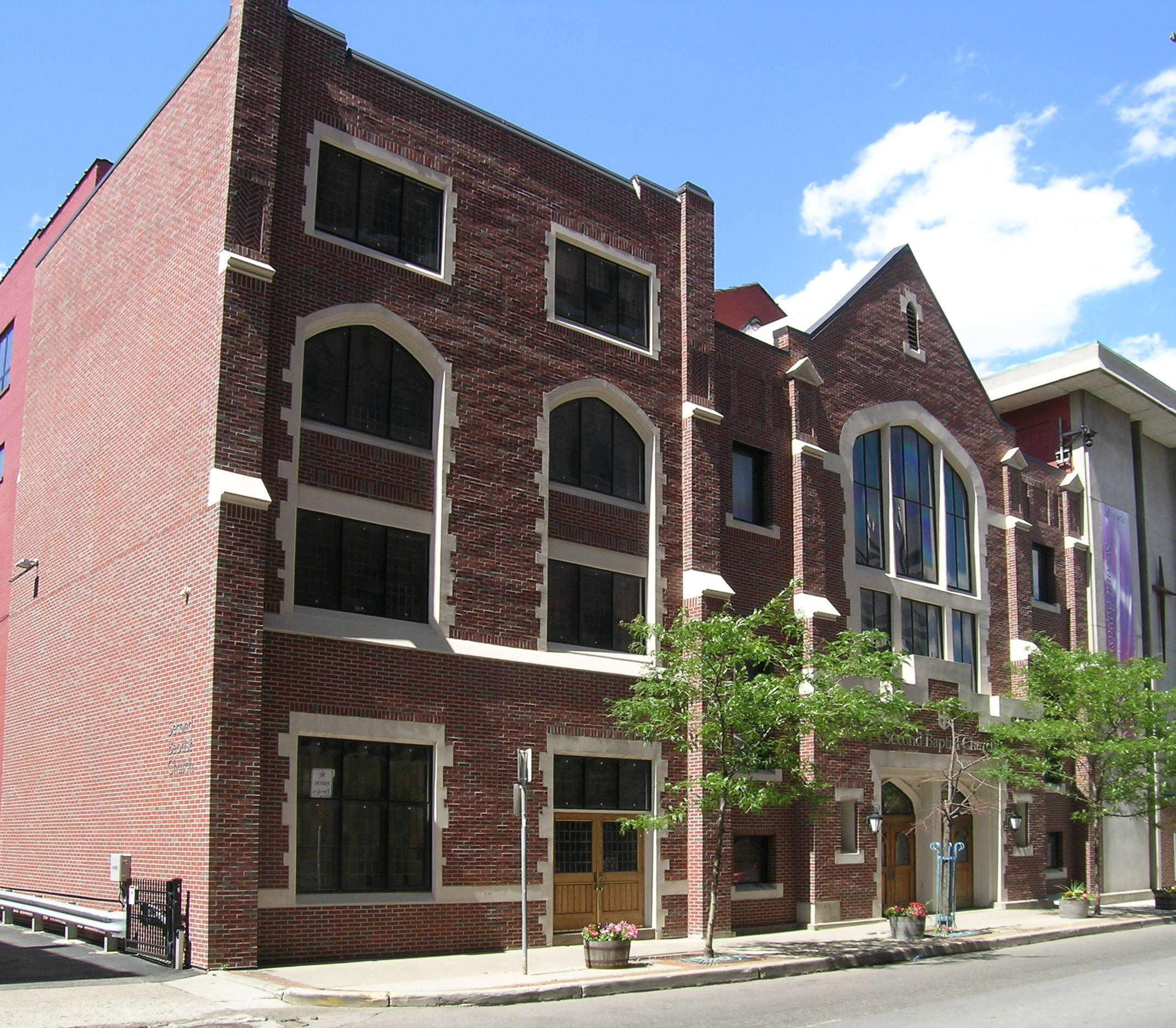
- Interactive map
- Location: 441 Monroe Street; Detroit, Michigan
- Coordinates: 42°20′5.61″N 83°2′36.36″W
- Built: 1914; 1926, 1968 (additions)
- Architect: William E. N. Hunter
- Architectural style: Gothic Revival, Brutalist
- Part of: Greektown Historic District (ID82002902)
- NRHP reference No.: 75000970

Significant dates
- Added to NRHP: March 19, 1975
- Designated CP: May 06, 1982
- Designated MSHS: September 17, 1974

The Second Baptist Church, located at 441 Monroe Street within Greektown in Detroit, Michigan, is the oldest African-American church in the Midwestern United States. It was designated a Michigan State Historic Site in 1974 listed on the National Register of Historic Places in 1975.

== History ==
The church was organized in March 1836 by 13 former slaves who left the First Baptist Church due to discrimination. Second Baptist was Detroit's seventh major church. With the Detroit River and Canada's border only a thousand yards away, the Second Baptist Church quickly undertook the mission of helping free slaves and constructed a room under the sanctuary where escaping slaves stayed until they could continue their journey. Church leaders assisted in creating the Amherstburg Baptist Association and the Canadian Anti-Slavery Baptist Association, each of which were abolitionist groups in Canada. From its founding until the end of the Civil War, the church served as a "station" on the Underground Railroad, hosting some 5,000 slaves before their eventual departure to Canada.

Second Baptist also opened the city's first school for black children in 1839, and in 1843 and 1865 hosted a "State Convention of Colored Citizens" to petition the Michigan government for Negro Suffrage. Ralph Bunche, who later became the first African-American to receive the Nobel Peace Prize, was baptized in the church. Second Baptist was instrumental in the formation of over 30 other African-American churches.

== Building ==
The current building was erected in 1914 and contains three floors. It replaced an earlier structure which was destroyed by fire. Additions to the building were made in 1926 and 1968 and flank the original structure. The 1914 and 1926 buildings are brick with Gothic Revival accents in limestone.

The footprint of the 1914 building is rectangular with a gabled roof. The facade is dominated by a large lancet window with wood tracery. Below the window twin entrance doors inside gothic arches are framed by a crenellated parapet.

The 1968 addition is in the Brutalist style and has four floors by Nathan Johnson. Horizontal bands of windows wrap the second and third floors with fourth floor windows set into a grille of precast concrete. Below the windows of the second and third floors are precast concrete panels that also wrap the structure. The flat roof extends several feet on all sides to form a broad cornice.

== Current status ==
The Second Baptist Church is a member of the predominantly black Progressive National Baptist Convention and of the predominantly white American Baptist Churches in the USA. Reverend Lawrence W. Rodgers is the Senior Pastor, the 24th person to hold that position at Second Baptist.

== See also ==
- List of Underground Railroad sites
