= Millender Center station =

Detroit People Mover station

Millender Center
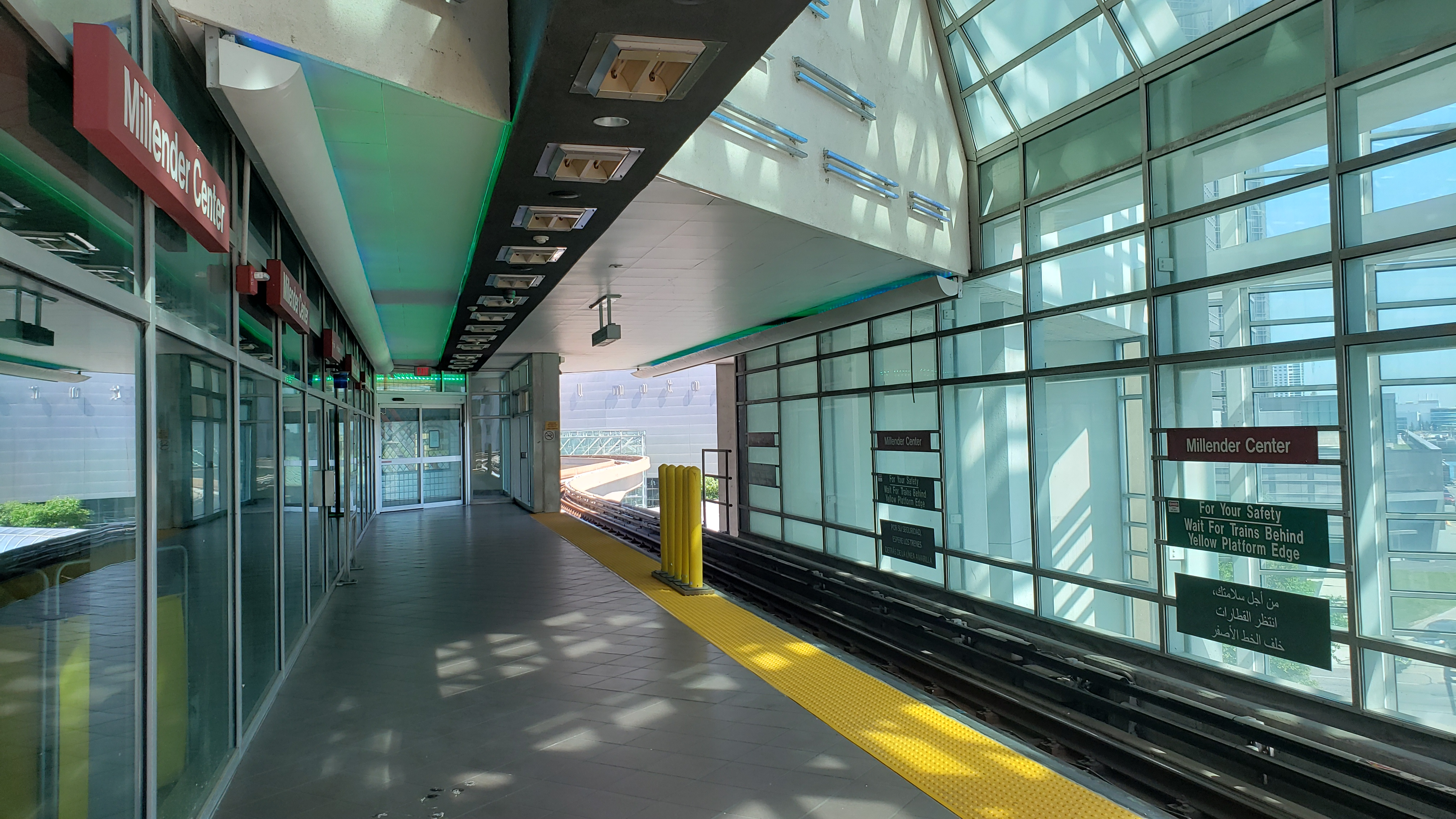

General information
- Location: 333 E Jefferson Avenue, Floor 5 Detroit, Michigan 48226; United States
- Coordinates: 42°19′49″N 83°02′31″W
- Owner: Detroit Transportation Corporation
- Platforms: 1 side platform
- Tracks: 1
- Connections: DDOT 3, 5, 6, 9, 16, 40, 52, 67; SMART FAST Gratiot, Michigan, Woodward; SMART 805, 830, 851

Construction
- Structure type: Elevated
- Accessible: yes

History
- Opened: July 31, 1987

Passengers
- 2014: 96,255
- Rank: 8 out of 13

Services
Preceding station	Detroit People Mover	Following station
Financial District One-way operation	Detroit People Mover	Renaissance Center Next counter-clockwise
Location

Millender Center station is a Detroit People Mover station in Downtown Detroit, Michigan. It is located inside of the Millender Center, on the building's fifth floor, with elevators and escalators inside the building connecting the station to street level.

Millender Center is the nearest People Mover station to the Coleman A. Young Municipal Center, Mariners' Church, the Detroit-Windsor Tunnel, the Wayne County Building, and Cadillac Square. A skybridge connects the Millender Center to an employees-only entrance to the Municipal Center; public access is only available from the street. A second skybridge connects to the Renaissance Center, which also has its own People Mover station.

As of 2026, the street and skybridge entrances to Millender Center station close nightly at 8:00 p.m., though riders may still exit.

== Public art ==
Detroit New Morning, a tile mosaic created by Detroit-based painter Alvin Loving Jr., spans the station lobby and the fifth floor of the Millender Center's atrium. Created at Pewabic Pottery, the work is composed of 5,000 tiles, and was painted with brooms.

In 2010, color-changing LED lights were added to the platform.
