= Howard Sims (architect) =

American architect (1933–2016)

- Born: Howard Francis Sims; July 25, 1933; Detroit, Michigan, United States
- Died: March 31, 2016 (aged 82); Arizona, United States
- Burial place: Woodlawn Cemetery, Detroit, Michigan, United States
- Education: University of Michigan
- Occupations: Architect, businessperson, philanthropist
- Notable work: SDG Associates
- Spouse: Judith Perry
- Children: 4

Howard Francis Sims, FAIA (1933–2016), was an American architect, businessperson, and philanthropist, active in Detroit. He founded the architecture firm SDG Associates (formerly Howard Sims & Associates, and later Sim–Varner). Sims helped design the state of Michigan's first construction code. He was a leader in business and sat on various boards. Sims established multiple college scholarships to support Black students in pursuing architecture.

== Early life and education ==
Howard Francis Sims was born on July 25, 1933, in Detroit, Michigan. He graduated from Northwestern High School (now Detroit Collegiate Preparatory Academy at Northwestern). In 1951, Sims joined the United States Navy, where he served in the construction battalion during the Korean War.

He attended the University of Michigan where he received a B.Arch degree, 1963; and a M.Arch degree, 1966.

Sims married Judith Perry, and they had four children. His wife was a Detroit public school teacher.

== Career ==
In 1964, Sims established his first architectural Howard Sims & Associates in Ann Arbor, Michigan, and by 1968 moved their office to Detroit. The firm was incorporated in 1969, and Sims became president. Architect Harold Varner joined the firm in 1973. By 1976, the firm name was changed to Sims–Varner to reflect a new partnership with Varner, and Varner serving as the executive vice president. It is now known as Sims Design Group Associates (or SDG Associates). His notable building design (through his firm) include Millender Center Apartments (1985), and Charles H. Wright Museum of African American History (1997).

In 1973–1975, Sims was worked collaboratively to help design Michigan's first construction code; he was part of the Michigan Construction Code Commission, a nine-person team appointed by Gov. William Grawn Milliken.

In 1979, Sims was elected chairman of the board of directors for the Detroit branch of the Federal Reserve Bank of Chicago. He was also a board member at the W.K. Kellogg Foundation, Comerica, DTE Energy, and the Ascension St. John Hospital. He served as a co-chairman of the Citizens Education Committee, and co-chair of "Task of Force on Education" within the City of Detroit's Strategic Plan.

Sims was a director of the National Organization of Minority Architects (NOMA), and a director of the Detroit chapter of the AIA. He was a member of the Michigan Society of Architects, the Michigan BAG (Black Architects Group), and the Engineering Society of Detroit.

== Late life and death ==
He established a few of scholarships, including one at Lawrence Technological University, Wayne State University, and Oakland University. The Howard and Judith Sims Merit Scholarship at Taubman College of Architecture and Urban Planning at the University of Michigan was established in 1983, to encourage and support Black students to study architecture.

The last three years of his life he was mostly retired, and was living in Arizona. Sims died from a heart attack on March 31, 2016, at the age of 82.

== Awards and honors ==
He was elected a Fellow of the American Institute of Architects in 1977. In 1988, Sims was awarded a Gold Medal from the Detroit Chapter of AIA. In 1989, Sims received an Honorary Doctorate of Public Service from Eastern Michigan University.

== See also ==
- African-American architects
