= Greektown, Detroit =

- Greektown Historic District
- U.S. National Register of Historic Places
- U.S. Historic district
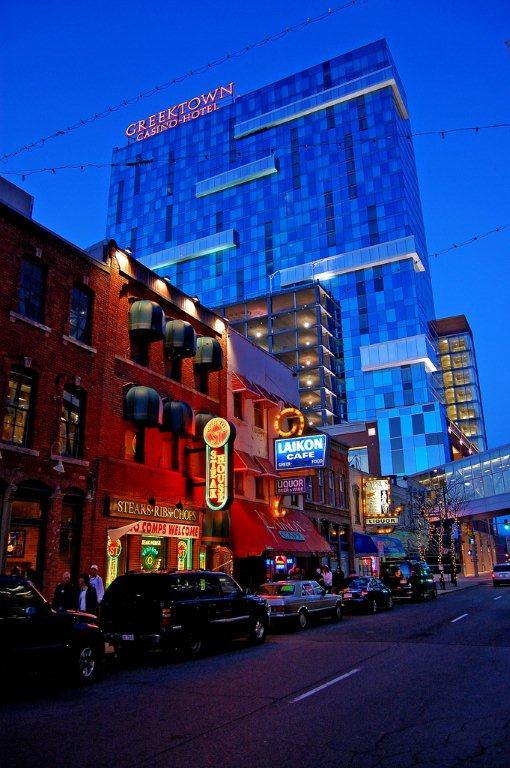
- Greektown at night
- Interactive map
- Location: Detroit, Michigan, U.S.
- Coordinates: 42°20′6″N 83°2′32″W
- Architect: Multiple
- Architectural style: Late Victorian, Renaissance, Romanesque
- NRHP reference No.: 82002902
- Added to NRHP: May 06, 1982

Greektown is a commercial and entertainment district in Detroit, Michigan, United States, located northeast of Downtown Detroit, along Monroe Avenue between Brush and St. Antoine streets. It has a station by that name on the city's elevated downtown transit system known as the Detroit People Mover. Greektown is situated between the Renaissance Center, Comerica Park, and Ford Field.

Named for the historic Greek immigrant community of the early 20th century, the district still has Greek-themed restaurants. Notable buildings include Annunciation Greek Orthodox Cathedral, St. Mary Roman Catholic Church (originally built for the former ethnic German congregation of the parish), Second Baptist Church, the Atheneum Suite Hotel, and the contemporary Hollywood Casino at Greektown (formerly Trapper's Alley, opened in 1972 by Frances and David Sonne) within its boundaries. The district was listed on the National Register of Historic Places in 1982. The district is the site of the annual Detroit Greek Independence Day Parade.

== History ==
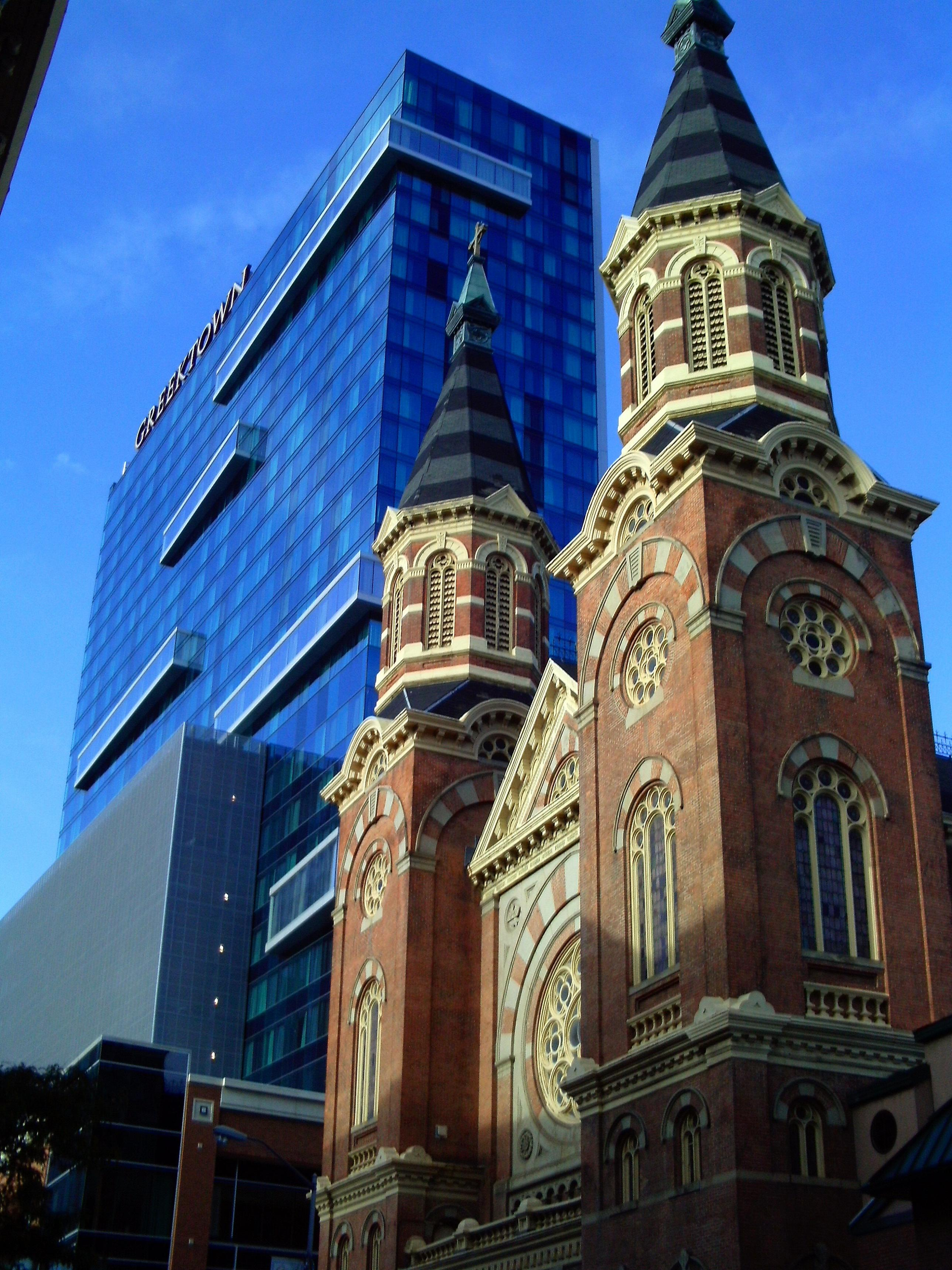
Greektown Casino Hotel with St. Mary's Church in the foreground

The area known today as Greektown was first settled in the 1830s by German immigrants, who created a primarily residential neighborhood in the area. However, in the earliest years of the 20th century, most of the ethnic German residents, who had gotten established in the city, began moving from the neighborhood into newer residential areas farther from downtown. As they left, a new wave of Greek immigrants moved into this older housing. Theodore Gerasimos was the first documented Greek immigrant in Detroit. The newly arrived Greeks soon established their own businesses in the neighborhood.

By the 1920s, the area was developing more commercial structures, and the Greek residents began moving out in turn to newer housing. But the restaurants, stores, and coffeehouses they established remained. The next thirty years brought a melange of immigrants to the few residential spaces left in the neighborhood. Redevelopment in the 1960s led to the neighborhood becoming the site of new municipal buildings and parking.

Realizing the culturally significant neighborhood was at risk, Detroit's ethnic Greek leaders banded together. With the help of the Mayor's office, the streetscape and building exteriors were improved, and additional street lighting was installed. The neighborhood threw a Greek festival in 1966, timed to coincide with Fourth of July celebrations. The festival was a success, and was continued for years until turnout grew too large. By that time, Greektown was firmly established in Detroit. The Greektown Historic District was listed on the National Register of Historic Places in 1982.

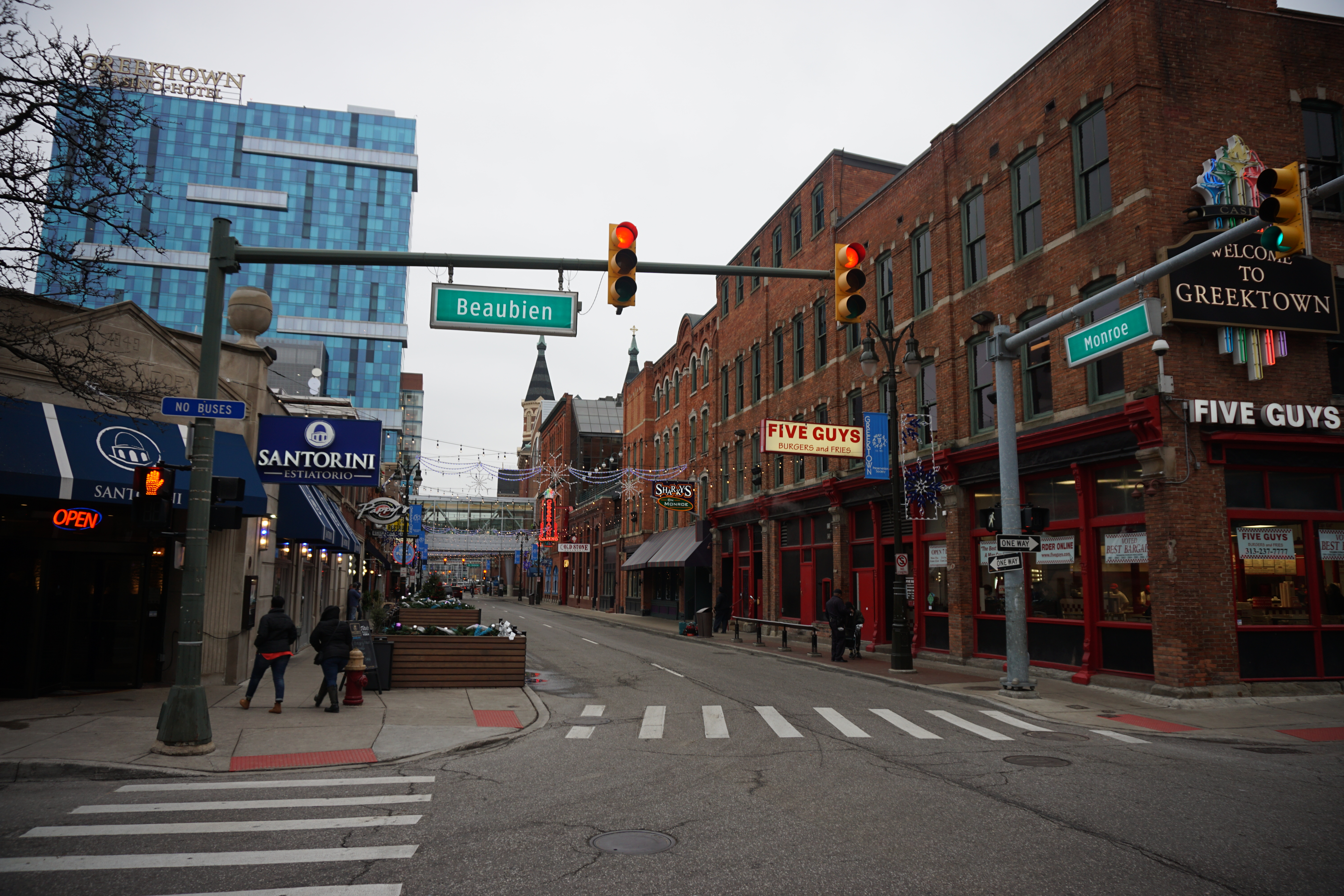
Monroe Street in Greektown

Changes continue, and as of June 2012 only three full-fledged Greek restaurants remain in Greektown. The neighborhood is a popular restaurant and entertainment district, having many restaurants that serve authentic Greek cuisine, and one of the city's three casinos, Hollywood Casino at Greektown. Certain buildings on Monroe Street feature themes related to the mythical Pegasus, and such historic Greek structures as the Parthenon, and other ancient architecture. Greek music is played on Monroe Street throughout the day. Well-known restaurants include The Golden Fleece, Bakaliko Cafe, Pegasus Taverna, and Fishbone's Rhythm Kitchen Cafe. The Detroit People Mover has a station at the Hollywood Casino on Beaubien Street between Monroe Street and Lafayette Boulevard.

== See also ==
- History of the Greek Americans in Metro Detroit
- Greektown station
