= University of Michigan School of Social Work =

Coordinates: 42.2747°N 83.736°W

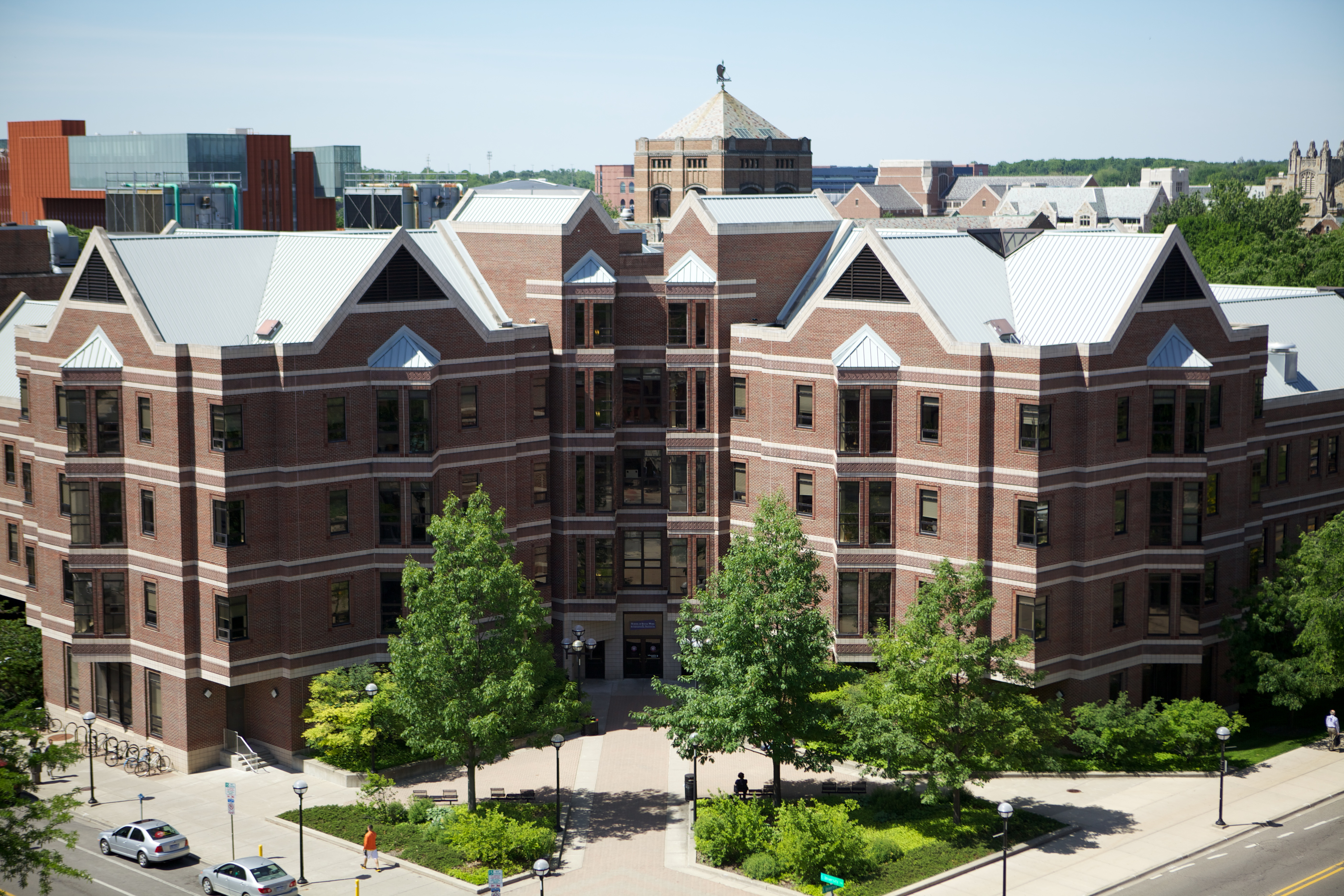
- University of Michigan School of Social Work Building
- Former names: Institute of Public and Social Administration (1936–1946); Institute of Social Work (1946–1951)
- Type: Public
- Established: 1936; 90 years ago
- Parent institution: University of Michigan
- Dean: Beth Angell
- Postgraduates: 642 (FA 2015)
- Location: Ann Arbor, Michigan, United States
- Colors: Maize & Blue
- Website: ssw.umich.edu
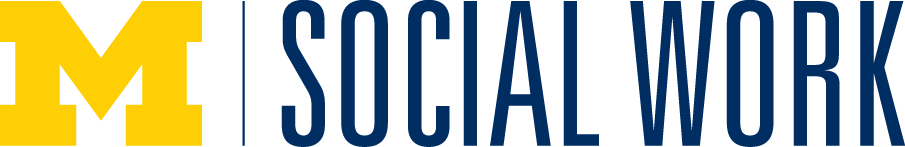

The University of Michigan School of Social Work is a professional school within the University of Michigan located in Ann Arbor, Michigan.

== History ==
A formal curriculum in social work was first offered by the University of Michigan College of Literature, Science, and the Arts, in 1921. In 1936, the first Master of Social Work (MSW) degree was offered by the Institute of Public and Social Administration, which later became the Institute of Social Work in 1946. From 1936 to 1951, a total of 348 MSW degrees were granted.

In 1951, the School of Social Work was established to offer a professional educational program on the graduate level leading to advanced degrees, and the program moved from Detroit to Ann Arbor, with Fedele F. Fauri acting as dean until 1970. The school was first located in a small house on Washington and Thayer, before moving into the Frieze Building, where it remained until 1998, when the school moved to a new dedicated building on the corner of South and East University.

During the School of Social Work's first year, 91 full-time and 96 part-time students were enrolled. Today the school averages around 650 enrolled MSW students and 80 enrolled doctoral students. In 1957, the Joint Doctoral Program in Social Work and Social Science was created.

=== Research and Training Center ===
The Vivian A. and James L. Curtis School of Social Work Research and Training Center serves as a research incubator, evaluation training, and research support services center at the University of Michigan School of Social Work.

The Curtis Center offers research consultation, educational programming and training, and program evaluation training and services for students, postdocs, and outside organizations.

== Rankings and reputation ==
In the past 15 years, the school has ranked either the #1 or #2 school of social work by U.S. News & World Report and ranked in the top three schools of social work for the past 30 years.

== Notable alumni ==
- Bogart Leashore, dean of Hunter College school of social work (1991-2003)

== See also ==
List of social work schools
