= Coleman Young =

American politician (1918–1997)

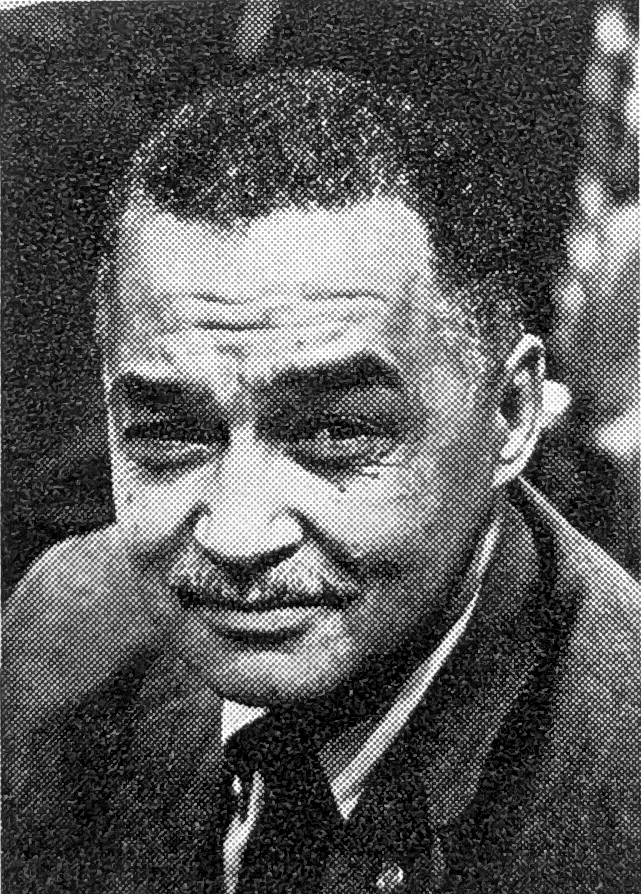
- Young circa 1972

66th Mayor of Detroit
- In office January 1, 1974 – January 3, 1994
- Preceded by: Roman Gribbs
- Succeeded by: Dennis Archer

40th President of the United States Conference of Mayors
- In office 1982–1983
- Preceded by: Helen Boosalis
- Succeeded by: Richard Fulton

Member of the Michigan Senate from the 4th district
- In office January 1, 1965 – 1973
- Preceded by: Charles S. Blondy
- Succeeded by: David S. Holmes, Jr.

Personal details
- Born: Coleman Alexander Young; May 24, 1918 Tuscaloosa, Alabama, U.S.
- Died: November 29, 1997 (aged 79) Detroit, Michigan, U.S.
- Resting place: Elmwood Cemetery, Detroit, Michigan, U.S.
- Party: Democratic
- Spouses: Marion McClellan (m. 1947; div. 1954) Nadine Baxter (m. 1955; div. 1960)
- Children: Coleman Young II
- Profession: Politician

Military service
- Branch/service: United States Army; Army Air Forces
- Years of service: 1942–1946
- Rank: Second Lieutenant
- Unit: 477th Bombardment Group
- Battles/wars: World War II

Coleman Alexander Young (May 24, 1918 – November 29, 1997) was an American politician who served as the 66th mayor of Detroit, Michigan from 1974 until 1994. A member of the Democratic Party, Young was the first African-American mayor of Detroit, and has been described as the "single most influential person in Detroit's modern history."

Young had emerged from the far-left element in Detroit, but became an advocate for business interests after his election as mayor. He called an ideological truce and gained widespread support from the city's business leaders. The new mayor energetically promoted downtown redevelopment with major projects like the Joe Louis Arena and the Renaissance Center. Facing intense manufacturing flight, Young worked to keep major plants in the city, most notably General Motors' Poletown project and Chrysler's Jefferson North assembly. Some opponents said that he pulled money out of the neighborhoods to rehabilitate the downtown business district, but he said "there were no other options."

In 1981, Young received the Spingarn Medal for achievement from the NAACP.

== Early life and education ==
Young was born in Tuscaloosa, Alabama, to William Coleman Young, a dry cleaner, and Ida Reese Jones. His family moved in 1923 to Detroit, as part of the Great Migration out of the South to industrial cities that offered more opportunity. His family later converted to Catholicism, though Young was denied entry to a Catholic high school due to his race. Young graduated from Eastern High School in 1935. He became a member of the United Auto Workers, and worked for Ford Motor Company. Later Young worked for the United States Post Office Department.

During World War II, Young served in the 477th Medium-Bomber Group (the renowned Tuskegee Airmen) of the United States Army Air Forces as a second lieutenant, bombardier, and navigator. As a lieutenant in the 477th, Young played a role in the Freeman Field Mutiny in 1945. Some 162 African-American officers were arrested for resisting segregation at a base near Seymour, Indiana.

In the 1940s, Young was labelled a fellow traveler of the Communist Party by belonging to groups whose members also belonged to the Party, and was accused of being a former member. Young's involvement in worker-oriented organizations, including the Progressive Party, the United Auto Workers and the National Negro Labor Council, made him a target of anti-Communist investigators, including the FBI and HUAC. He protested segregation in the Army and racial discrimination in the UAW. In 1948, Young supported Progressive Party presidential candidate Henry A. Wallace.

In 1952, Young stunned observers when he appeared before the McCarthy era House Committee on Un-American Activities (HUAC) and defied the congressmen. He made sarcastic retorts and repeatedly cited the Fifth Amendment, refusing to answer whether or not he was a member of the Communist Party. The encounter came at a highly publicized formal hearing in Detroit. Young's performance made him a hero in Detroit's growing black community. To a committee member's statement that he seemed reluctant to fight communism, Young said:

"I am not here to fight in any un-American activities, because I consider the denial of the right to vote to large numbers of people all over the South un-American." To the HUAC congressman from Georgia, he said: "I happen to know, in Georgia, Negro people are prevented from voting by virtue of terror, intimidation and lynchings. It is my contention you would not be in Congress today if it were not for the legal restrictions on voting on the part of my people."

He said to another HUAC congressman:

"Congressman, neither me or none of my friends were at this plant the other day brandishing a rope in the face of John Cherveny, a young union organizer and factory worker who was threatened with repeated violence after members of the HUAC alleged that he might be a communist, I can assure you I have had no part in the hanging or bombing of Negroes in the South. I have not been responsible for firing a person from his job for what I think are his beliefs, or what somebody thinks he believes in, and things of that sort. That is the hysteria that has been swept up by this committee."

According to historians Harvey Klehr, John Earl Haynes and Ronald Radosh, Coleman Young was "a secret CPUSA [Communist Party USA] member."

== Political career ==
Young built his political base in Detroit on the East Side in the 1940s and 1950s, which had become a center of the African-American community. In 1960, he was elected as a delegate to help draft a new state constitution for Michigan.

In 1964, Young won election to the Michigan State Senate. His most significant legislation was a law requiring arbitration in disputes between public-sector unions and municipalities. During his senate career, he also pointed out inequities in Michigan state funding, "spending $20 million on rural bus service and a fat zero for the same thing in Detroit."

== Mayoralty ==
=== 1973 campaign ===
Coleman Young decided to run for mayor of Detroit in 1973. At the forefront of his campaign, he sought to address the increasing police violence suffered by black residents in the city. By 1972, the black population in Detroit was nearly half of the population – but was patrolled disproportionately by a white police department. Specifically, Young notified Police Commissioner John Nichols that the police decoy unit, STRESS (Stop the Robberies and Enjoy Safe Streets), was a major racially charged problem of the city. Officers deployed under STRESS had been accused of killing 22 people and arresting hundreds without cause during its 2 1/2 years of operation. In his campaign, Young quoted "one of the problems is that the police run the city… STRESS is responsible for the explosive polarization that now exists; STRESS is an execution squad rather than an enforcement squad. As mayor, I will get rid of STRESS". The police responded by endorsing John Nichols, the Police Commissioner who was running for mayor against Coleman Young.

Throughout the campaign, Young had an edge over Nichols due to both a growing black population base and due to his broad political experience in local, state, and national politics. In opposition, Nichols took advantage of the white fear of black crime in the street in order to advance his campaign. Nichols represented a national trend of increased police power and brutality in post-riot cities, and therefore, in Young's opinion, had to be defeated. While neither candidate openly spoke about race, after the fact, Young admitted that in 1973, “the race was about race”. Both mayoral candidates were conscious of the high racial tensions in the city, but both attempted to appeal to all groups.

In November 1973, Young narrowly defeated Nichols for mayor, becoming the first black mayor of Detroit. His election represented a major turning point in both the city's racial and political history. In his inaugural address, Mayor Young stated that “the first problem that we must face as citizens of this great city, the first fact that we must look squarely in the eye, is that this city has too long been polarized”. He stated that "we can no longer afford the luxury of hatred and racial division. What is good for the black people of this city is good for the white people of this city. What is good for the rich people of this city is good for the poor people of this city. What is good for those who live in the suburbs is good for those of us who live in the central city". Winning by such a small margin in a racially polarized city, Young knew the burden he would have to shoulder as mayor.

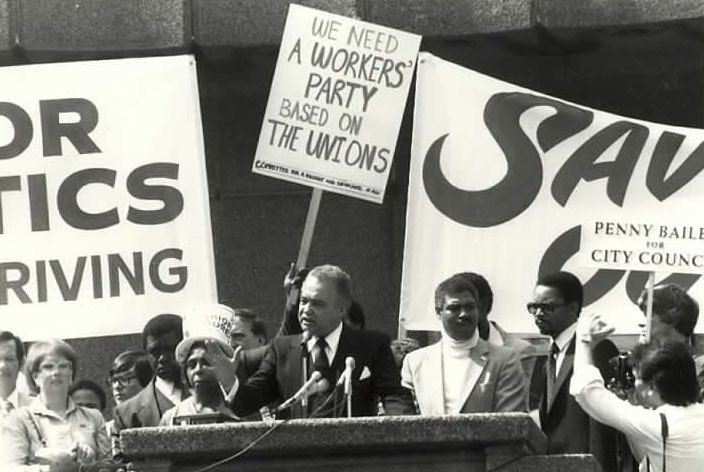
Young, 1981

Young served five terms as mayor of Detroit from 1974 to 1994. Young won re-election by wide margins in 1977, 1981, 1985 and 1989, to serve a total of 20 years as mayor, based largely on black votes.

=== First mayoral term: 1974–1978 ===
As mayor during his first term, Young promptly disbanded the STRESS unit, began efforts to integrate the police department and increased patrols in high crime neighborhoods utilizing a community policing approach. Young's effect on integrating the Detroit Police Department was successful; the proportion of blacks rose to more than 50 percent in 1993 from less than 10 percent in 1974 and has remained at about that level. Both actions were credited with reducing the number of brutality complaints against the city's police to 825 in 1982 from 2,323 in 1975.

When asked in an interview about the high and low points of his first term, Young responded that avoiding the near riot he faced after the shooting of a black teenager was a high. He stated that "we found a police department, which had been guilty of excesses in the past, being professional and, even under provocation, not firing a single shot. We also found leaders, black and white who had the courage to get out there in front of angry citizens and help keep the peace". In contrast, his biggest challenge was that Detroit had been in a depression for the two and a half years he had been in office. He stated that “most of [his] time has been spent putting out fires instead of going ahead with plans for the city”, something he hoped to address in his second term.

=== Second mayoral term: 1978–1982 ===
In 1978, Mayor Young won his second term as mayor and planned to execute many campaign promises unfulfilled from his first term. At the forefront of his agenda, Young wanted to ensure affirmative action initiatives in order to positively transform the racial makeup of city departments, particularly the police department. Young addressed the issue of Affirmative Action head on, and welcomed the NAACP to Detroit with the words, "welcome to Detroit, the Affirmative Action City – I can’t think of any recent issue that is more important to the future of minorities and women and the whole American people than the issue of affirmative action" (Young, 1978).

His efforts for affirmative action were stalled in 1981, when a budget crisis forced Detroit voters to approve an income tax hike and city officials to sell $125 million in emergency bonds. Young had to convince Detroit voters to trust his plans to save the city from bankruptcy, and he had to convince state legislature and municipal workers to accept a two-year wage freeze. In addition, Black unemployment in the city remained at 25 percent – all issues that Young attempted to tackle during his third term.

=== Third mayoral term: 1982–1986 ===
Young's third term as mayor focused heavily on both the covert and overt forces of racism that divided the city and suburbs. Being mayor of a predominantly black city surrounded by predominantly white suburbs meant that Young dealt with an inescapable rift between the two. In 1984, Young stated that racism was "at an all time high" (Young, 1984). Young understood the need for suburban-city cooperation as essential for regional growth; the two needed to work with each other. Young attempted to resolve this division by attracting more jobs in the city for a stronger partnership.

From 1982 until 1983, Young served as president of the United States Conference of Mayors.

=== Fourth mayoral term: 1986–1990 ===
Young's Press Conference with Mickey Mouse (1988)
Young giving a press conference in 1988.

During his fourth term, Young continued to work on improving racial relations of the city and neighborhood standards. He worked on many successful projects to build more than 1,800 apartment units in the city, with “50 percent black and 50 percent white, half from within Detroit and half from outside”. He sought for these projects to promote economic and racial integration in the city.

=== Fifth mayoral term: 1990–1994 ===
During Mayor Young's fifth and final term, the Detroit community had sharply divided opinions about his response to the death of a young Black man Malice Green after a beating by two white police officers. Green's death on November 5, 1992, occurred only months after the Los Angeles riots of 1992, which protested the acquittal of police officers in the videotaped beating of Rodney King.

At the time, a writer for the Detroit News and Free Press said, "the foundation upon which Mayor Coleman Young built his career and his administration was rocked Thursday by the beating death of a Detroit man at the hands of Detroit police officers."

=== Legacy ===
Integrating the police department was one of Young's greatest accomplishments in improving race relations in the city. He also presided over two fiscal crises.

Throughout his time as mayor, Young was an outspoken advocate for large Detroit construction projects, and his administration saw the completion of the Renaissance Center, Detroit People Mover, the General Motors Detroit/Hamtramck Assembly Plant, the Detroit Receiving Hospital, the Chrysler Jefferson North Assembly Plant, the Riverfront Condominiums, the Millender Center Apartments, the Harbortown retail and residential complex, 150 West Jefferson, One Detroit Center and the Fox Theater restoration, among other developments.

Detroit experienced a severe population drop during Young's mayoralty, suffering a loss of 500,000 residents. Young attributed this 40 percent drop in population to the deterioration of neighborhoods which he promptly worked to overcome. Instead of agonizing over the issue, Young came up with ways to correct some of the imbalances between land and people. Young's administration sought to redevelop many neighborhoods throughout Detroit in order to revitalize the city's landscape. These construction projects often led to opposition among neighborhood activists. This opposition typically manifested itself in rigorous budget debate, rather than in serious electoral challenges against Young. Most of the time Young prevailed over this opposition, seeking jobs and economic stimulus as a way to help rebuild Detroit's neighborhoods.

== Personal life ==
Young was twice married and divorced, and had a twelve-year relationship with Joyce Finley Garrett from 1968 to 1980. He fathered a son with executive assistant director of public works Annivory Calvert and initially denied paternity until DNA tests proved that he was the child's biological father. He served as a state senator in Michigan's 1st Senate district and was previously a state representative in Michigan's 4th District, the same district where Young lived as mayor and served as state senator.

Young was a Prince Hall Freemason.

== Death ==
On November 29, 1997, Young died from emphysema. Upon learning of Young's death, former President Jimmy Carter called Young "one of the greatest mayors our country has known."

Republican Michigan Gov. John Engler called the former Democratic mayor "a man of his word who was willing to work with anyone, regardless of party or politics, to help Detroit – the city he loved and fought for all his life."

In December 1997, Young would be the first to lie in state at the Charles H. Wright Museum of African American History.

== Assessment ==
=== Corruption ===
Six federal investigations of his administration resulted in trials and convictions for some of his associates, including Detroit Police Chief and Deputy Chief, William L. Hart and Kenneth Weiner, but none for Young.

In 2000, a FOIA investigation showed that Young was under FBI surveillance beginning in the 1940s (because of his suspected link to communists) and continuing through the 1980s. The Detroit FBI office turned over 935 of its 1,357 pages of material, which included business records and wiretap transcripts.

In 2018, Detroit Free Press columnist Bill McGraw said claims Young was corrupt were a "myth":

The FBI investigated Young for decades. They confronted him in random places; asked about his politics; wiretapped his condo; wired a convicted con man who was his business associate and scrutinized the mayor’s finances. But while relatives and people around Young went to prison for corruption, Young never was indicted or charged with a crime.

=== Crime ===
Though there were no civil disturbances as serious as the race riots of 1863, 1943, and 1967 during Young's terms as mayor, he has been blamed for failing to stem crime in the city. Several violent gangs controlled the region's drug trade in the 1970s and 1980s. Major criminal gangs that were founded in Detroit and dominated the drug trade at various times included The Errol Flynns (east side), Nasty Flynns (later the NF Bangers) and Black Killers and the drug consortiums of the 1980s such as Young Boys Inc., Pony Down, Best Friends, Black Mafia Family and the Chambers Brothers.

From 1965 onward, Detroit had experienced an upwards trajectory of its homicide rate. In 1974, the year Young took office, the homicide rate in Detroit was slightly above 50 per 100,000 residents. Over the rest of the 1970s, Detroit's homicide rate trended downward, dropping below 40 homicides per 100,000 in 1977 and 1979. However, in the 1980s the homicide rate significantly increased, reaching a peak of 63.5 in 1987. In 1994, the year Young retired from office, the homicide rate was roughly 54 per 100,000.

=== Economic conditions ===
Young's administration coincided with some periods of broad social and economic challenges in the United States, including economic recession, oil shock, the decline of the U.S. automotive industry and a loss of manufacturing sector jobs in the Midwest to other parts of the U.S. and the world. White flight to the Detroit suburbs, which had begun in the 1950s and accelerated after the 1967 race riot, persisted during Young's two decades in office, amid ongoing crime and drug problems in the inner city. Supporters of Young attributed the flight to factors such as white resistance to court ordered desegregation, deteriorating housing stock, aging industrial plants and a declining automotive industry leading to a loss of economic opportunities inside the city. Over the course of his time as mayor, Detroit lost about one-third of its population.

Economic conditions in Detroit generally trended sideways or downward over the period of Young's political tenure, with the unemployment rate trending from approximately 9% in 1971 to approximately 11% in 1993, when Young retired. However, most economic metrics (unemployment, median income rates, and city gross domestic product) initially dropped sharply during economic recessions, reaching their lowest points in the 1980s and early 1990s, with the unemployment rate in particular peaking at approximately 20% in 1982.

Young himself explained the impact of the riots in his autobiography:

The heaviest casualty, however, was the city. Detroit's losses went a hell of a lot deeper than the immediate toll of lives and buildings. The riot put Detroit on the fast track to economic desolation, mugging the city and making off with incalculable value in jobs, earnings taxes, corporate taxes, retail dollars, sales taxes, mortgages, interest, property taxes, development dollars, investment dollars, tourism dollars, and plain damn money. The money was carried out in the pockets of the businesses and the white people who fled as fast as they could. The white exodus from Detroit had been prodigiously steady prior to the riot, totalling twenty-two thousand in 1966, but afterwards it was frantic. In 1967, with less than half the year remaining after the summer explosion – the outward population migration reached sixty-seven thousand. In 1968 the figure hit eighty-thousand, followed by forty-six thousand in 1969.

=== Police department ===
Young himself expressed his belief that reform of the police department stood as one of his greatest accomplishments. He implemented broad affirmative action programs that lead to racial integration, and created a network of Neighborhood City Halls and Police Mini Stations. Young used the relationship established by community policing to mobilize large civilian patrols to address the incidents of Devil's Night arson that had come to plague the city each year. These patrols have been continued by succeeding administrations and have mobilized as many as 30,000 citizens in a single year in an effort to forestall seasonal arson.

=== Overall ===
A 1993 survey of historians, political scientists and urban experts conducted by Melvin G. Holli of the University of Illinois at Chicago ranked Young as the twelfth-worst American big-city mayor to have served between the years 1820 and 1993.

== Legacy ==
- Young is interred at Elmwood Cemetery in Detroit.
- The City-County Building which houses City of Detroit and Wayne County offices was renamed the Coleman A. Young Municipal Building in 1999.
- Young put together the financing package for the Charles H. Wright Museum of African American History. He has a wing named after him there.
- Detroit City Airport, a general aviation facility serving Detroit, was renamed Coleman A. Young International Airport in 2003.
- In 1979, Young received the U.S. Senator John Heinz Award for Greatest Public Service by an Elected or Appointed Official, an award given out annually by Jefferson Awards.
- In 1982, Young received the Congressional Black Caucus Foundation's Adam Clayton Powell Award
- On December 6, 2022, the Michigan Legislature adopted a resolution to replace the Lewis Cass statue in the National Statuary Hall Collection with a statue of Young.

== See also ==
- List of first African-American mayors

== See also ==
- Executive Order 9981
- List of mayors of Detroit
- List of Tuskegee Airmen
- Military history of African Americans
- Tuskegee Airmen

Political offices
Preceded by Roman Gribbs	Mayor of Detroit; 1974–1994	Succeeded by Dennis Archer
