= Eduardo Xol =

American actor, singer and designer (1966–2024)

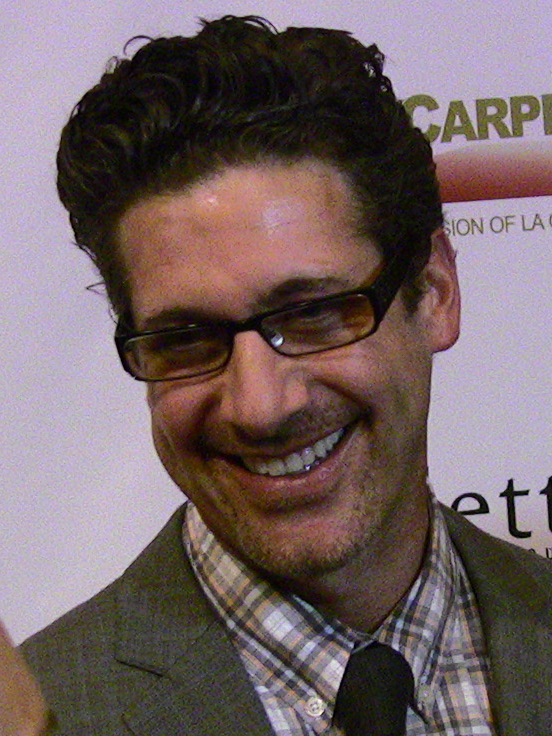
- Edwardo Xol in 2011
- Born: Eduardo Torres Xol; February 19, 1966; Los Angeles, California, U.S.
- Died: September 20, 2024 (aged 58); Palm Springs, California, U.S.
- Cause of death: Murder
- Occupations: Television personality; designer; entertainer; social activist; businessman
- Years active: 1994–2024

Eduardo Torres Xol (pronounced "soul"; February 19, 1966 – September 20, 2024) was an American television personality, designer, entertainer, social activist and businessman. He was most known to U.S. television audiences for his work as a designer on Extreme Makeover: Home Edition which formerly aired on ABC.

== Early life and education ==
Eduardo Torres Xol was born in Los Angeles on February 19, 1966. He was the oldest son of Eduardo and Mirna Torres. Xol grew up in Montebello, California. His younger siblings are Mónica Cajayon and Ernesto Torres.

Eduardo attended Potrero Heights Elementary School, Macy Intermediate School and Schurr High School graduating in 1984.

Xol was one of the youngest musicians to be scouted and selected to perform with the Los Angeles Philharmonic Orchestra at the age of ten. By age 13, at the request of the National Conservatory of Music of Mexico, he also traveled on an exchange program to give a series of piano recitals.

During his teens, Xol joined the Brand New Theatre to perform at The Palm Beach Club in Cannes, France. It was during this time that Xol made his feature film debut in Zoot Suit with Edward James Olmos while dancing with the Mexican Dance Theatre of Los Angeles. He enrolled in the University of California, Los Angeles theatre program. While there, Xol directed and produced several musical theatre comedy revues, which toured throughout the United States.

== Early career ==
Xol headed south to Latin America, where he worked in music and television in Mexico under the stage name of "Edi Xol". He starred in several worldwide-syndicated telenovelas including Acapulco, cuerpo y alma, Sentimientos Ajenos and La Jaula de Oro while producing music and videos.

His production company partnered with BMG U.S. Latin to produce his first solo album, La Pasión, and the first single "Somos" ("We Are") was nominated for a Lo Nuestro Award for Video of the Year. He represented the United States at the International Music Festival at Viña Del Mar, Chile. Soon, Elle, Harper's Bazaar and Somos magazines featured Xol as one of Latin America's most eligible and gorgeous bachelors.

In 1998, Xol moved back to the United States as he transferred his experience in musical composition and entertainment production into the world of lifestyle and design. He began spending time with his father as he learned the art of caring for bonsai trees. It was this work with plants that solidified his design aesthetic and life philosophy.

== Television ==
Xol joined the cast of ABC's internationally syndicated TV show Extreme Makeover: Home Edition as a co-star during Season 2. Series reruns began airing on TV Land on Tuesday August 7, 2007. The show is also in syndication on CMT.

== Partnerships ==
In addition to Xol's monthly column that he authored in People en Español and AOL Latino, he has been featured and produced segments for Good Morning America, and was named among the "100 Most Influential Hispanics in America" by Hispanic Business Magazine.

In 2010, Hayneedle announced the launch of the Hayneedle.com Backyard Summer, a multimillion-dollar, integrated marketing campaign aimed at bringing variety to America's homes with Xol as its celebrity designer for outdoor design, outdoor living and landscaping. As part of the relationship, Xol executive produced and starred in a webisode series, Hayneedle Your Home. The relationship continued throughout the fall with a new campaign, "Countdown to Company", in which Xol gave decorating and entertaining tips to prepare for guests during the holidays.

Xol has become a voice in both the Hispanic and English language markets, having partnered with companies such as the Ford Motor Company, Sears, Waterford Crystal, The Occasion Group/Taylor Corporation and DirecTV.

== Books ==
HarperCollins published Xol's first book in spring 2007 titled Home Sense, which was awarded the Best Self-Help Book at the 2008 International Latino Book Awards. His second book, Extreme Entertaining Made Simple, was published by the Penguin Group in fall 2008, and focused on entertaining for the senses. It includes a CD of originally composed and licensed music.

== Charity work ==
Eduardo Xol was a co-founder of the ALUMI Media Group, a non-profit organization that brings alternative learning through media arts to students in underserved communities in the Los Angeles area.

Xol worked with the Lupus Foundation of America to increase public awareness as part of the Band Together for Lupus Campaign. Xol's sister Monica has been living with lupus for the past ten years. He created a garden oasis for his sister as part of his web-series for Hayneedle.

Xol was a supporter of the Gay & Lesbian Alliance Against Defamation (GLAAD) and shot public service announcements as a part of the "Be an Ally & a Friend" public education campaign in both English and Spanish (with actresses Sofía Vergara and Zoe Saldaña). Xol also recorded a public service announcement for the Michigan Humane Society and worked in conjunction with The Trevor Project, Starkey Hearing Foundation, and the Make-A-Wish Foundation.

== Death ==
Xol died at the Desert Regional Medical Center in Palm Springs, California, on September 20, 2024, at the age of 58. He had been stabbed at his apartment the week prior and was reportedly discovered by Palm Springs Police Department with serious injuries. A 34-year-old man from Cathedral City, California, was arrested and charged with attempted murder. Following Xol's death, the charges have been upgraded to murder.
