= Palmer Park =

Palmer Park may refer to:

- Palmer Park (Chicago), a public park in the city of Chicago, Illinois, United States
- Palmer Park, Colorado Springs, a public park in the city of Colorado Springs, Colorado, United States
- Palmer Park (Detroit), a public park in the city of Detroit, Michigan, United States
- Palmer Park, Maryland, an unincorporated community within the Greater Landover area of Maryland, United States
- Palmer Park, Reading, a public park in the town of Reading, England, United Kingdom

== See also ==
- Palmer Park Apartment Building Historic District, in the city of Detroit, Michigan, United States
