= Lizzie Merrill Palmer =

American philanthropist and suffragist

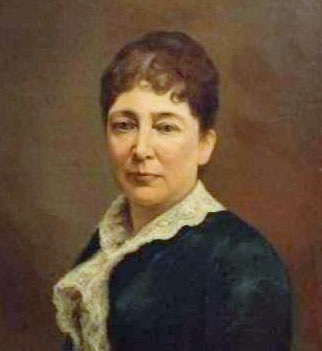
- Portrait of Lizzie Pitts Merrill Palmer c. 1884
- Born: Elizabeth Pitts Merrill; October 8, 1838; Portland, Maine
- Died: July 28, 1916 (aged 77); Great Neck, Long Island, New York
- Occupation: philanthropist
- Known for: founded the Merrill-Palmer Institute
- Spouse: Thomas W. Palmer (m. 1855; died in 1913)

Elizabeth Pitts Palmer (née Merrill; October 8, 1838 – July 28, 1916), known as Lizzie Merrill Palmer or Lizzie Palmer, was an American philanthropist whose bequest founded the Merrill-Palmer Institute in Detroit. She was also a founder of the Michigan Humane Society, active in the women's suffrage movement, and a benefactor of the Detroit Institute of Arts.

== Life ==
Elizabeth Pitts Merrill, known as "Lizzie", was born October 8, 1838, in Portland, Maine. She was the only child of Charles Merrill, a lumber owner and Frances (Pitts) Merrill.

In 1855, she married Thomas W. Palmer with whom she adopted two children. and the couple settled outside what were then the boundaries of Detroit (but within its current boundaries). Thomas W. Palmer was a U.S. Senator from 1883 to 1889 and U.S. Minister to Spain in 1889–1890.

Palmer and her husband supported the Detroit Institute of Art (which now stands on the former site of their home), the Michigan branch of the Society for the Prevention of Cruelty to Animals, the University of Michigan, and the YMCA.

In 1893, the Palmers donated land to Detroit that became Palmer Park. After her husband's death in 1913 Palmer devoted herself to founding, endowing and maintaining a school to be known as the Merrill-Palmer Motherhood and Home Training School. The School was established in 1920 as the Freer House to serve Detroit's children through formal academic programs in infant, toddler, child and adolescent development, and in family functioning.

Palmer died on July 28, 1916, aged 77, in Great Neck, Long Island, New York.

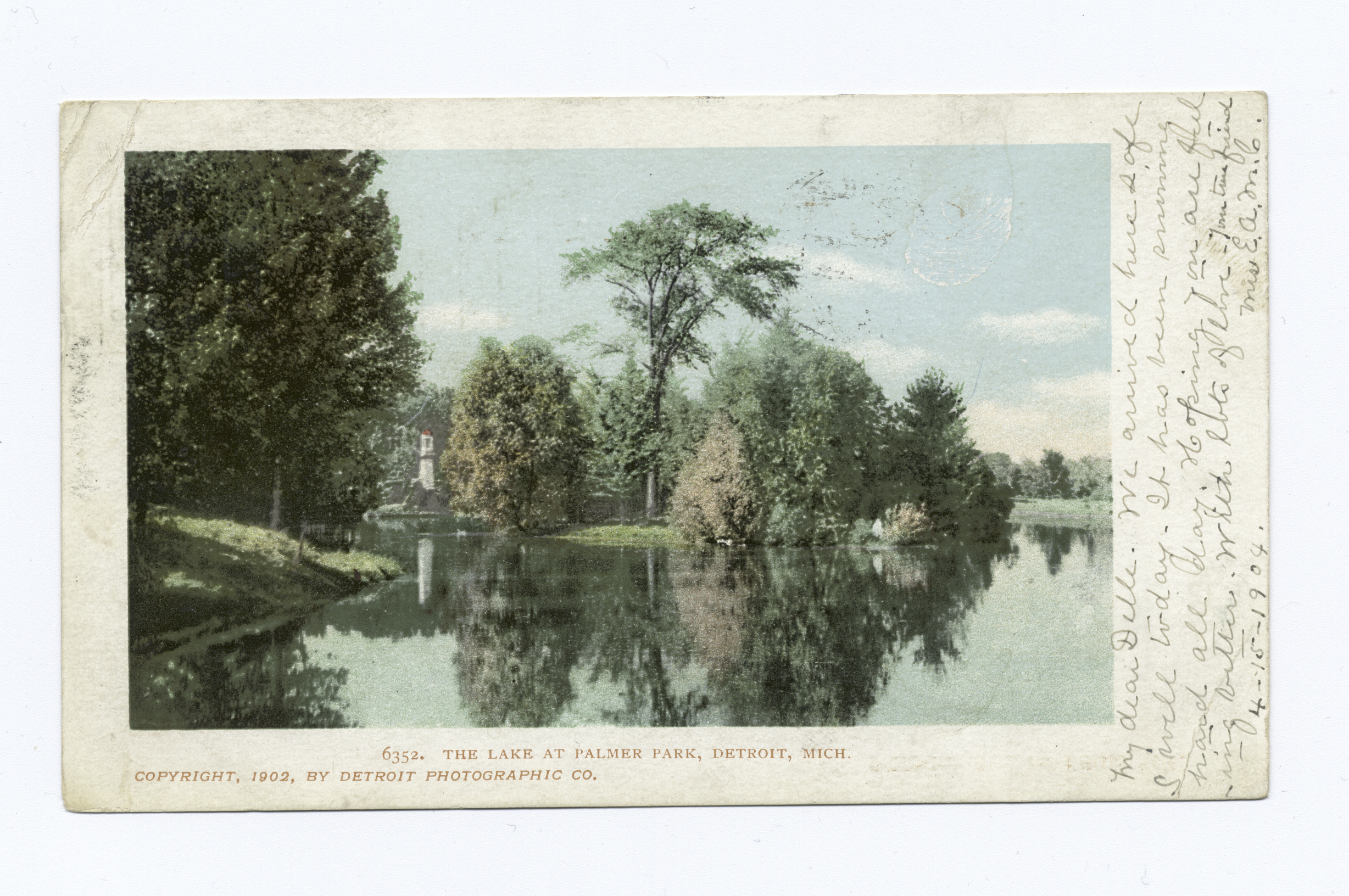
Lake at Palmer Park

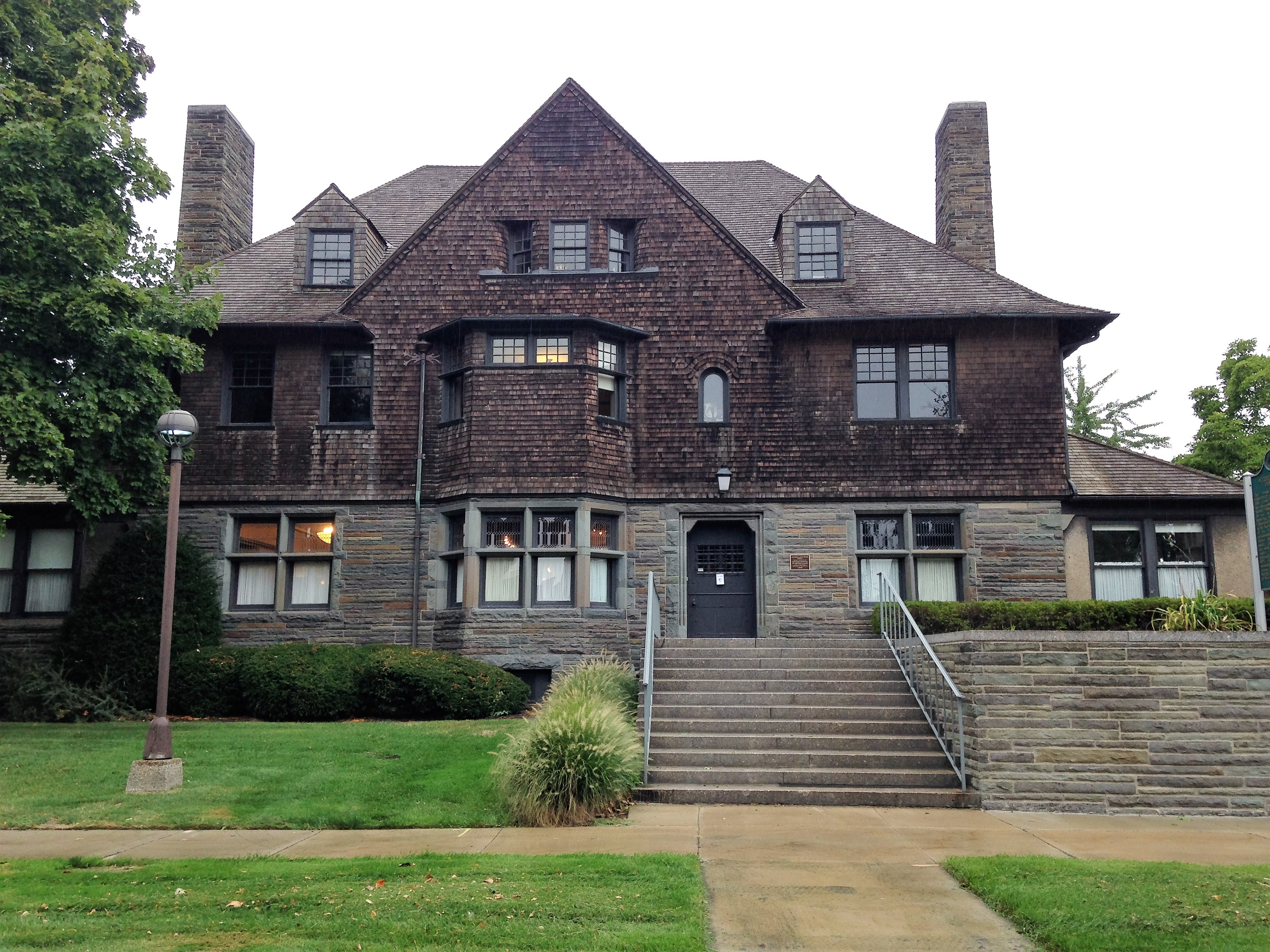
Merrill-Palmer Skillman Institute

== Legacy ==
In 1980, the Freer House School was incorporated into Wayne State University. It is now known as the Merrill-Palmer Skillman Institute.
