= Palmer Park Boulevard Apartments District =

Historic district in Michigan, United States

- U.S. National Register of Historic Places
- U.S. Historic district
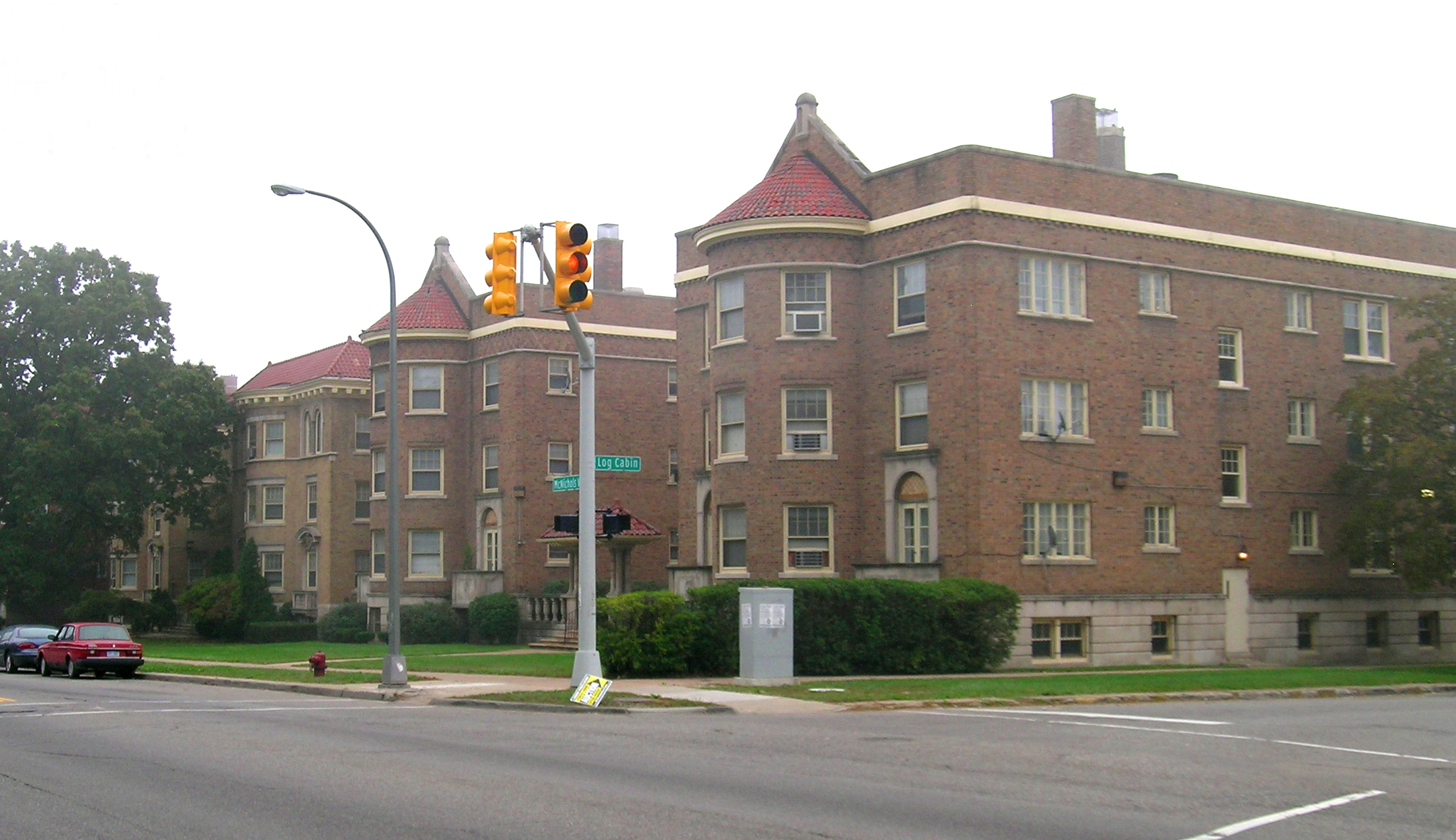

- Location within Michigan Location within the United States
- Interactive map
- Location: 1981, 2003 and 2025 West McNichols Road, Highland Park, Michigan
- Coordinates: 42°25′2″N 83°7′15″W
- Architect: Richard H. Marr
- Architectural style: Late 19th And 20th Century Revivals, Classical Revival
- NRHP reference No.: 91001983
- Added to NRHP: January 22, 1992

The Palmer Park Boulevard Apartments District is a collection of three apartment buildings located in Highland Park, Michigan. The district was listed on the National Register of Historic Places in 1992.

== History ==
In the early 1920s, the architect Richard H. Marr entered into a partnership with businessman R.B. Oberteuffer (under the name The Fairway Company) to design and build an upscale apartment building at the corner of what was then known as Palmer Park Boulevard and Twelfth Street (now McNichols and Rosa Parks). The development was in response to the growth of the area due to the nearness of both Palmer Park and the Detroit Golf Club. Marr and Oberteuffer built the Fairway in 1923. Soon after, the Young Construction Company hired Marr to design four more apartment buildings along Palmer Park Boulevard: The Southcourse, built in 1924, and the Douglas, Northcourse, and Georgian Apartments, all constructed in 1925. When finished, the five apartment buildings formed a symmetric grouping, with the end buildings essentially alike in design.

The first occupants of the apartments tended to be professionals, small business owners, and executives of larger firms. Because of the location, these buildings became some of the most exclusive addresses in Highland Park. However, the two easternmost buildings, the Fairway and the Douglas, suffered severe fire damage and were demolished in the 1990s.

== Description ==
The three remaining apartment buildings sit adjacent to each other, and in addition to the architectural similarity, all share a uniform height, setback, and general plan.

=== Georgian Apartments ===
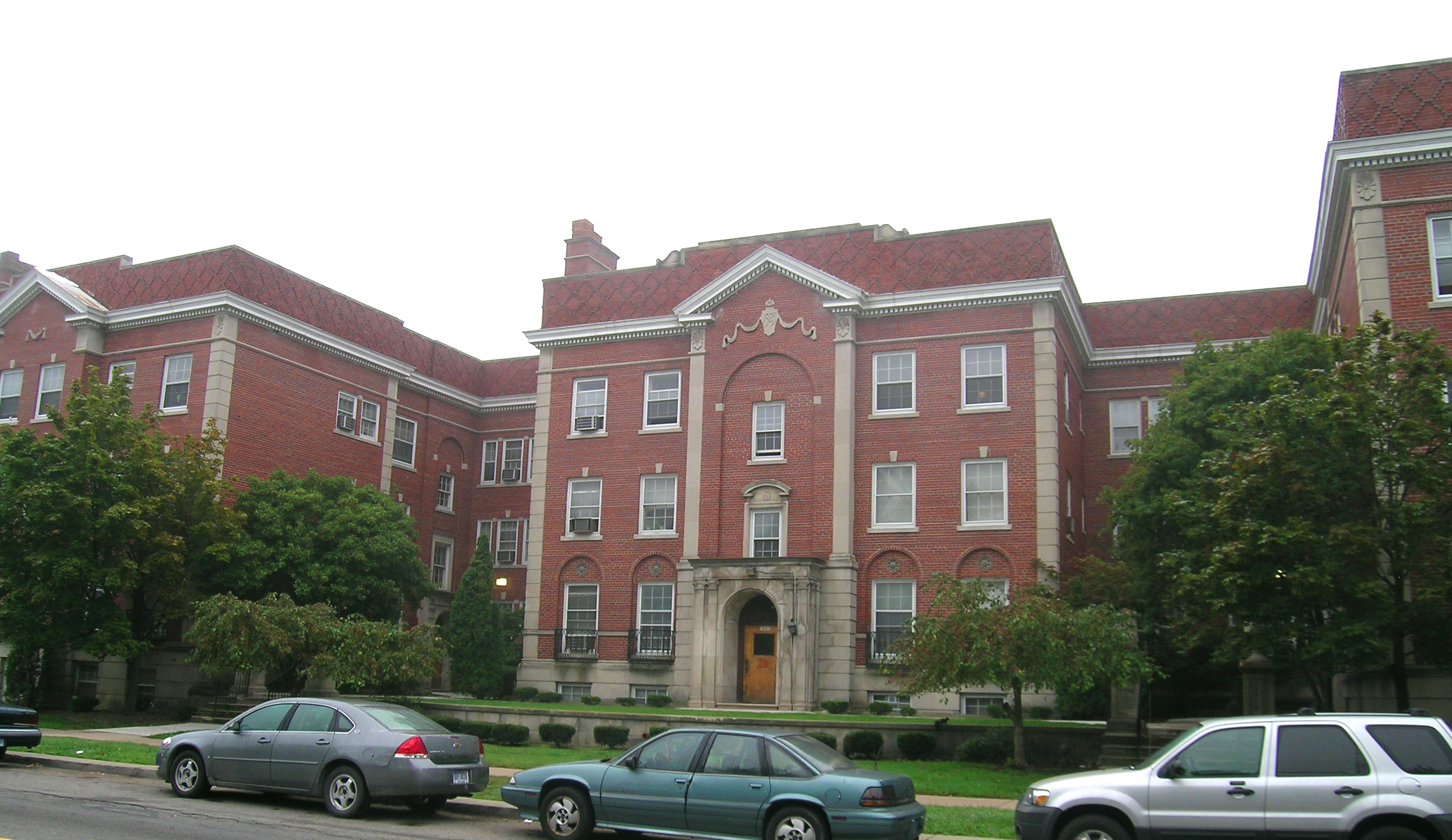
Georgian Apartments

The Georgian Apartments, located at 1981 W. McNichols, was once the center building in the five-building array of apartments. It is a symmetrical, three-story E-plan Georgian Revival structure, and is both larger and differently shaped than the other four original apartment buildings. The building is faced with red brick with limestone trim, and the entire building is topped with a dentil cornice. A retaining wall in the front of the building connects the top and bottom arms of the E, and forms a raised entrance courtyard. Three entrances lead off this court: one in the center leg of the E and one on the inside of each arm.

The front facades of each arm consist of three bays, the central one slightly projecting and crowned with a pediment. Windows on the first floor are inset into arches; those on the upper floors have flat tops. The central arm facade holds the most prominent entrance, with rusticated stone on the first floor and a stone pavilion with a deeply recessed doorway.

When built, the Georgian offered well-equipped apartments with a large living room, fully equipped kitchen with butler's pantry, three bedrooms, two baths, and a maid's bedroom with bath. There were five apartments per floor, each of approximately 2750 square feet.

=== Southcourse Apartments ===
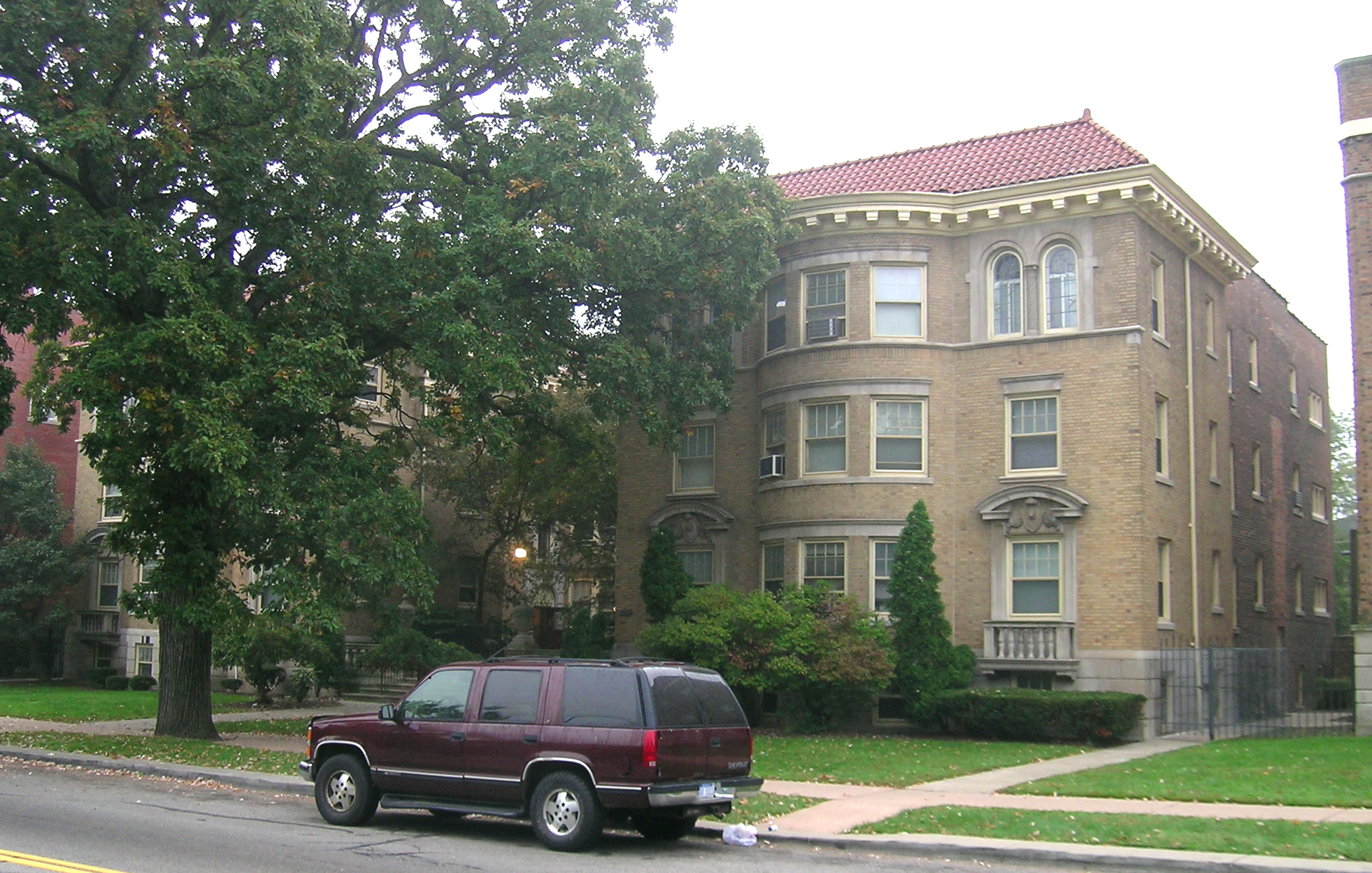
Southcourse Apartments

The Southcourse Apartments, located at 2003 W. McNichols, is a C-shaped building built of tan and brown brick with limestone trim. A raised entrance court between the arms of the C leads to two entryways in the inside arms of the C. Each entrance is through a paneled door set within a limestone arch. The two facades of the ends of the C have central semicircular flat-roofed bays stretching the height of the building. On the first floor, windows flanking the bays on are set behind stone balconies. Paired arched windows are on the third floor.

On the interior, the entryways lead to tiled vestibules, which lead to stairways. Each stair services two apartments per floor, for four on each floor. The apartments are large three bedroom two-bath units of about 2000 square feet.

=== Northcourse Apartments ===
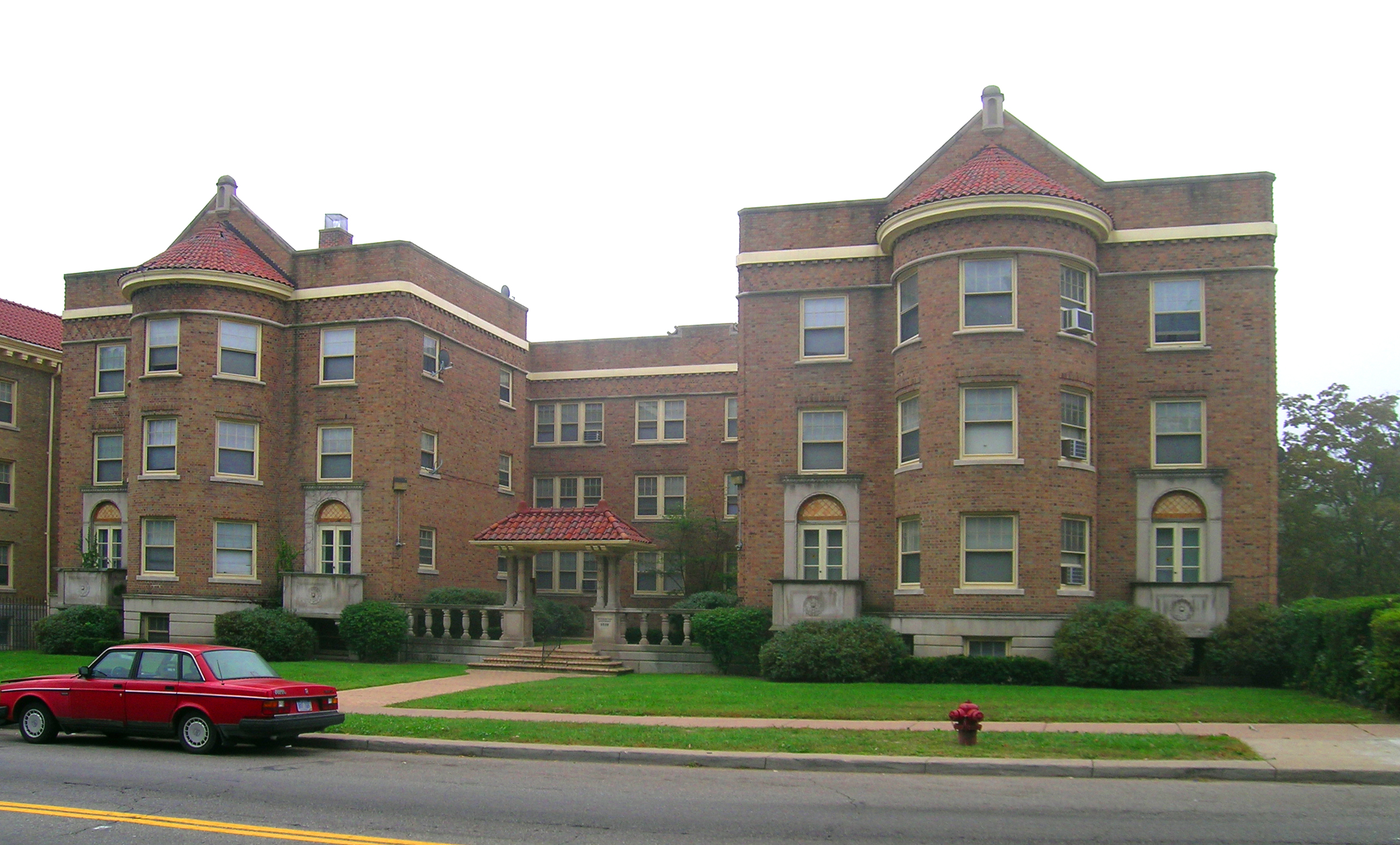
Northcourse Apartment

The Northcourse Apartments, located at 2025 W. McNichols, is also a C-shaped building built of tan and brown brick with limestone trim, with a similar raised entry court with two entryways. The two facades of the ends of the C have central semicircular bays with tile roofs stretching the height of the building. On each floor, French doors flanking the bays on are set behind stone balconies.

On the interior, the entryways lead to marble-lined vestibules, which lead to stairways. Each stair services three apartments per floor, for six on each floor. The apartments per floor are larger two-bedroom units of about 2000 square feet, and the remaining four are single-bedroom units of about 1200 square feet.

== See also ==
- Palmer Park
- Palmer Park Apartment Building Historic District
