= BNT (disambiguation) =

The Bulgarian National Television is the public broadcaster of Bulgaria.

BNT may also refer to:

== Language ==
- Bantu languages, spoken in Sub-Saharan Africa (ISO 639-5 code: bnt)
- Bridge and tunnel, a pejorative term for commuters into Manhattan, New York

== Businesses and organizations ==
- BioNTech, a German biotechnology company
- Brand New Theatre, an American student theater company in Los Angeles
- Bottlers Nepal, a Nepalese authorized manufacturer and distributor of some brands for the Coca-Cola company

== Other uses ==
- Bicentennial National Trail, foot/horseback trail along Australia's eastern side
- Brunei Darussalam Time, time in Brunei
