= Charles Merrill =

Charles Merrill may refer to:

- Charles Merrill (businessman) (1792–1872), American entrepreneur and lumber company owner
- Charles E. Merrill (1885–1956), American philanthropist, stockbroker and co-founder of Merrill Lynch & Company
- Charles E. Merrill Jr. (1920–2017), American educator, author and philanthropist
- Charles Merton Merrill (1907–1996), United States federal judge
- Charles Washington Merrill (1869–1958), American mining metallurgist
- Charles Merrill Hough (1858–1927), federal judge in New York City
