= Palmer Park Apartment Building Historic District =

Historic district in Michigan, United States

- U.S. National Register of Historic Places
- U.S. Historic district
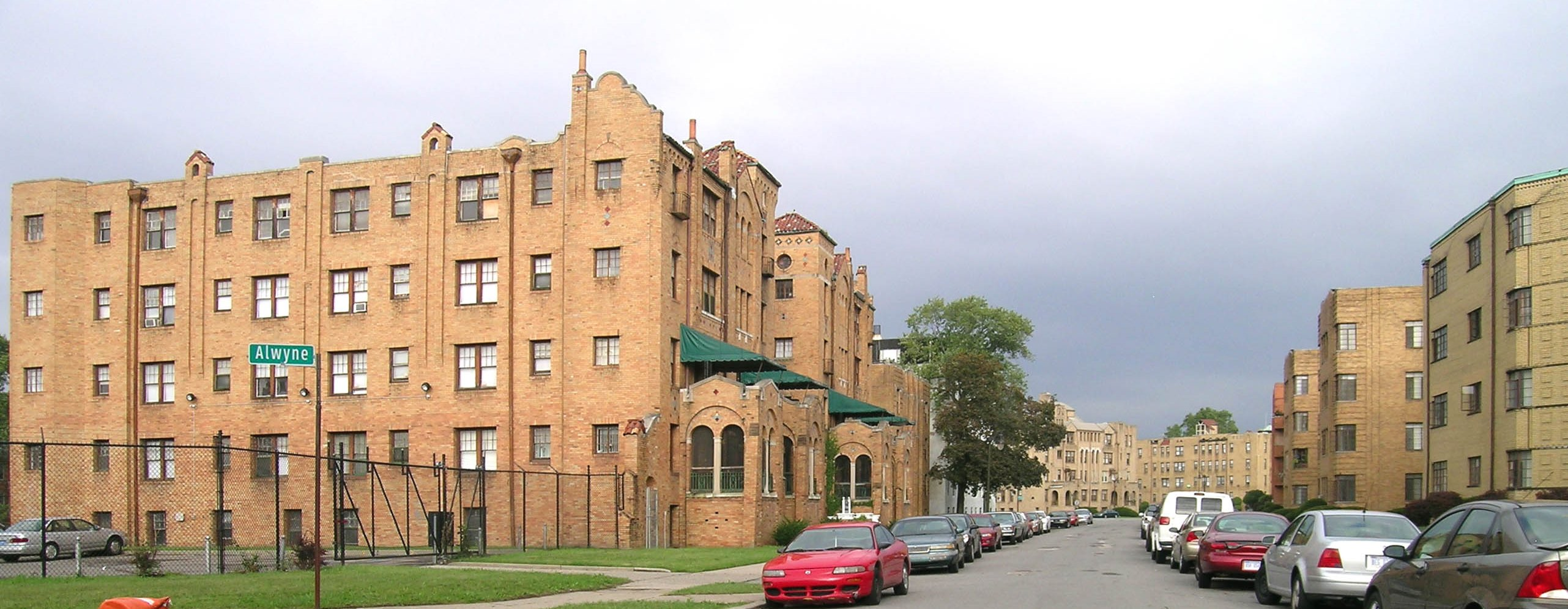
- Streetscape at Whitmore and Alwyne
- Interactive map
- Location: Detroit, Michigan, U.S.
- Coordinates: 42°25′11″N 83°6′37″W
- Built: 1925
- Architect: Multiple; Arnold & Fuger et al. (boundary increase)
- Architectural style: Mixed (more Than 2 Styles From Different Periods); International Style, Colonial Revival (boundary increase)
- NRHP reference No.: 83000895, 05000014 (boundary increase)
- Added to NRHP: May 21, 1983; February 11, 2005 (boundary increase)

The Palmer Park Apartment Building Historic District is a neighborhood located in Detroit, Michigan, bounded by Pontchartrain Boulevard on the west, McNichols Road on the south, and Covington Drive on the northeast. A boundary increase pushed the eastern boundary to Woodward Avenue. The district showcases some of the most ornate and most varied examples of apartment building design in Michigan, and was listed on the National Register of Historic Places in 1983 (with a boundary increase in 2005).

== History ==
The land that this historic district sits on, like the adjacent Palmer Park and nearby Palmer Woods Historic District, was once the estate of Thomas W. Palmer, a wealthy Detroiter and one-time US Senator. Palmer had intended to develop this area into a subdivision, but died in 1913 before bringing the idea to fruition. After Palmer's death, this portion of the estate was purchased by Walter Briggs. In 1925, Briggs hired Albert Kahn to design an apartment building in the area (this building, at 1001 Covington, was converted to condos in 2005). Forty buildings total were constructed in the district by multiple architects, including Weidmaier and Gay, Robert West, and William Kapp. Most of the buildings were constructed in the 1920s and 1930s, but development continued until 1965.

At one time Palmer Park had a large LGBT community and had numbers of bars, bookstores, and restaurants owned by gay people. At that time, the only way one could acquire an apartment in the area is if one already knew another resident in the complex. Crime and police harassment increased in the 1980s, and gay people began leaving. Wendy Case of Metro Times said "Ask three different people what happened to Palmer Park and you'll get three different answers. But all will eventually agree that crime is what dismantled Detroit's opportunity to have a gay renaissance akin to those of San Francisco and New York. The glorious art deco apartment buildings that were once at such a premium in this neighborhood are still there — but you no longer have to "know somebody" to get one. You just have to have to pony up about 300 bucks and be willing to live between a beautiful park and ungodly urban squalor." Craig Covey, formerly a member of the city council of Ferndale, said that most of the former gay residents of Palmer Park "tended to move up Woodward Avenue and they settled in Ferndale, Royal Oak and Birmingham depending on their economic abilities. The middle-class folks came to Ferndale and Pleasant Ridge, as I did." The "Hotter Than July!" annual LGBT festival is held in Palmer Park; the festival states that it caters to the "black same-gender-loving".

== Description ==
The buildings within the district were designed primarily for middle- and upper-middle-class residents. They are primarily five- and six-story structures, and incorporated the latest residential technology. The architecture, however varies into the realm of the exotic, with styles such as Egyptian, Spanish Colonial Revival, Mediterranean, Venetian, Tudor, and Moorish Revival represented, as well as severely plain 1930s Art Moderne and International Style buildings.

== Notable buildings in the district ==
- Temple Israel, 1950s building, now used as a church
- Palmer Park Chapel of The Church of Jesus Christ of Latter-day Saints, originally built for a Greek Orthodox Church.

== Education ==
Palmer Park is within the Detroit Public Schools district. Residents are zoned to Palmer Park Preparatory Academy, formerly the Barbara Jordan School, for elementary and middle school. All residents are zoned to Mumford High School. Palmer Park is operated by teachers and not by a principal administrator.

== Gallery ==
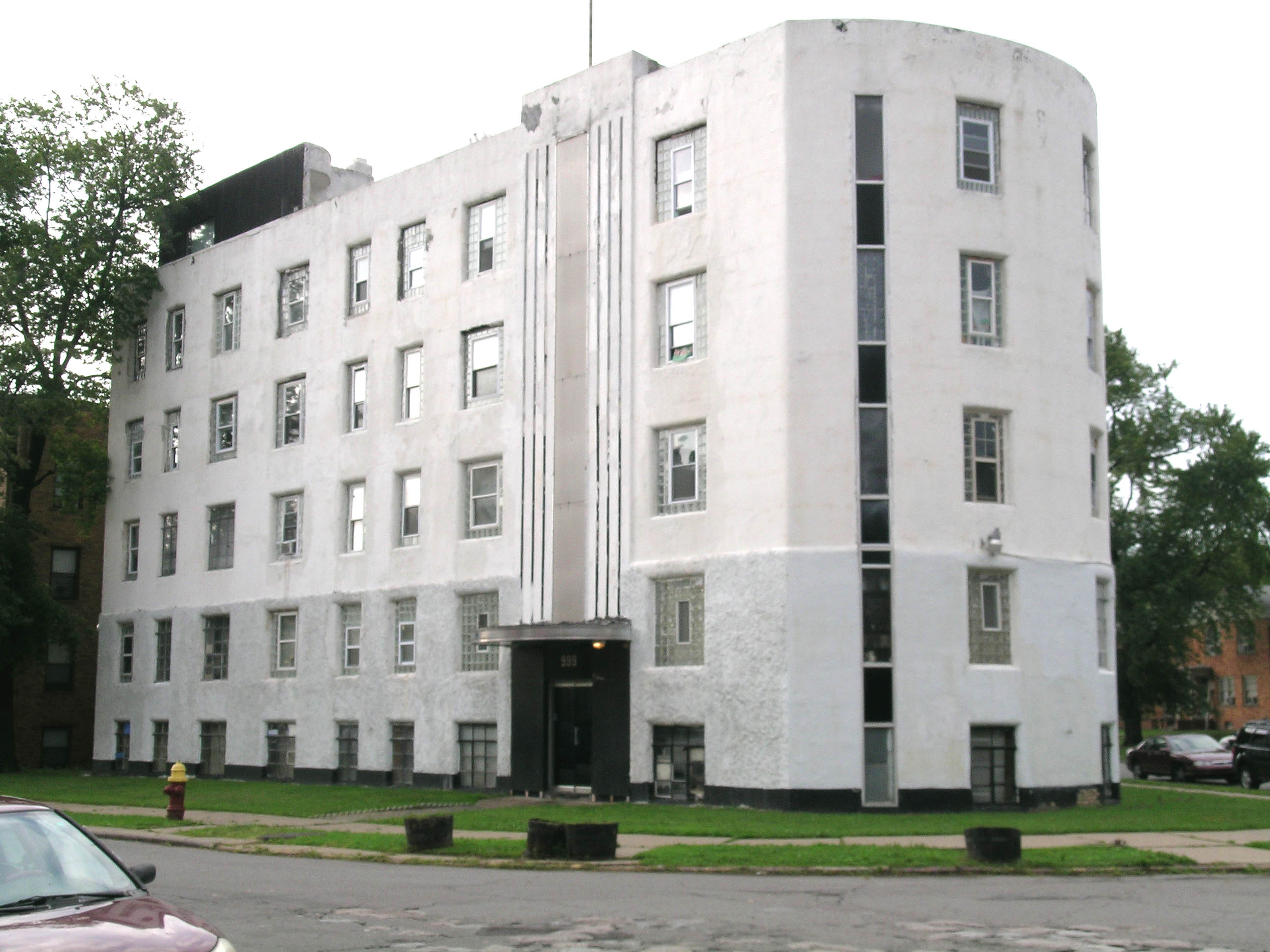
Apartment Building at Whitmore and Manderson

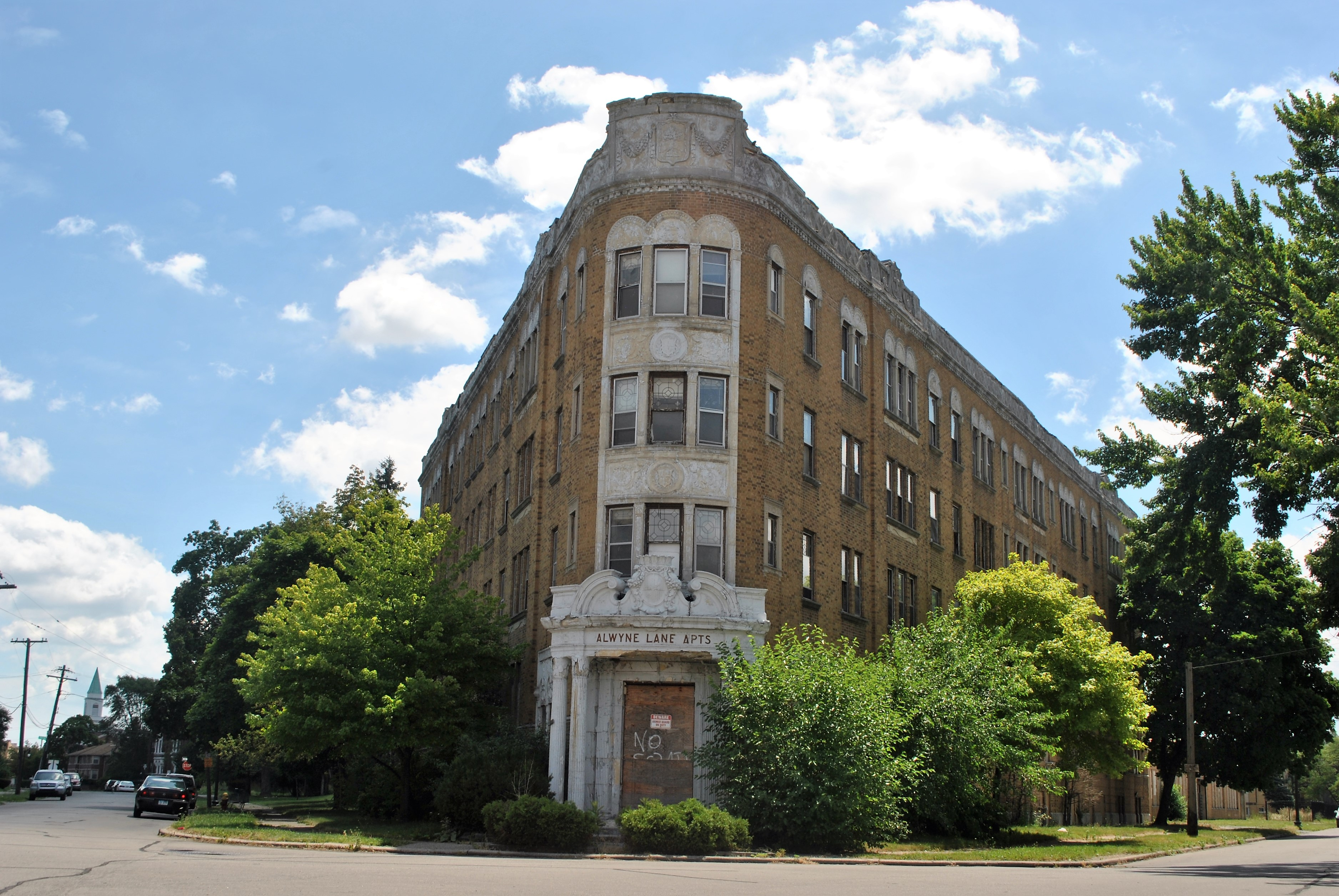
Alwyne Lane Apartments

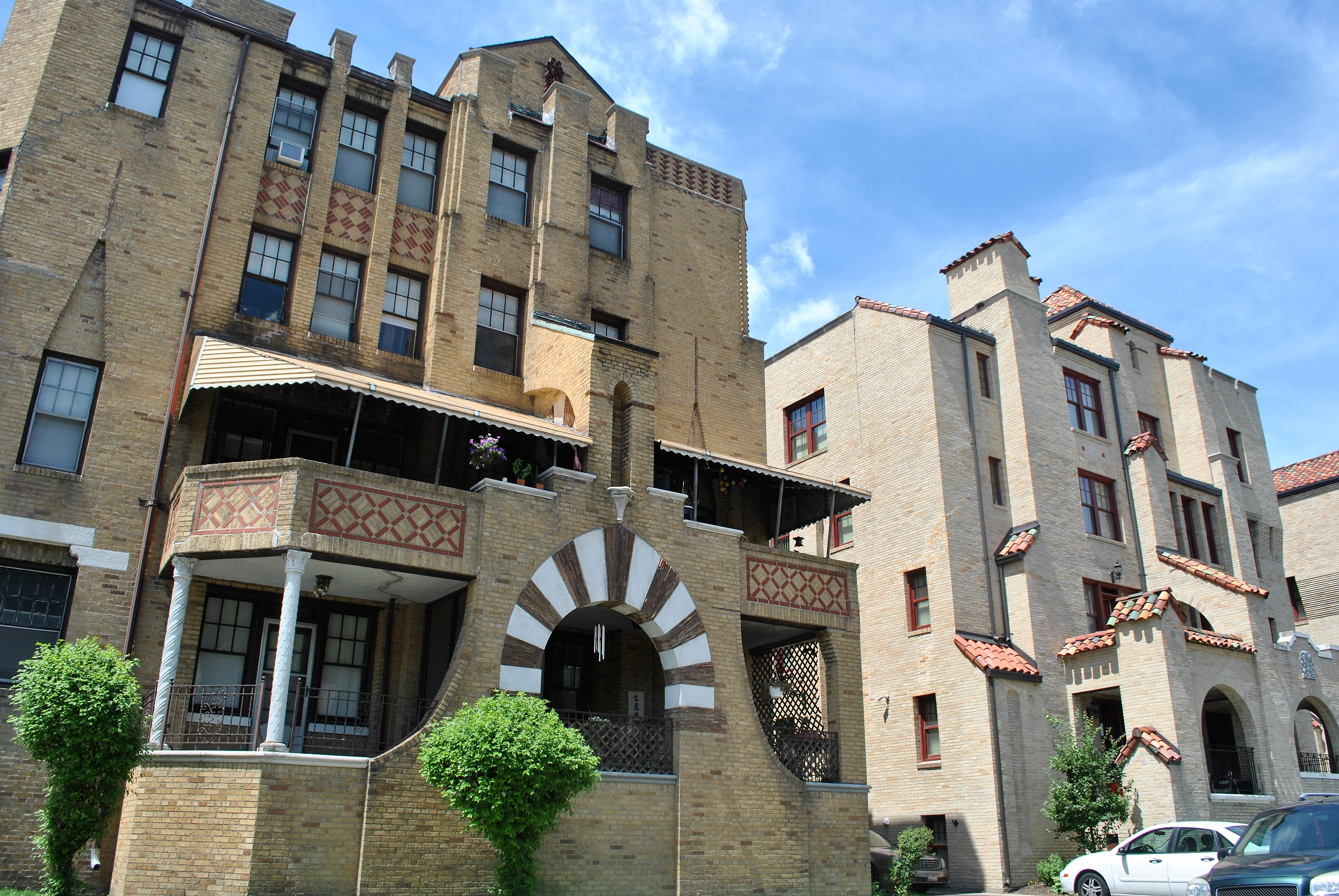
Palmer Park Apartment Building Historic District

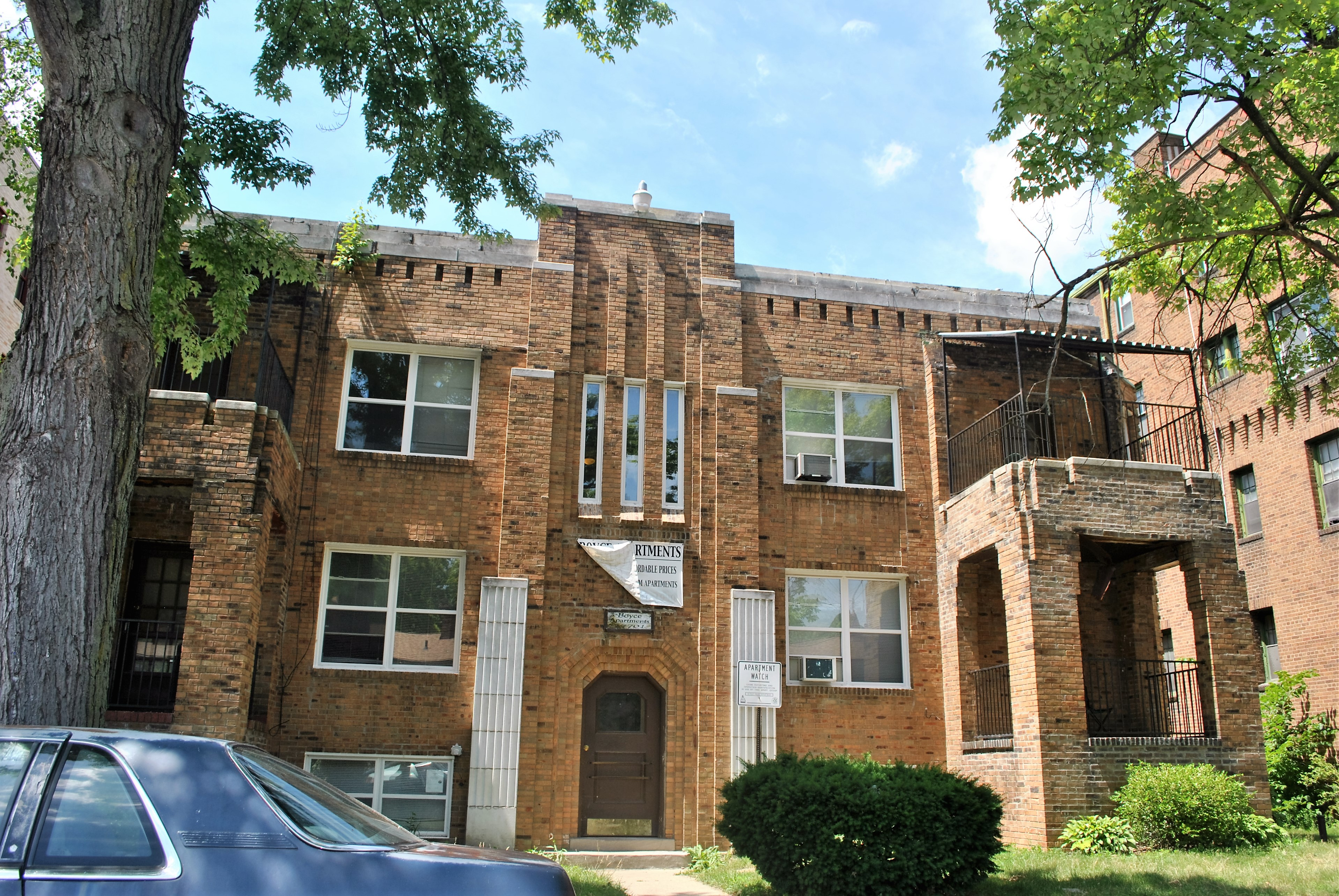
Boyce Apartments

== See also ==
- Palmer Park
- Palmer Park Boulevard Apartments District
