= Thomas W. Palmer =

American politician

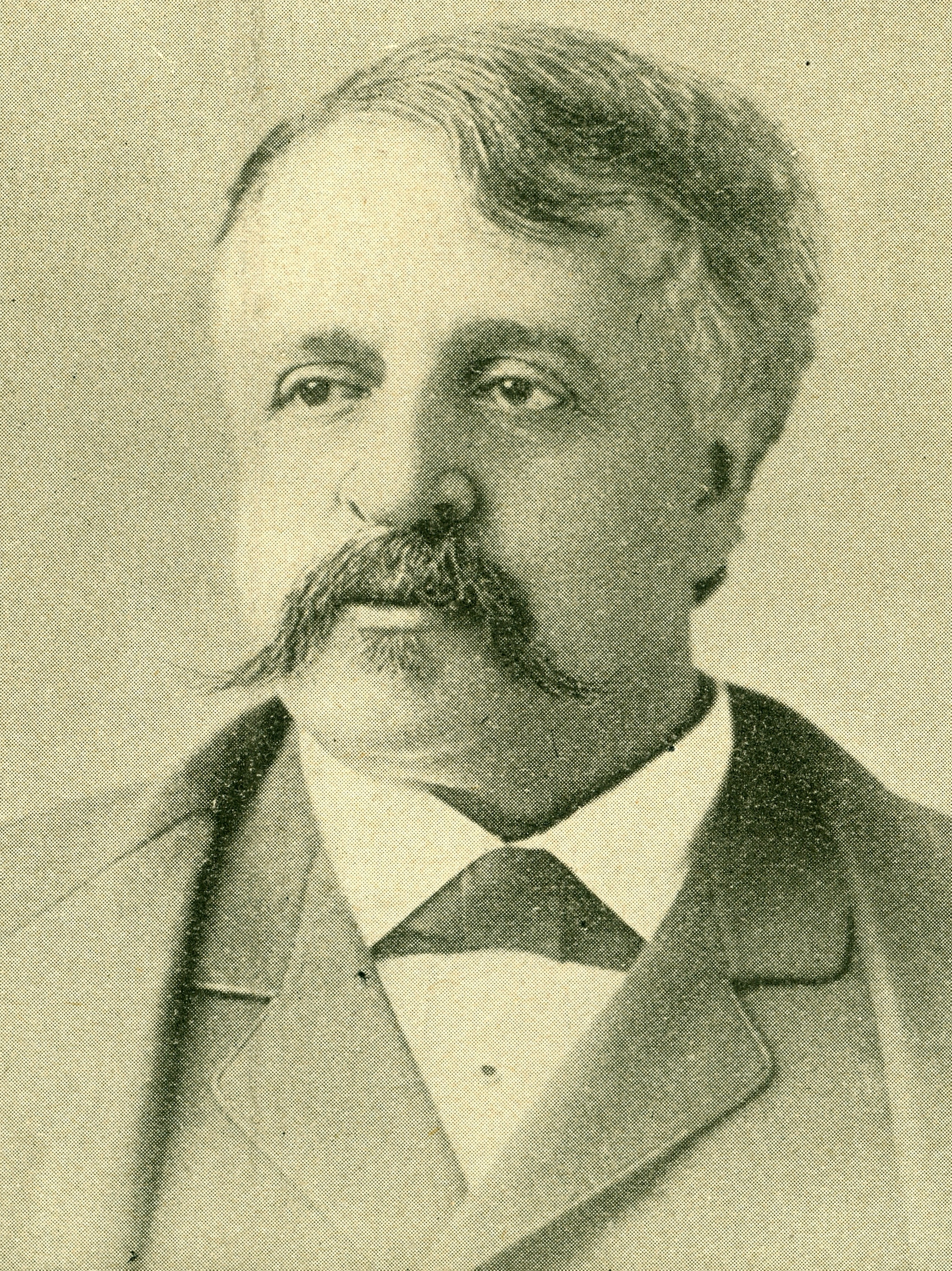

27th United States Minister to Spain
- In office June 17, 1889 – April 19, 1890
- President: Benjamin Harrison
- Preceded by: Perry Belmont
- Succeeded by: Edward Burd Grubb Jr.

United States Senator from Michigan
- In office March 4, 1883 – March 3, 1889
- Preceded by: Thomas W. Ferry
- Succeeded by: James McMillan

Member of the Michigan Senate from the 2nd district
- In office January 1, 1879 – December 31, 1880

Member of the Detroit Board of Estimates
- In office 1873

Personal details
- Born: Thomas Witherell Palmer; January 25, 1830 Detroit, Michigan, U.S.
- Died: June 1, 1913 (aged 83) Detroit, Michigan, U.S.
- Resting place: Elmwood Cemetery
- Party: Republican
- Spouse: Lizzie Pitts Merrill (m. 1855)
- Relations: James Witherell (maternal grandfather)
- Children: 1
- Parents: Thomas Palmer; Mary Witherell
- Education: University of Michigan
- Occupation: businessman, lumberman
- Profession: Politician

Thomas Witherell Palmer (January 25, 1830 – June 1, 1913) was a U.S. Senator from the state of Michigan. He is considered to be one of the most significant figures in the history of Detroit, Michigan.

Palmer was born in Detroit, where his mother was the daughter of the third Michigan Territorial Judge James Witherell, while his father was a New England merchant who had settled in the city following the War of 1812. Palmer attended the public schools, Thompson's Academy in Palmer (now St. Clair), and studied one year at the University of Michigan in Ann Arbor. He traveled to Spain and South America and then entered the real estate business in Detroit in 1853 and then engaged in lumbering and agricultural pursuits with his future father-in-law, Charles Merrill, beginning in 1855. He served on the first board of directors and as the first president for the Michigan Society for the Prevention of Cruelty to Animals (now known as the Michigan Humane Society).

He served on the Board of Estimates of Detroit in 1873 and was a member of the Michigan State Senate 1879–1880. He was elected as a Republican to the United States Senate in 1883 after decorated Senator Thomas W. Ferry handpicked Palmer as his successor. He served from March 4, 1883, to March 3, 1889. He was not a candidate for reelection. He was chairman of the Committee on Fisheries in the 49th Congress, and the Committee on Agriculture and Forestry in the 50th Congress. While in the Senate, he became known as an advocate for the women's suffrage movement, immigration restrictions, and homesteader rights. He is credited with coining a phrase widely adopted by latter-day reformers, Equal rights for all, special privileges to none. On February 6, 1885, he delivered a noted speech arguing in favor of an amendment to the U.S. Constitution granting women's suffrage.

Palmer was appointed United States Minister to Spain on March 12, 1889, by U.S. President Benjamin Harrison and served from June 17, 1889, to April 19, 1890. He was president of the National Commission of the World Columbian Exposition in Chicago 1890–1893. He retired to his Wayne County farm near Detroit.

Palmer and his wife, Lizzie Pitts Merrill Palmer, became known for their generous gifts to the city of Detroit. Among his activities, Palmer was one of the major benefactors of the Michigan Soldiers and Sailors Monument erected at Campus Martius. In honor of his mother, he built the Mary W. Palmer Memorial Church. He was also one of the founders and the first president of the Detroit Museum of Art (now known as the Detroit Institute of Arts), to which he contributed $16,000 and its current building stands on the site of Palmer's former home.

Lizzie Palmer in 1901 commissioned the Merrill Fountain in Campus Martius, dedicated in honor of her father. New York architects Carrere and Hastings are responsible for the design. The fountain was moved to Palmer Park in 1926. She bequeathed $3 million to found the Merrill-Palmer Institute in 1916, which is a national center for child and family development and is now affiliated with Wayne State University and located in the former house of Charles Lang Freer.

In 1897, Palmer donated 140 acres (60 hectares) of land along Woodward Avenue to the city for use as a public park. This land formed the basis of Palmer Park. Palmer had inherited the land from his grandfather Michigan Territorial Judge James Witherell. In 1885, the Palmers had had the prominent architecture firm of Mason & Rice design a rustic log cabin-style summer house on the land, which still remains in the park, although it is currently closed to visitors.

Palmer was a Unitarian and a member of the Freemasons. He died in Detroit and is interred in Elmwood Cemetery.

== Bibliography ==
- Dictionary of American Biography
- Burton, M. Agnes. "Thomas W. Palmer." Michigan Pioneer and Historical Society Collections 39 (1915): 208–17
- Burton, Clarence. "Thomas W. Palmer," The City of Detroit, Michigan: 1701-1922, v. VI. Detroit: S.J. Clarke Publishing Company, 1922.
- Ziewacz, Lawrence E. "The Eighty-First Ballot: The Senatorial Struggle of 1883." Michigan History 56 (Fall 1972): 216-32

U.S. Senate
Preceded by Thomas W. Ferry	U.S. senator (Class 2) from Michigan; 1883–1889; Served alongside: Omar D. Conger and Francis B. Stockbridge	Succeeded by James McMillan
Diplomatic posts
Preceded by Perry Belmont	U.S. Minister to Spain; 1889–1890	Succeeded by Edward Burd Grubb Jr.
