= Hayneedle =

Online retail company based in Omaha, Nebraska

Hayneedle, Inc.
- Type: Online Retailer
- Industry: eCommerce, Online shopping, Retail, Homewares, Furnishings
- Founded: 2002
- Headquarters: Omaha, Nebraska, United States
- Key people: Shelley Huff (President)
- Products: Indoor & outdoor home furnishings, electronics and decorations
- Revenue: US$350 million
- Owner: Walmart
- Number of employees: 800
- Website: hayneedle.com

Hayneedle was an online retail company based in Omaha, Nebraska with a focus on furnishings and decor. In 2016, Hayneedle was acquired by Jet.com, which later became a subsidiary of Walmart.

== History ==
Hayneedle began in 2002 when Doug Nielsen, Julie Mahloch and Mark Hasebroock purchased a single online store, Hammocks.com, from a llama farmer in rural Washington state. Over the next few years, the company opened more online stores, each focused on one particular type of product, developing a portfolio of sites focused on indoor and outdoor home furnishings, accents, and decor. In 2005, the company unified under the name NetShops, and continued its category expansion. By acquiring Duluth, Minn.-based Thralow, Inc. in 2006, the company gained properties Telescopes.com and Binoculars.com, and underwent an internal restructuring.

In 2009, the company rebranded as Hayneedle and further expanded its selection to include more items focused in the areas of office, kitchen, bedding, pet supplies, lighting, home storage, and home improvement, among others. In the spring of 2014, all 300+ sites previously in operation under Hayneedle, Inc. were rolled into hayneedle.com.

In 2016, Hayneedle was acquired by e-commerce retailer Jet.com and later became part of the Walmart family of brands. In 2017, Hayneedle launched an advertising campaign focusing on "the love of home."

In 2023, Hayneedle announced it would be redirecting customers to walmart.com/hayneedle and has since shut down its website.
