= Charles Merrill (businessman) =

American entrepreneur (1792–1872)

- Born: January 3, 1792; Falmouth, Massachusetts, US
- Died: December 28, 1872 (aged 80); Detroit, Michigan, US
- Known for: Lumber business
- Political party: Whig then Republican
- Spouse: Frances Pitts
- Children: Elizabeth "Lizzie" Merrill Palmer

Charles Merrill (January 3, 1792 – December 28, 1872) was an American entrepreneur who owned mercantile, construction, real estate, and lumber companies in Maine, Virginia, and Michigan.

== Early life ==
Charles Merrill was born in Falmouth, Massachusetts, on January 3, 1792 (the area became part of Maine in 1820). He was the seventh of the children of James Merrill - who was a citizen of Falmouth. Merrill spent his earlier years on his father's farm and obtained an education attending the common school during the winter.

== Early business career ==
When he became of age, he moved to nearby Portland, Massachusetts, and in partnership with his brother and a man with the last name of Scott engaged in mercantile business under the firm of S & C Merrill & Company. The business proved unsuccessful and heavy debts were incurred. Once the firm was dissolved, Merrill moved to Virginia, where he took a subcontract on a railroad leading from Petersburg, which was then in progress of construction. He was successful in this new business venture and made enough money to pay off the debts he had incurred in his previous business in Portland. After returning to Portland, he took a contract building a military road from Lincoln to Houlton. The building of this road, and the familiarity it gave him with lands and localities, caused him to become a large investor in the area's real estate from 1835 to 1840.

His company subsequently pushed their enterprises to Michigan. Beginning in 1836, he made large investments in Michigan with then ex-Governor Abner Coburn. Their purchases were located on the Black River in St. Clair County. When the panic of 1837 came, his Maine partners proposed to withdraw from the joint ownership of lands on condition that Merrill would assume and pay all the indebtedness upon them. He accepted and in order to facilitate his care of these lands, he moved from Portland to Lincoln. For eleven years he was engaged in lumbering his lands.

== Business in Michigan ==
By 1848, the lumbering potential of Michigan began to attract increasing attention and Merrill moved to Detroit in order to begin the lumbering of the lands he had purchased there in 1836. In subsequent years he purchased extensive tracts of pine lands in various parts of Michigan and soon became one of the largest pine lands lumberers. He built sawmills in Saginaw and Muskegon, and at Falmouth in Missaukee County.

In 1858, he built the Merrill Block on the corner of Woodward and Jefferson Avenues - at the time it was considered a notable business building in Detroit. In 1863, Merrill added a business partner, Thomas W. Palmer.

== Personal life ==
He married Frances Pitts, daughter of Major Thomas Pitts of Charlestown, Massachusetts, in December 1836. His only child, Elizabeth "Lizzie" Merrill, married his business partner, Thomas W. Palmer.

Merrill was noted for his careful and methodical work habits. Merrill was an advocate of temperance and was always ready to give his countenance and support to temperance movements. In political affairs he was a Whig until the organization of the Republican party and thereafter acknowledged allegiance to that party. His retiring disposition kept him from political prominence.

He frequently provided financing for his business associates. Merrill was known for supporting those in need. He was a prominent supporter of the Unitarian Church, being one of the founders of Detroit's Unitarian Society. He contributed largely to the erection of the Unitarian Church's first building in Detroit and was a trustee of the church from its inception until his death.

== Death ==
Merrill died in Detroit on December 28, 1872.

== Memorials ==
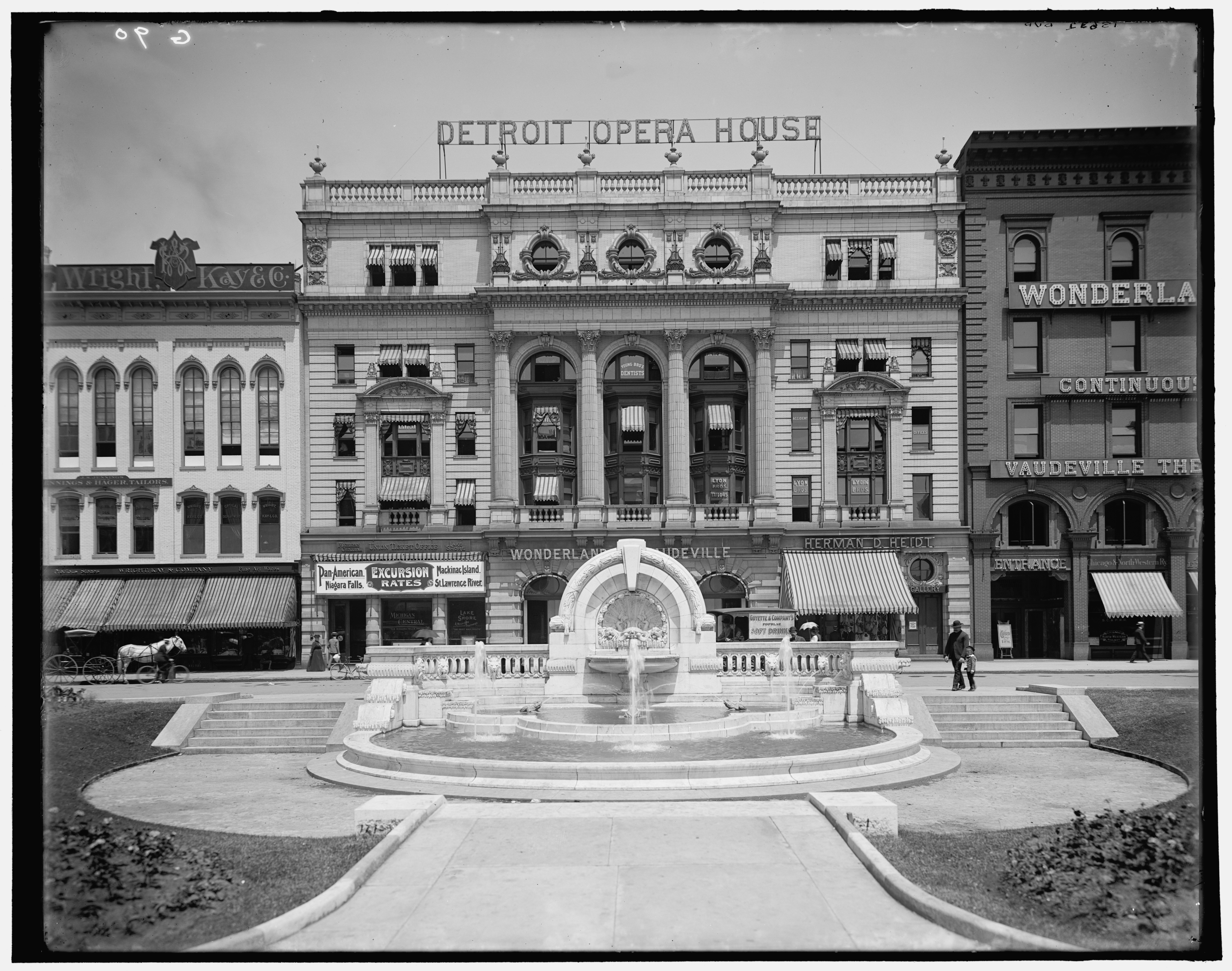
Merrill Humane Fountain, in front of the old Detroit Opera House, taken between 1901 and 1906

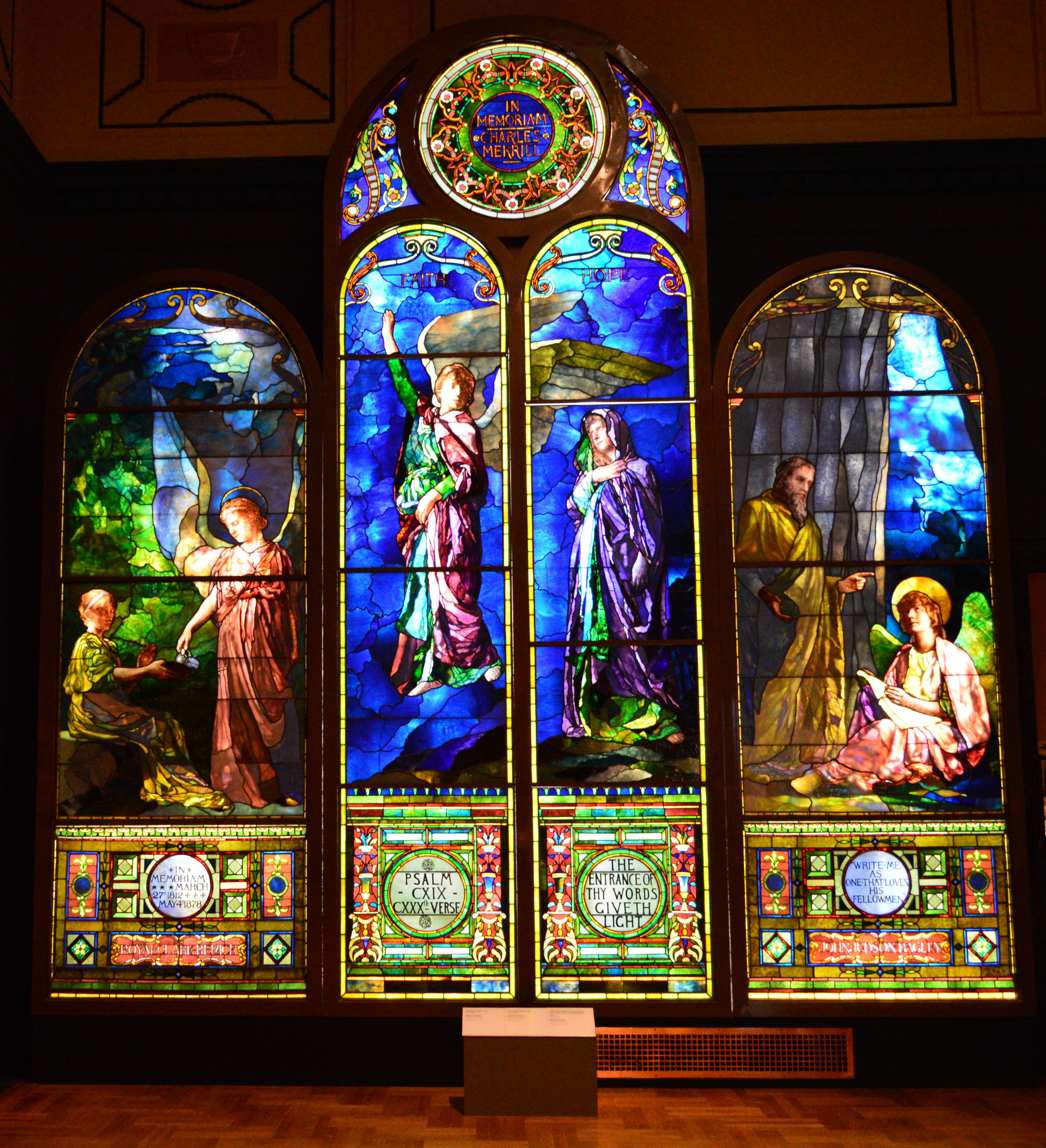
Stained glass windows of the First Unitarian Church of Detroit, on display at the Detroit Institute of Arts

His daughter, Elizabeth Palmer, had a fountain designed by the architectural firm of Carrère and Hastings and built in his honor in 1904 at a cost of US$1,000,000 (equivalent to $35,833,333 in 2025). The Merrill Humane Fountain was originally located in front of the old Detroit Opera House in Campus Martius Park. As automobile traffic increased in downtown Detroit, the city's elders decided to move the fountain to the Merrill Plaissance, at the far southern boundary of Palmer Park, in 1926.

A set of windows designed by John La Farge, now in the collection of the Detroit Institute of Arts, were memorial windows dedicated to three trustees of the First Unitarian Church of Detroit. The central grouping of windows was dedicated to Charles Merrill and features two lancets entitled "Faith" (center left) and "Hope" (center right). The inscription beneath "Hope" comes from Psalm 119, reading "The entrance of thy words giveth light." The windows were created in 1899 when the First Unitarian Church of Detroit built the congregation's second site. Eventually, the building was sold to the Church of Christ and the windows were removed when the widening of Woodward Avenue was planned in 1936, necessitating a modification and move of the church building. The windows were never reinstalled and ultimately all but one of the windows were donated to the Detroit Institute of Arts in 1959 by the Unitarian Church Trust. The DIA windows were restored between 1988 and 1991 by Mary Clerkin Higgins and were dedicated in April 1991.
