= Palmer Park (Detroit) =

Park in Detroit, Michigan, United States

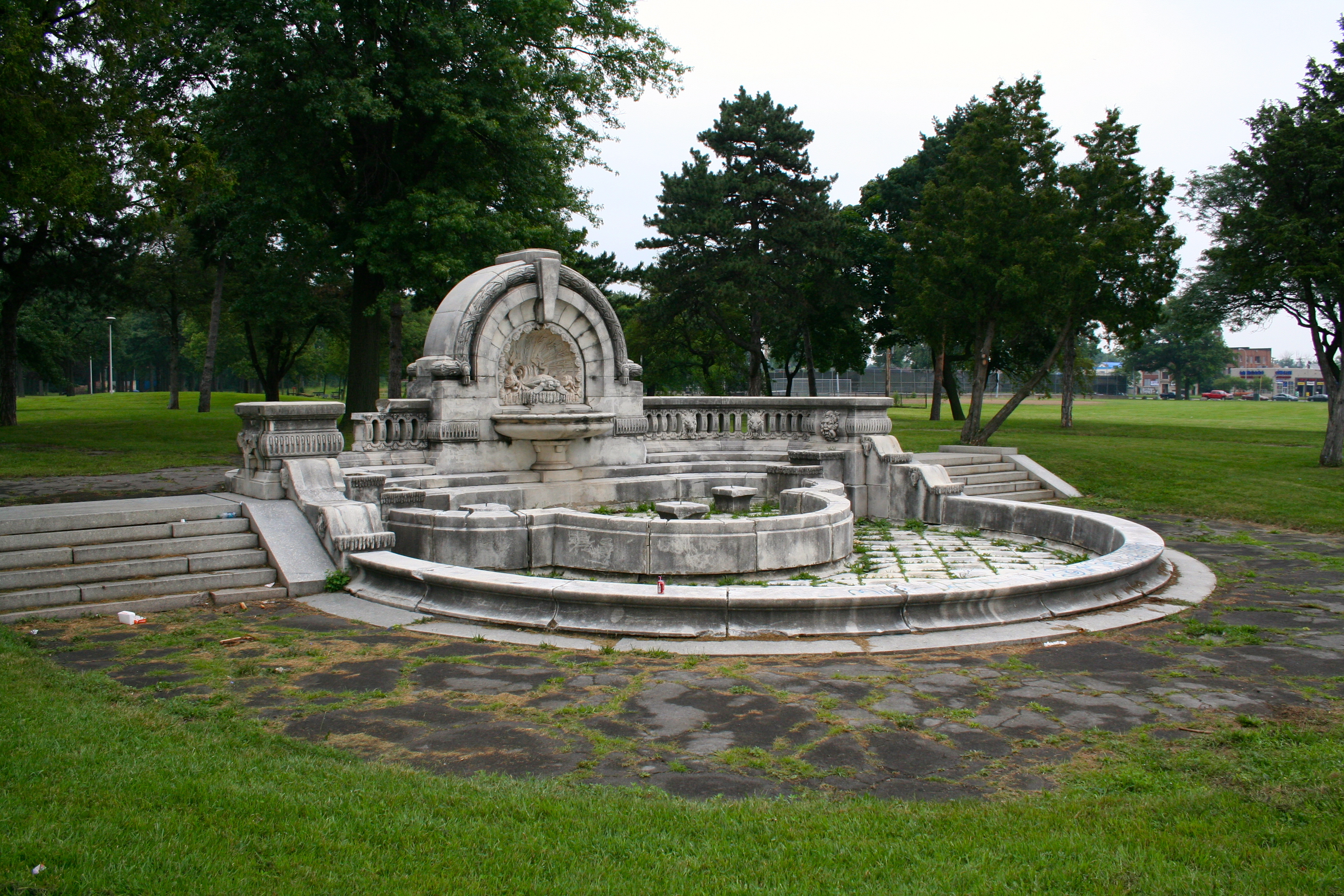
- Palmer Park's Merrill Humane Fountain, July 2013
- Interactive map of Palmer Park
- Location: Detroit, Michigan
- Coordinates: 42.4263°N 83.1180°W
- Area: 296-acre (120 ha)
- Created: 1895
- Operator: City of Detroit
- Open: All year
- Status: Open
- Public transit: DDOT 4, 7, 23, 32; SMART FAST Woodward 461, 462

Palmer Park is a 296-acre (120 ha) public park next to Detroit, Michigan's Palmer Park Apartment Building Historic District. It is named for U.S. Senator Thomas Witherell Palmer, who initially created the park when he donated 140-acre (57 ha) for a city park in 1893 on the condition that the virgin forest be preserved. A 2014 review of Library of Congress records confirmed the existence of a long forgotten sketch for part of Palmer Park by famed landscape architect Frederick Law Olmsted Sr. The park includes a historic log cabin, a public disc golf course, tennis courts, hiking and biking trails and a large pond known as Lake Frances.

== History ==
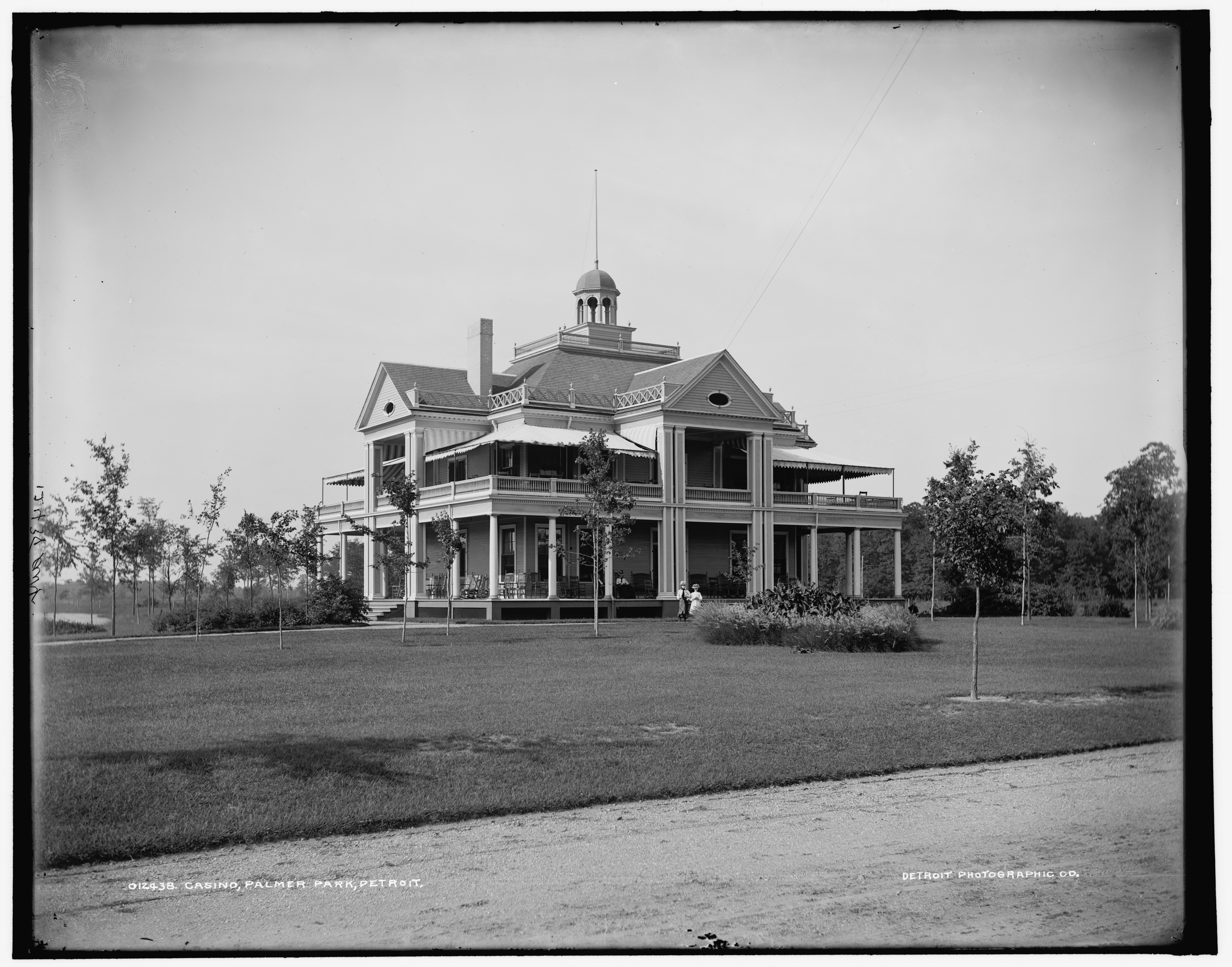
Casino in Palmer Park, taken between 1890 and 1901

U.S. Senator Thomas Witherell Palmer donated 140-acre (57 ha) for a city park in 1893, on the condition that the virgin forest be preserved. Palmer had inherited 80 acres from his grandfather, Michigan politician and Judge, James Witherell and, in his lifetime, expanded his holdings to 640 acres. Palmer continued to donate land throughout his life, and following his death, and that of his wife, Lizzie Pitts Merrill Palmer, his benefactors subdivided what became known as the Palmer Park Apartment Building Historic District, which is now a part of the National Register of Historic Places. A total of 296-acre (120 ha) was allocated to Palmer Park. The name that Palmer gave it, Log Cabin Park, did not stick and in 1897, the Detroit Common Council unanimously approved an ordinance to officially rename it Palmer Park.

The park had a large white wooden casino, which burned down in May 1945.

The city planned to close Palmer Park in 2010 due to budget constraints, but relented after a public rally.

=== Palmer Park Citizens Action Council ===
During the 1970s and early 1980s, the Palmer Park Citizens Action Council staged festivals, ran a CB radio patrol, and received several park-improvement grants.

=== People for Palmer Park ===
People for Palmer Park is a nonprofit organization created in 2010 that, with the Detroit government's blessing, supports renovation and revitalization work in the park. On June 24, 2012, the group partnered with the City of Detroit to open the Palmer Log Cabin to the public as part of a fundraiser to restore the structure.

== Palmer Park Golf Course ==
Palmer Park Golf Course was an 18-hole regulation length golf course within the park that hosted golf outings and tournaments through the Palmer Park Golf club. Established in 1927, Palmer Park Golf Course was home turf for many notable Detroit residents including Motown performers Marvin Gaye, The Temptations, Four Tops, and boxer Joe Louis. The course had a short layout that was mostly flat.

The course was owned by the City of Detroit and managed by private entities. Due to rising maintenance costs and reduced play, the City closed the course permanently in 2018.

On July 31, 2021 Chris McTaggart organized a field day to show the potential of a Disc Golf Course to take over “the old back 9” of the abandoned golf course. This was well received and on December 3, 2021, 18 disc golf baskets, temporary signage and temporary natural tee boxes were installed and play began for many eager players. Formal tees were installed in concrete in July 2022.

The “Detroit Palmer Park Disc Golf Course,” designed by Chad Fraquelli, is now one of the highest rated courses in Metro Detroit.

== Lake Frances ==
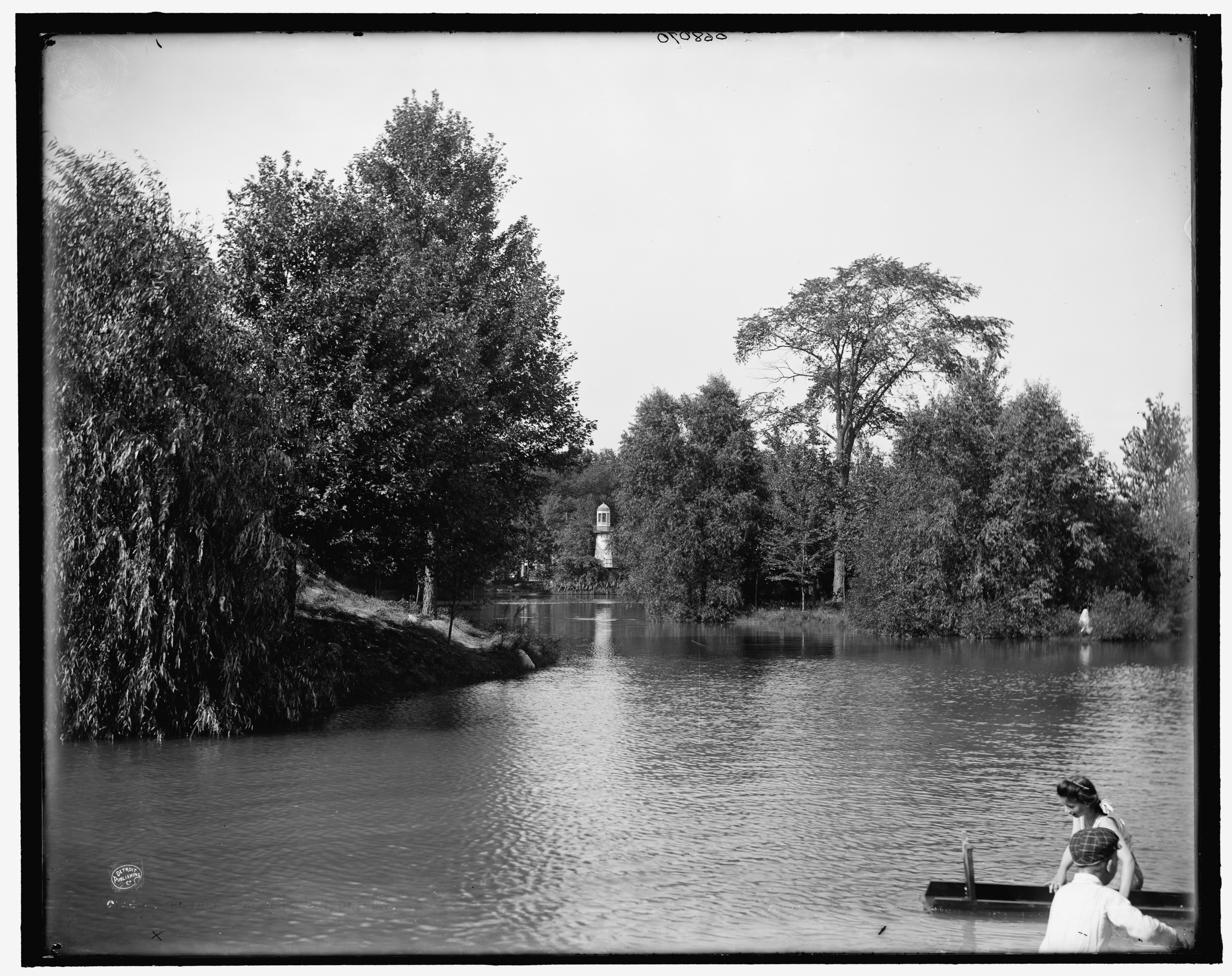
Lake Frances, taken between 1900 and 1910

A man-made lake dotted with small islands and anchored by a miniature red-and-white lighthouse that was once lit with an oil lamp. It was created at Senator Palmer's behest and named for his mother-in-law.

The Recreation Department created a second lake west of the current site of the Splash Park, to use as a fish breeding pond. Beyond it to the west, was Lake Harold with an island called Inselruh and a waterfall called Pontiac Cascade. Local legend states that the great Chief Pontiac was buried near the site of the waterfall. In the 1950s, Lake Harold was filled with earth excavated during the construction of the Lodge Freeway.

== Merrill Humane Fountain ==
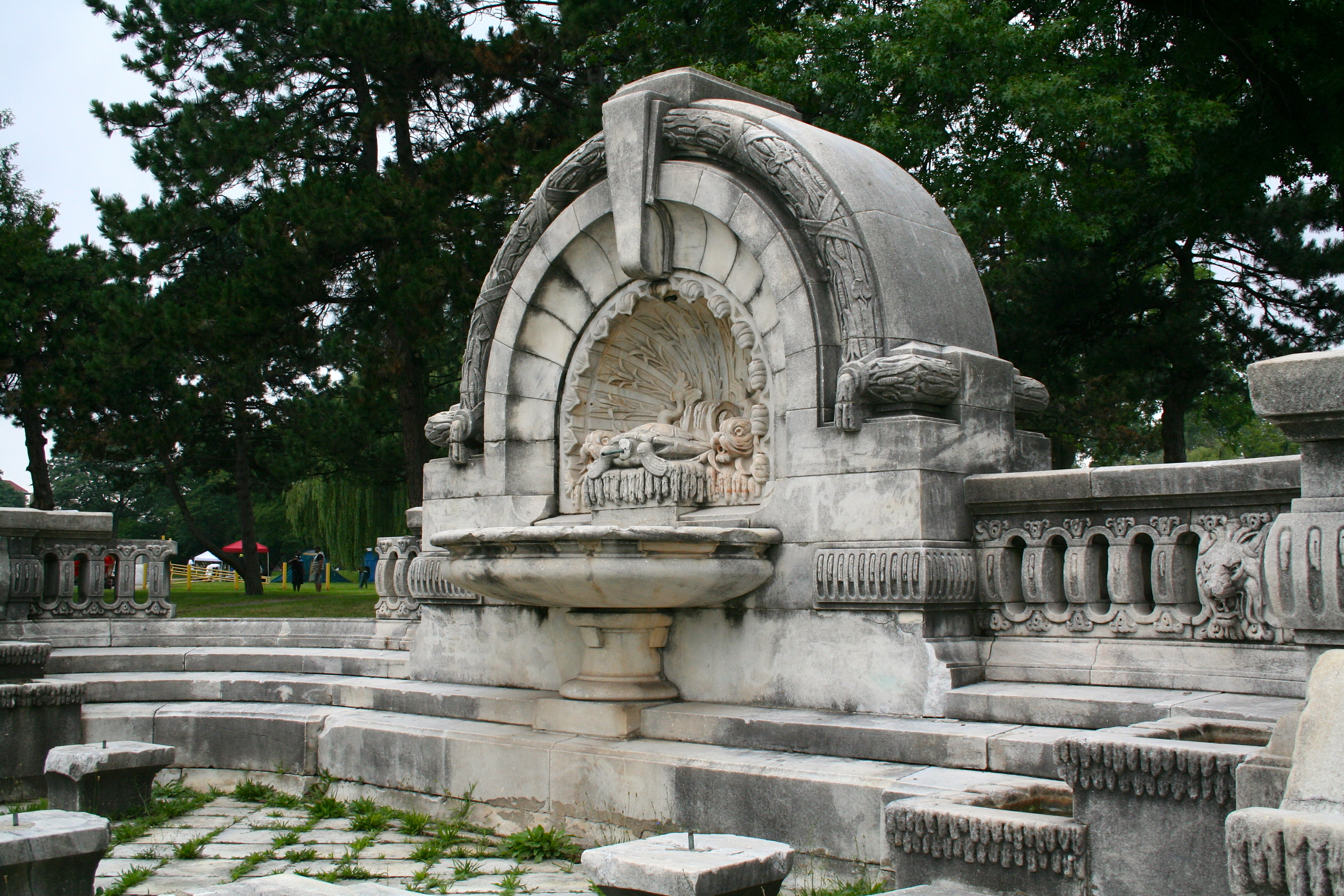
Merrill Humane Fountain in July 2013

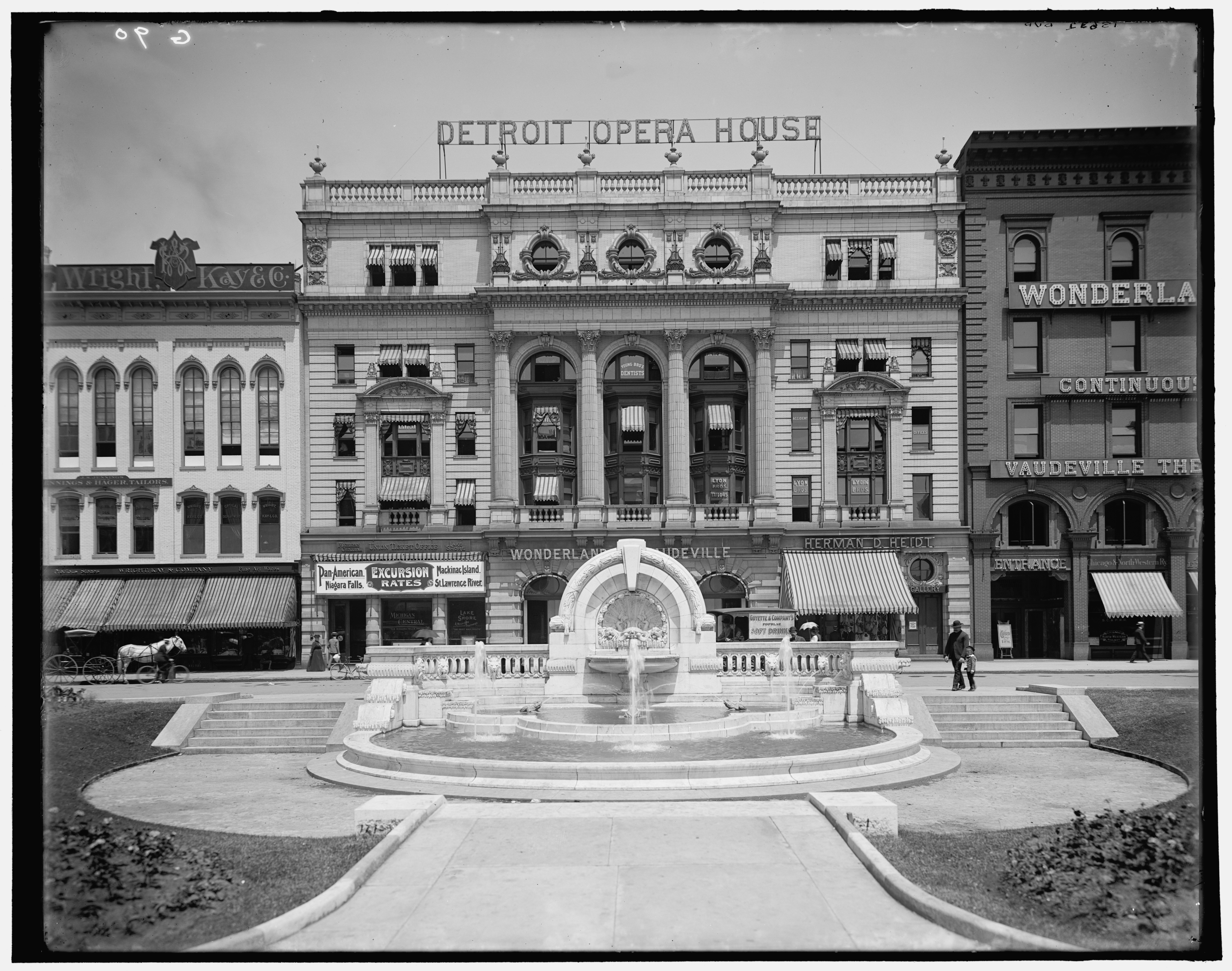
Merrill Humane Fountain, in front of the old Detroit Opera House

The Merrill Fountain was designed by the architectural firm of Carrère and Hastings and originally stood in front of the old Detroit Opera House in Campus Martius Park. Built in 1904 at a cost of US$1,000,000 (equivalent to $35,833,333 in 2025), it was named for Charles Merrill and dedicated by his daughter, Elizabeth Palmer. As automobile traffic increased in downtown Detroit, the city's elders decided to move the fountain to the Merrill Plaissance, at the far southern boundary of Palmer Park, in 1926. The fountain functioned for one season in the park and then pipes broke. It has been dry for over 50 years and suffered from theft of pieces and destruction by vandals.

The fountain is a white marble structure in the Italian Renaissance style. In the forefront is a circular pool leading up one level to another pool which is clover-shaped with three marble blocks in the center, each with a water spout. At the top of the fountain is an arch carved into cattails and water lilies over a niche containing a marble turtle straddled by two stylized fish. From the mouths of the figures water spouts lead to a vase-like pool beneath. Three steps lead from the clover-shaped pool to a balustrade on either side of the arch. The balusters are decorated with glyphs, four lion heads, and two gargoyles at the huge end posts; all of which spout water into the clover-shaped pool. Two scrolls dip from each post to the wall which surrounds the lower circular pool. Another small pool lies behind the arch and two small fountains hang off each end post of the balustrade.

== Palmer Log Cabin ==
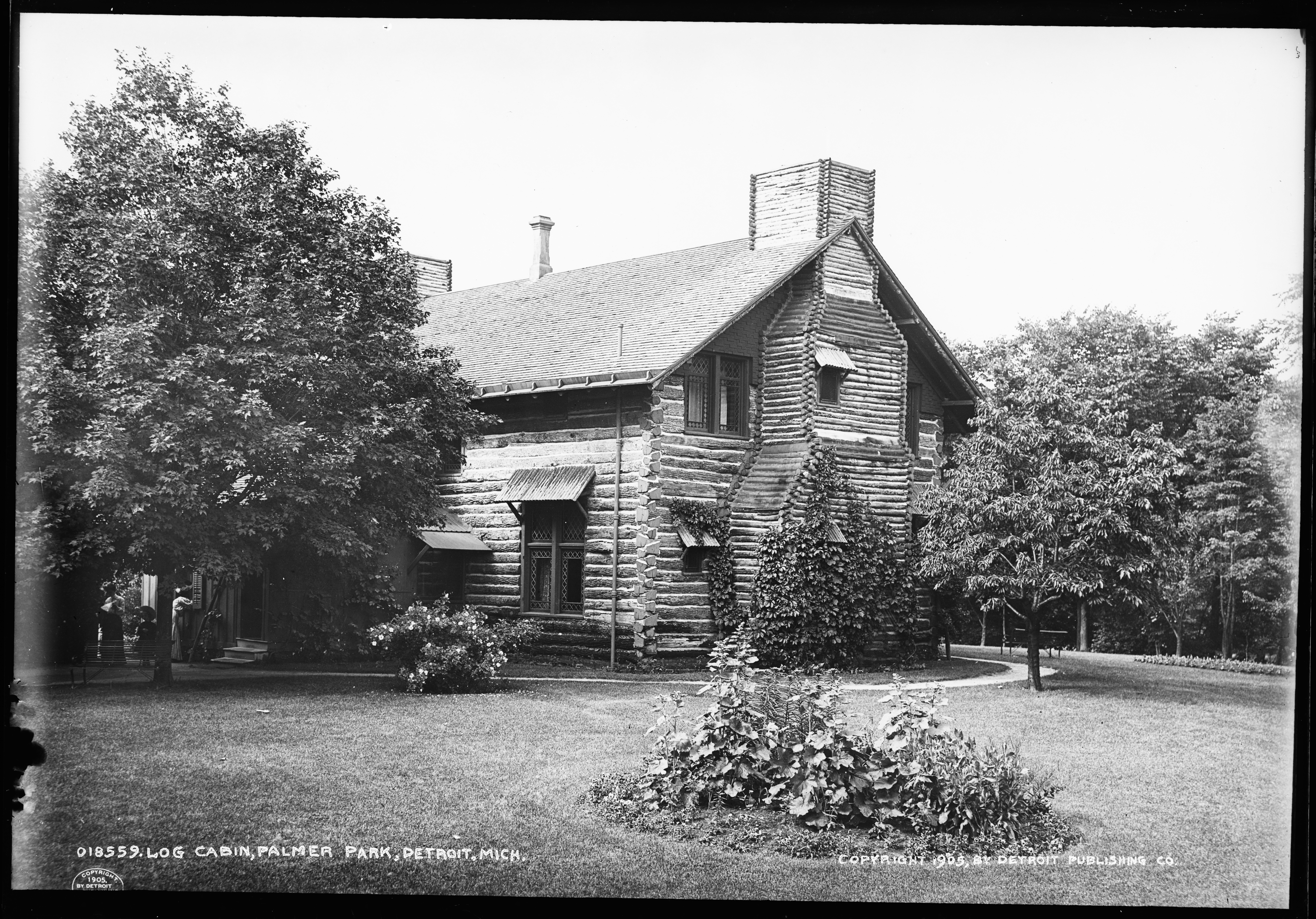
Palmer Log Cabin in 1905

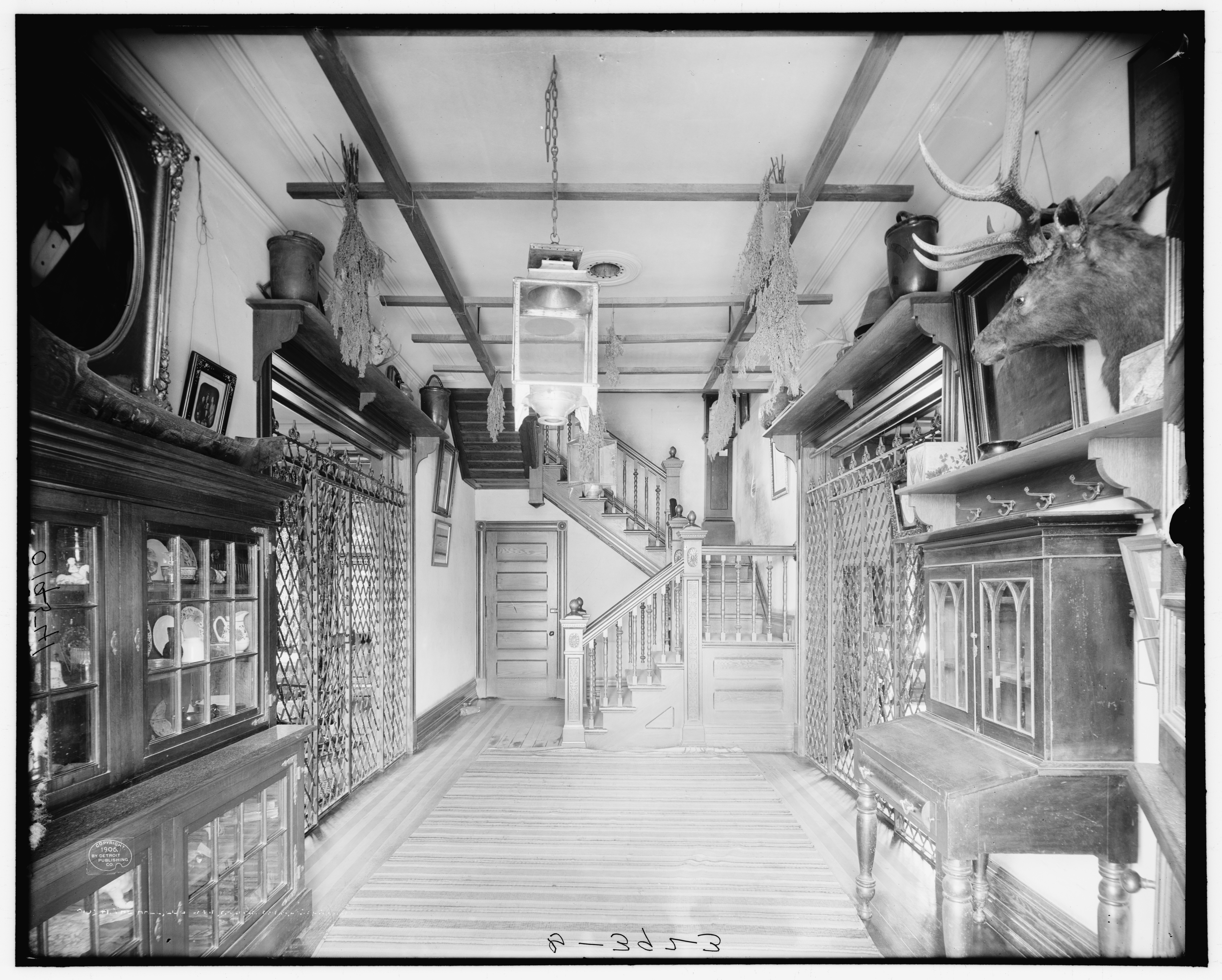
The hall in Palmer Log Cabin in 1906

In 1885, U.S. Senator Thomas Witherell Palmer had the architecture firm of Mason & Rice design a rustic log cabin-style summer house on land which now comprises part of Palmer Park. The design was a gift for his wife, Lizzie Merrill Palmer, who was growing weary of the traffic, noise and crowds of the city. She wanted a retreat where she could live as people had in the early days: simply, peacefully, and on plenty of land. Construction on the cabin was complete in 1887. It sits near the bank of Lake Frances. The Palmer Log Cabin was originally known as “Font Hill Log House.”

The Palmers were not ostentatious people, who enjoyed spending their summers at the log cabin and sharing it with their neighbors as well as friends and acquaintances from all over the nation. In 1911, a writer for a horse-breeding gazette recalled that “there was no formality” at Log Cabin feasts; “Dinner,” he wrote, “was announced with an old tin horn.” Whenever a fellow Senator visited, Palmer asked him to plant a tree, from which he hung a brass plaque engraved with his name.

For a period, the Log Cabin was a major tourist attraction, and in the summer visitors from all over the world thronged in for a look. It stayed open until 1979, when the city gave its artifacts to the Detroit Historical Society for safekeeping and closed the Log Cabin to the public. It served as a community center during the 1960s before it closed due to a lack of city funding. On June 24, 2012, the group People for Palmer Park partnered with the City of Detroit to open the cabin to the public for only the second time since 1979, as part of a fundraiser to restore the building's roof. On June 24, 2016, the City of Detroit announced the start of a $400,000 restoration of Palmer Park's historic Log Cabin.

== Witherell Woods ==
Witherell Woods is a notable 70-acre forest stand located in Palmer Park east of the Community Building. This old-growth forest remnant dominated by oaks and American beech trees was a key reason for the park's original designation. Some of the larger trees are today over 350 years old. Three distinct natural communities are present in Palmer Park, and over 100 different species of native plants can be found, including several species of oaks, maples, and hickories; black gum, and sassafrass. The area contains both former lake bed and beach ridges of glacial Lake Maumee. Witherell Woods is currently managed by the City of Detroit and People for Palmer Park to reduce the prevalence of invasive plant species and preserve this natural wonder for generations to come.

== Handball courts ==
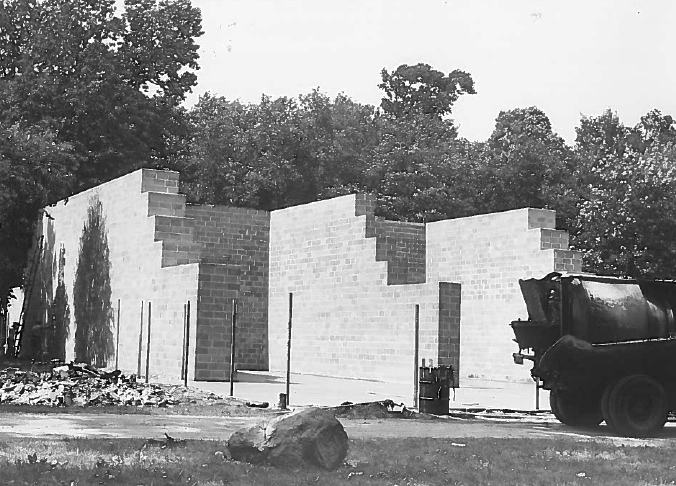
The courts during construction, 1950.

The handball courts were constructed in 1950, and were the scene of the National 3 Wall Championships between 1950 and 1972. They fell into disrepair in the 1970s, as did other areas of Palmer Park due to political, racial and financial issues of the time. Their last use was as compost bins, where the city stored wood chips and manure from the nearby Detroit Mounted Police Station in Palmer Park. During the time between 2010 and 2017, The People for Palmer Park (PFPP) recognizing the importance to the park and community, sought out a benefactor to refurbish the courts. In 2018, the Michigan Handball Association (MHA) answered that call and raised the seed funding. Play resumed in August 2018 and the courts were officially rededicated in September. Currently, the two organizations are developing resident and youth programs to introduce the game to a new generation of players.

== Old Spanish Bell ==
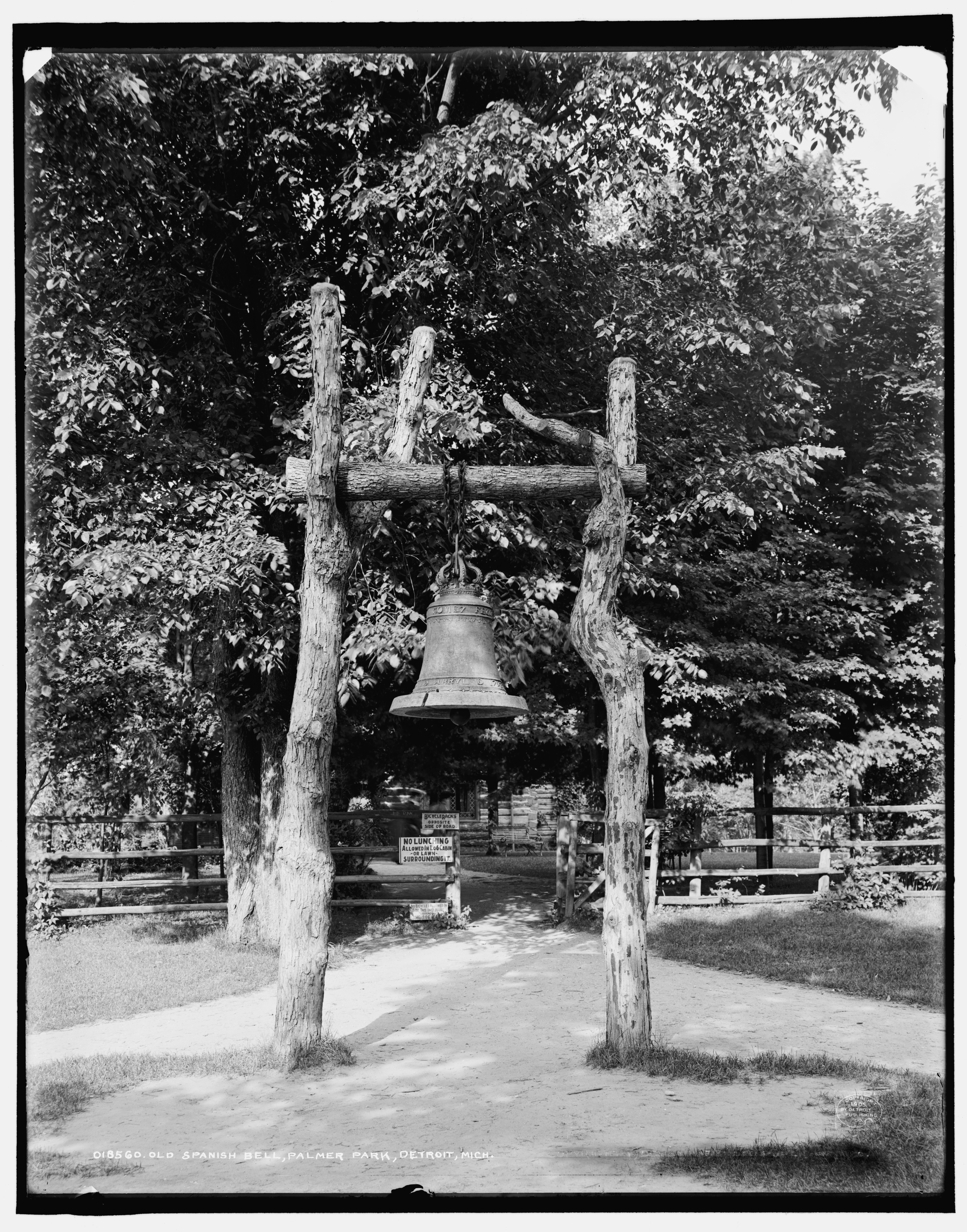
Old Spanish Bell in Palmer Park circa 1905

Near the western entrance to the Log Cabin is a large bell hanging — originally in a rustic wooden frame. This bell was designed and cast by Paula Gomez in Spain in 1793 and was taken to Mexico over 200 years ago. William A. Moore, Senator James McMillan and other friends of Senator Palmer raised funds to purchase the 1,015 pounds (460 kg) bell, as a gift, who in turn, presented it to the city.

== Palmer Park Splash Park ==
The Palmer Park Splash Park, the second splash park in Detroit, opened August 18, 2013 through a donation by Lear Corporation. The park is located just west of Woodward between Six and Seven Mile Roads, on what was once the grounds of an Olympic-size community swimming pool. It features colorful spouts that spray water from several directions. The park has motion sensors programmed to turn the water on and off when the splash park opens and closes each day.
