= Brand New Theatre =

Brand New Theatre USC
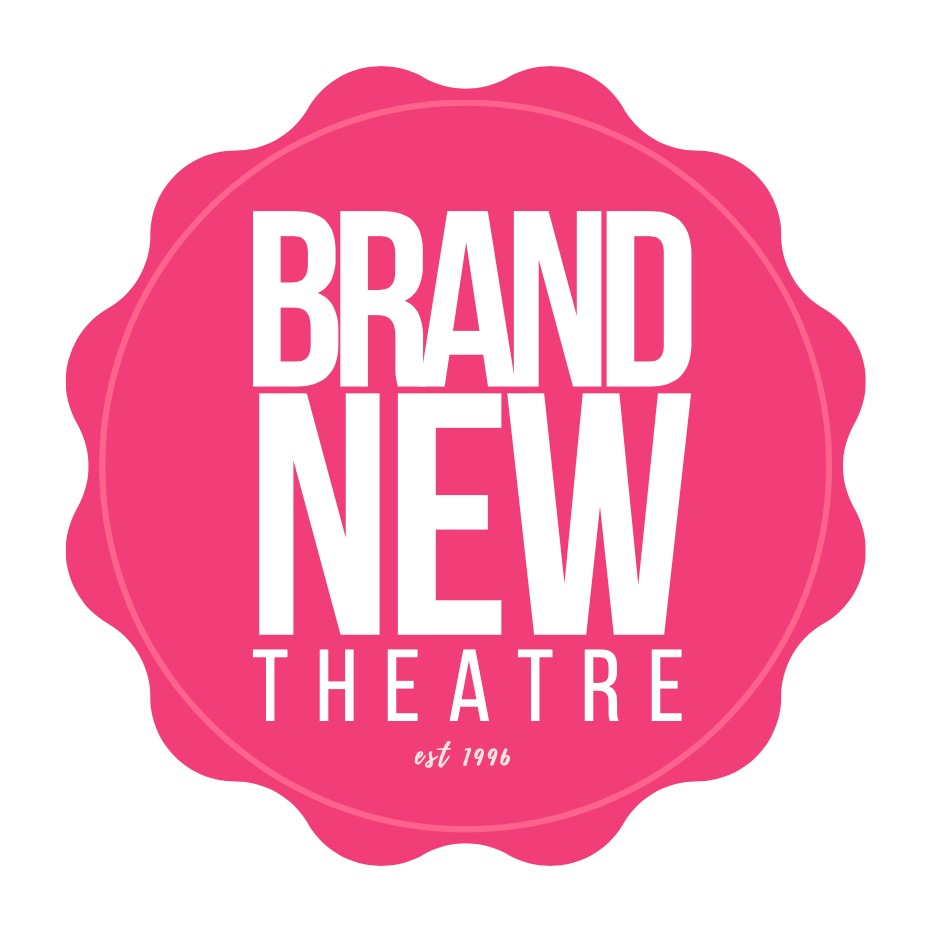
- Company: University of Southern California
- Show type: Original Work
- Location: Los Angeles, California
- Official website

Brand New Theatre USC, abbreviated BNT, is the oldest student theater company at the University of Southern California, and the only organization on campus to produce only student-written work. BNT was founded by Joe Douglass in 1996 to allow student playwrights the opportunity to see their work produced, and give student actors and directors the opportunity to shape a show in collaboration with its writer. BNT prioritizes the inclusion of undergraduate students from outside the USC School of Dramatic Arts, and USC students from widely disparate majors and departments have participated as actors, writers, directors, and producers for BNT shows. The organization's name draws from the fact that it only produces original work; every show is brand new.

== One-Act Festival ==
The productions for which they are best-known, BNT produces a series of one-acts every semester since 1996, now every fall semester since 2016. The organization curates submissions from throughout the student body, and a literary committee made up of BNT executives and student volunteers read every show and collectively select the one-acts that will together produce the strongest show; typically four are chosen. At this point, the playwrights participate in a writing workshop to finalize their scripts, and often remain involved in the drafting and production process in collaboration with their show's director and cast. In 2012, in addition to plays, the One-Act Festival included its first musical and BNT has produced several one-act musicals since.

=== List of BNT One-Act Festival Productions ===
- 2012: Musical the Musical, Caterpillar's Dilemma by Annie Jankowski, Peak by Jordan Merimee, and Biodiversity by Sarah Tither-Kaplan
- Spring 2013: Judgement by Jordan Merimee, Acid Missionary by Johnny Martin, Coming Up by Austin Welsh and Tyler Miclean, Chicken by Michael O'Konis
- Fall 2013: Open the Case by Ben Greene and Michael O'Konis, Jillian and Gunther by Daniel Evan Kaplan, Flush by Keith Boos, On the Metro by Amy Sizer
- Spring 2014: Sandbox Stories by Liz Colwell, What's the Point? by Ben Greene and Nathan Fertig, and Only the Moon Howls, by Ashley Rose Wellman, Can't Buy Me Love by Michael O'Konis, Higher Brain Function by Mia Galuppo,
- Fall 2014: Accompany (the Musical) by Alden Derck, Testing by Aaron Izek, Long Live the King by Michael O'Konis, School Day by Sam Martin, Fishing Trip by Jason Smith
- Spring 2015: Here There Be Dragons by Philip Labes, Sinclair by Ben Greene, Strange Sister by Ben Kadie, Super Guns: Maximum Fast by Roger Carnow
- Fall 2015: Eulogy by Logan Austin, Secret by Emily Cutler, Sunday Morning by Sara Swearingen, Arc by Elana Zeltser
- 2016: Internship From Hell by Sophia Pesetti, The Hamilton Family Christmas Card by Logan Austin, Please Stay by Ashley Busenlener, and Phillippe's Baguette by Miles Bryant
- 2017: Freddy & Olive by Zoe Cheng, Last Night in Town by Julia Stier, Small Talk by Charlie Junkins, Fruit Box by Savannah Harrow, Tull-Man by Dan Toomey, Two Steps Back by Anastasia Barbato
- 2018: Generaciones by Ithalia Price, Sina and the Eel by Kiki Lee, and Animals by Marissa Caddick
- 2019: Emma and Richie's Big Viking Funeral by Jacob Surovsky, Indigo Children by Aria Schuler, The importance of family, or something by Hailey Kragelj, and Reginald and Gunderson Learn to Live by Michael Warker
- 2020: Wacky Horror Cyber Show by Finn Kobler, Time Enough at Last by Daisy Tichenor, Only an Imprint by Michael Warker, and Alucard the Lonely Vampire by Michael Warker
- 2021: Stuck With You by Jade Crenian, Maxwell Grand Finale by Jennifer Velazquez, The Book of Sofia Bell by Naomi Melville, and What Can't He Fix? by Dylan Nevill
- 2022: Girls' Night by Izzy Ster, 10AM in a CRV by Eden Treiman, and They Would Live Likewise by Sydney Gamble
- 2023: Crashing by Nations and Fleeting by Andrew Bawiec
- 2024: Death Goes On A Date by Micah Owens, What Are We Waiting For? by Haley Jessica Warren, and Egg Timer by Izzy Ster

== Full-Length Show ==
In 2012, BNT produced its first full-length student-written show, and has continued to do so every spring. The process is similar to that of the one-acts: submissions are called for, and a literary committee selects a single show to be produced.

=== List of BNT Full-Length Productions ===
- 2012: Here's The Thing by Jake Minton
- 2013: Get. That. Snitch. by Achilles Capone
- 2014: Animal Stories by Molly Sharpe
- 2015: The Adventurers Club by Kyle Bellar
- 2016: Stars & Shadows by Jonathan Stoller-Schoff
- 2017: This Our Now by Olivia Cordell
- 2018: Quite Dead by Dezi Gallegos
- 2019: Welcome to Your Haven by Talitha Barkow
- 2020: The Birdcage Experiment by Aria Schuler
- 2022: The Bridge Of Birds by Eden Treiman
- 2023: Mirror by Sol Lagos
- 2025: Sea Drift by Casey Fleming

== 24-Hour Festival ==
BNT also sponsors a 24-hour theater festival every spring. From 10 pm to 10 am, individuals and teams work together to produce the script for a show or a series of shows based on a prompt. Then, from 10 am to 10 pm, the script is passed off to actors and producers, who memorize lines, block the show, acquire necessary props, costumes, and sets, and rehearse the show. At 10 pm, the curtain goes up, exactly one day after the show was first conceived.

== Writers' Workshop ==
In 2014, BNT expanded its one-acts writers workshop into an open forum that meets regularly, as a resource for student playwrights throughout USC to offer feedback and help to one another on scripts they're drafting. The workshop meets twice a month, and is not officially associated with the selection process for BNT's productions that year.

== Staged Readings ==
BNT frequently produces staged readings, selected by the BNT executive board from work submitted by members of the student body. The selection process is similar to that of the one-act and full-length productions.

=== List of BNT Staged Readings ===
- 2020: The Murders of Henry Wood by Naomi Melville
- 2023: The Embellishers by Shanley Kearney and Chutzpah by Jed Levinson
- 2025: Checkmates by Megan Dang, Corps by Delila Gonzalez, Judith Iscariot by Zachary Whalen, Mess by Ainsley Ferrell, and Something's Wrong With Todd by Alex Schwartz

== Other Productions ==
BNT's seasons have also featured productions of original work aside from one-acts festivals and full-length plays.

In 2012, BNT held a 48-Hour Festival instead of a 24-Hour Festival.

When USC's campus was closed as a result of the Covid-19 pandemic, BNT held a special edition of its annual One-Act Festival in 2020 which was streamed live to viewers. In 2021, BNT's spring full-length play was replaced by the first Drive-In Film Festival, which screened original short films created by USC students at Roadium Drive-In in Torrance, California. BNT's Summer of Love Drive-In Film Fest featured eight short films, including A Mother's Soliloquy by Cameron Kostopolous, How We Remember, Pathei Mathos, Hong Kong Boyfriend, Absorb Everything by Julia Elizabeth Evans, Rainy Days by Sophia Mazzella, Get Your Heart in the Game, and The Apple Store.

Amid a semester of construction to buildings and performance venues of the USC School of Dramatic Arts in 2024, BNT's spring full-length play was replaced by the first One-Week Theatre Fest. Inspired by the 24-Hour Festival, writers, directors, actors, and producers cultivated original plays inspired by banned children's books over the course of a single week. BNT's One-Week Theatre Fest featured three one-act plays, including Microeconomics (and other fancy economy words) by Grace Wilkerson, Under the Cork Tree by Anna DiCrisi, and An Unfortunate Waste by Isabelle Messner.

== Notable alumni ==
- Patrick J. Adams

== See also ==
- University of Southern California
- USC School of Dramatic Arts
