= Michigan Humane =

US non-profit organisation

The Michigan Humane is a private, non-profit organization providing animal welfare and sheltering services to the metropolitan Detroit area. Events at Michigan Humane are featured in the Animal Planet channel's reality television series Animal Cops: Detroit.

== Background ==
Michigan Humane is a private, non-profit organization serving the animals and people of metropolitan Detroit. Founded in 1877, it is the state of Michigan's oldest and largest animal welfare organization. In addition, it is one of the largest animal welfare organizations in the country based on the number of animals cared for and the scope of programs and services. Michigan Humane receives no government funding, is not affiliated with any national humane organization or other Michigan-based animal welfare organizations, and depends on the generosity of individual and corporate supporters to fund its programs and services.

Michigan Humane provides care for more than 100,000 animals each year in southeast Michigan. There are three centers for animal care in Detroit, Rochester Hills, Howell and Westland. Each year more than 10,000 animals are placed in homes, and more than 1500 lost animals are reunited with their guardians. The Michigan Humane Society provides a cruelty hotline staffed by professional cruelty investigators to assist animals in Detroit, Hamtramck and Highland Park 365 days a year. To reduce pet overpopulation, 13,000 surgeries are performed each year in addition to low cost sterilizations. Annually more than 20,000 children are educated, teaching them compassion, respect for animals and responsible animal care. Michigan Humane is also a driving force for greater legislative protection for animals throughout Michigan.

Michigan Humane is Michigan's largest open admission facility and will accept any animal at its three facilities, regardless of age, location, health or temperament. Animals that come to MHS are evaluated for health and temperament led by nationally renowned experts in the fields of pet behavioral science and over a dozen highly trained veterinarians, and if found to be able to be placed into a new home, will go up for adoption. MHS has no time limits or pre-determined length of stay for animals being offered for adoption.

In 2010, Michigan Humane adopted out 100 percent of all healthy animals in its three facilities, and doubled its adoption rate of treatable animals. As defined by the Asilomar Accords, whose establishment was led by Maddie's Fund to provide standardized definition and terminology of the condition of animals that come into animal care facilities, Michigan Humane had a 2010 "save rate" of 75.6 percent of animals that can be placed into homes. MHS has committed to reaching guaranteed placement of all healthy and treatable animals within the next several years.

Some critics of Michigan Humane use alternative methods to define a shelter's save rate which reject the standardized Asilomar definitions. A 2011 report by the Michigan Pet Fund claimed MHS’ save rate to be below 30 percent. In 2010, 85 percent of all animals euthanized at Michigan Humane were unhealthy or untreatable based on their medical condition or temperament as defined by the Asilomar Accords and thus could not be placed into homes.

In 2014, Michigan Humane started construction on a new and enlarged $15.5 million animal care campus on more than 4-acres, that will include a 35,000-square-foot, state-of-the-art facility, located just east of New Center, an area of Detroit, at 7887 Chrysler Drive near Clay Street. Michigan Humane said on its website that the larger facility will enable the society to expand its teaching, and training opportunities with Michigan State University's College of Veterinary Medicine.

== June 2011 Board of Directors controversy ==
In June 2011, MHS board members Cheryl Phillips and Lee Lien resigned from the board citing what they termed an "unacceptable euthanasia rate" of 70%. Phillips, who called for an independent audit of MHS' shelter practices, is quoted as saying, "What I signed on for was to protect and preserve the rights of animals. Instead of making excuses of why we kill, let's save lives."

MHS responded on their website saying that the board members had resigned over differences of opinion as to whether or not MHS should remain an open-admissions shelter. They explain their euthanasia rates as the result of their open-admission status and higher intakes of dangerous and/or ill animals than other area shelters. They did not address the question of an external audit.

== Donation bin controversy ==
In 2013, dozens of St. Vincent de Paul Donation Bins throughout metro Detroit began disappearing. "When we would go pick up the bins, they would be gone," Bill Brazier, executive director of the St. Vincent DePaul Society told WXYZ-TV. Nonprofit Planet Aid also reported missing donation bins. The missing bins were replaced with bins labeled "Michigan Humane Society". A federal lawsuit was filed in September by the Society of St. Vincent de Paul in Detroit and Planet Aid against a Texas company, American Textile Recycling Services (ATRS). The Houston-based company operates 3,615 bins nationwide, and since its inception in 2002 has paid its partners nearly $4.2 million, according to the firm. The Michigan Humane Society, based in Detroit, is one such charity partner.

== See also ==
- Animal Cops: Detroit
