= History of Detroit =

Urban growth in Detroit
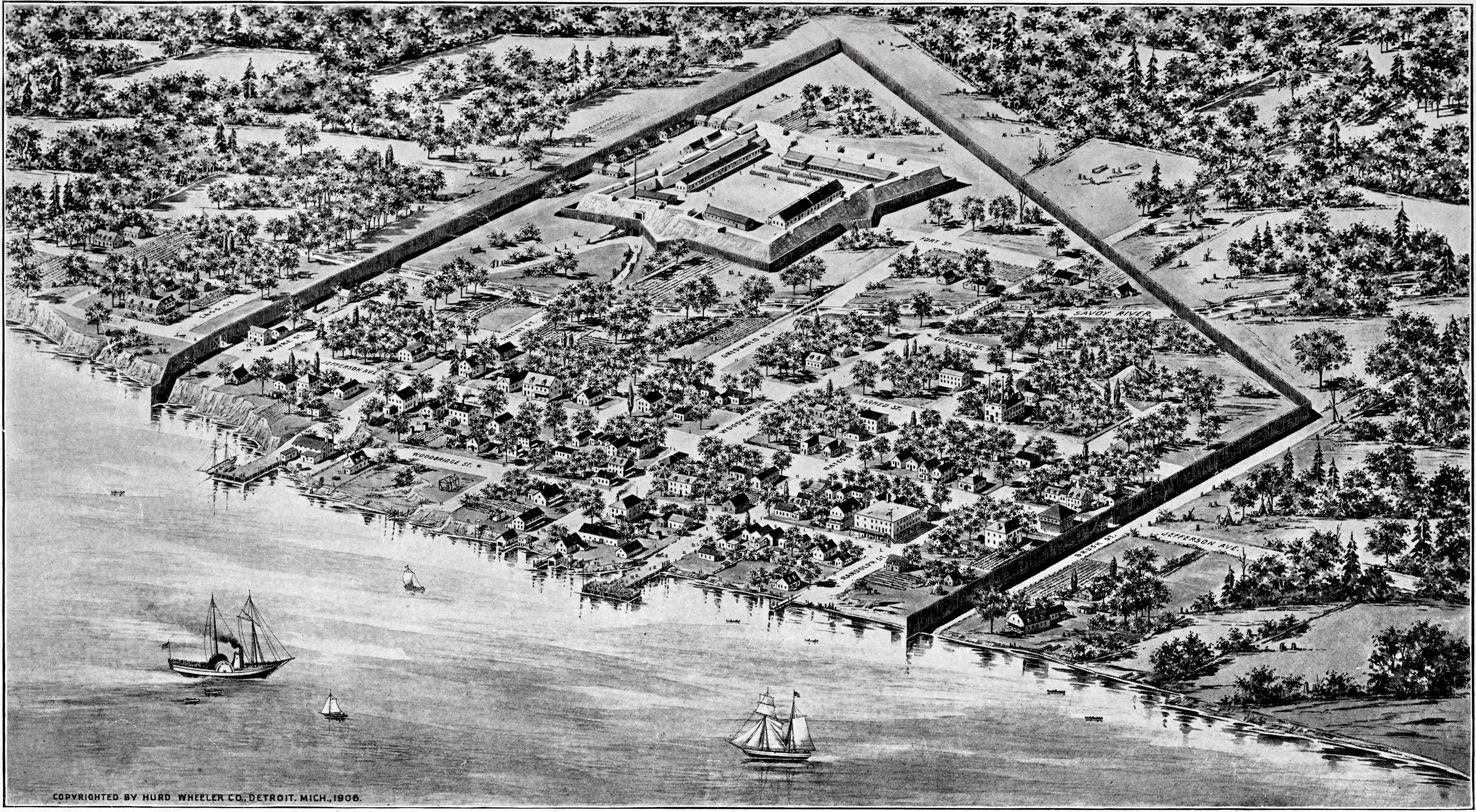
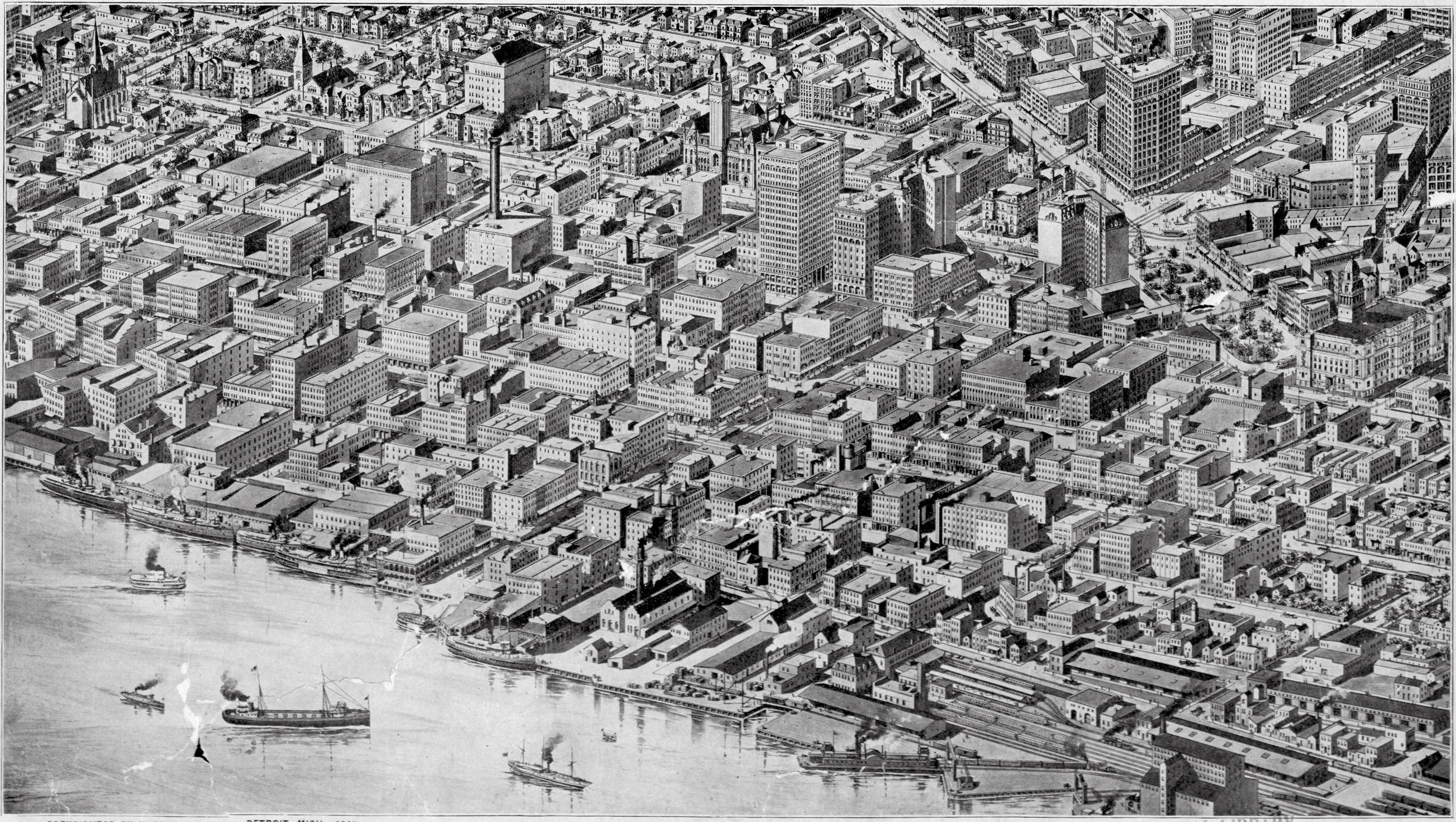
From its beginnings as Fort Detroit, downtown Detroit was a major industrial center by the early twentieth century.

Detroit, the largest city in the state of Michigan, was settled in 1701 by French colonists. It is the first European settlement above tidewater in North America. Founded as a New France fur trading post, it began to expand during the 19th century with U.S. settlement around the Great Lakes. By 1920, based on the booming auto industry and immigration, it became a world-class industrial powerhouse and the fourth-largest city in the United States. It held that standing through the mid-20th century.

The first Europeans to settle in Detroit were French country traders and colonists from Montreal and Quebec; they had to contend with the powerful Five Nations of the League of the Iroquois (Haudenosaunee), who took control of the southern shores of Lakes Erie and Huron through the Beaver Wars of the 17th century. Also present and powerful, but further to the north, were the Council of Three Fires (Anishinaabe). (in Anishinaabe: Niswi-mishkodewinan, also known as the People of the Three Fires; the Three Fires Confederacy; or the United Nations of Chippewa, Ottawa, and Potawatomi Indians) is a long-standing Anishinaabe alliance of the Ojibwe (or Chippewa), Odawa (or Ottawa), and Potawatomi North American Native tribes. The Three Fires Confederacy (Anishinaabe) were often supported by the French, while the so-called League of Iroquois, or Five Nations (Haudenosaunee) was supported by the English and Dutch.

Immigration grew initially for the lucrative inland and Great Lakes connected fur trade, based on continuing relations with influential Native American chiefs and interpreters. The Crown's administration of New France offered free land to colonists to attract families to the region of Detroit. The population grew steadily, but more slowly than in the English private venture-funded Thirteen Colonies based on the Atlantic coast. The French had a smaller population base and attracted fewer families. During the French and Indian War (1756–1763), the French reinforced and improved Fort Detroit (which had been constructed in 1701) along the Detroit River between 1758 and 1760. It was subject to repeated attacks by British and colonial forces combined with their Indian allies.

Fort Detroit was surrendered to the British on November 29, 1760, after the fall of Quebec. Control of the area, and all French territory east of the Mississippi River, were formally transferred to Great Britain by the Treaty of Paris after the British defeated France in the Seven Years' War. The official census counted 2,000 people in Detroit in 1760, which dropped to 1,400 by 1773 due to the unattractiveness of living in the fledgling settlement. The city was in territory which the British restricted the colonists from settling in under Royal Proclamation of 1763. It was transferred to Quebec under the Quebec Act of 1774. By 1778 in a census taken during the American Revolution, population was up to 2,144. It was then the third-largest city in the Province of Quebec, after Montreal and Quebec.

After 1773 a steady but growing trickle of European-American settlers took families across the barrier range, or through lower New York State into the Ohio Country—gradually spreading across present-day Ohio along the south shore of Lake Erie and around the bottom of Lake Huron. After the 1778 Sullivan Expedition broke the power of the Iroquois, the New York corridor joined the gaps of the Allegheny, Cumberland Narrows and Cumberland Gap as mountain passes, enabling settlers to pour west into the mid-west, even as the American Revolution wound down.

After the peace, a flood of settlers continued west, and Detroit reaped its share of population, established itself as a gateway to the west and the Great Lakes, and for a time outshone all other cities west of the mountains, save for New Orleans.

During the 19th century, Detroit grew into a thriving hub of commerce and industry. The city expanded along Jefferson Avenue, with multiple manufacturing firms taking advantage of the transportation resources afforded by the river and a parallel rail line. Throughout the 20th century, various skyscrapers were built centered on Detroit's downtown.

Following World War II, the auto industry boomed and suburban expansion took place. The Detroit metropolitan area developed as one of the larger geographic areas of the United States. Immigrants and migrants have contributed significantly to Detroit's economy and culture. Later in the century, industrial restructuring and trouble in the auto industry led to a dramatic decline in jobs and population. Since the 1990s, the city has gained increased revitalization. Many areas of the city are listed in the National Register of Historic Places and include National Historic Landmarks.

== Native American history ==
Hearths and geological features from the Holcombe beach site near Lake Saint Clair show that Paleo-Indian people settled in the area of Detroit as early as 11,000 years ago. Mound Builders lived in the area, the largest mound in the area was The Great Mound of the River Rouge, as well as and Springwells and the Fort Wayne Mound Site. Cone-shaped mounds were built for burial, ceremonial, and defense purposes. The large mound at River Rouge was found to have had very old human bones, arrow heads, chisels, axels, and pottery. The Mound Builders were ancestors to later Native American tribes.

In the 17th century, the region was inhabited by the Huron, Odawa, Potawatomi and western nations of the Iroquois League. The first Europeans did not penetrate into the region and reach the straits of Detroit until French missionaries and traders worked their way around the Iroquois, with whom they were at war in the 1630s. In the late 1600s, raids led by the Five Nations of the Iroquois throughout the region drove out competing native peoples in order to control the fur trade. The French found their permanent villages to be abandoned when they decided to build a fort on the northern bank of the Detroit River.

== Early French settlement ==
The first recorded mention of the site was in the 1670s, when French missionaries found a stone idol venerated by the Native Americans there and destroyed it with an axe. Early settlers planted twelve missionary pear trees "named for the twelve Apostles" on the grounds of what is now Waterworks Park.

The city name comes from the Detroit River (French: le détroit du Lac Érie), meaning the strait of Lake Erie, linking Lake Huron and Lake Erie; in the historical context, the strait included Lake St. Clair and the St. Clair River. The sieur de Cadillac in 1698 proposed to his government in Paris that Detroit be established as a shelter for displaced Native American allies. Paris approved and in 1701, Cadillac with his lieutenant Alphonse de Tonty, led a party of 100 Frenchmen to establish a post called Fort Pontchartrain du Détroit, naming it after his sponsor the comte de Pontchartrain, Minister of Marine under Louis XIV. In 1704, he was given ownership over the strenuous opposition of officials in New France. An investigation by de Pontchartrain showed Cadillac was a tyrannical profiteer whose mischief hurt the French cause, so Cadillac was removed and sent to faraway New Orleans as governor of Louisiana.

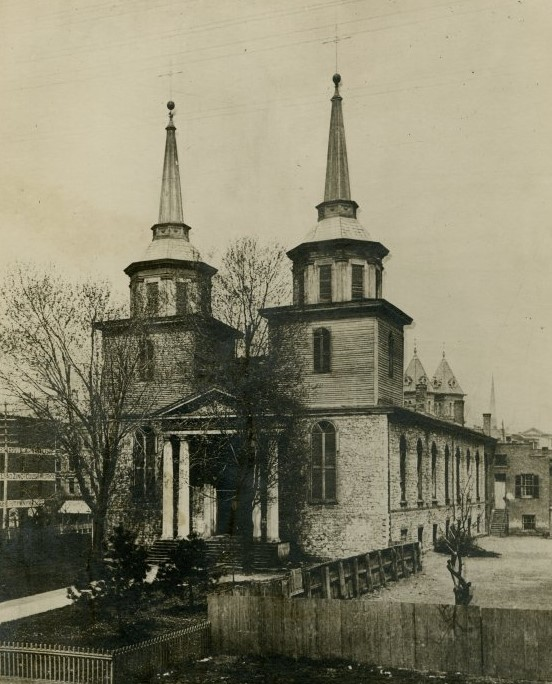
Ste. Anne de Détroit (Old Sainte Anne de Détroit), founded in 1701, is the second-oldest continuously operating Roman Catholic parish in the United States. Ste. Anne's original "stone church", as seen in this 1840s-era photograph, was built in 1818. The present Gothic Revival-styled church was completed in 1887. Today its parish is largely ethnic Hispanic.

Ste. Anne de Détroit, founded 1701, is the second oldest continuously operating Catholic parish in the United States; it was the first building erected in Detroit.

The main business was trading furs with the Native Americans, using goods supplied from Montreal. It was the largest French village between Montreal and New Orleans. Native American villages of rival tribes grew up near the fort which led to the Fox Wars in the early 1700s.

=== French and Indian War ===
During the French and Indian War (1753–63)—the North American front of the Seven Years' War in Europe between the Kingdom of Great Britain and the Kingdom of France— the besieged François-Marie Picoté de Belestre, the last French commander at Fort Detroit (1758–1760), surrendered on November 29, 1760, to the British Army. The British subsequently shortened the name of the settlement to just Detroit.

== British rule ==
Several regional Native American tribes, such as the Potowatomi, Ojibwe and Huron, launched Pontiac's War (1763–1766), and laid siege in 1763 to Fort Detroit along the Detroit River in the Great Lakes but failed to capture it. After their defeat in the Seven Years’ War, France ceded its territory in North America of New France and south of the lakes east of the Mississippi to the Appalachian Mountains to Britain. Control of the area was formally transferred to the British by the 1763 Treaty of Paris. New France was renamed Quebec. Grants of free land attracted families to Detroit, which grew to 800 people in 1765.

After Great Britain evicted France from its colonial possessions in New France (Canada) in the peace terms of the Treaty of Paris of 1763, it also removed one barrier to American colonists migrating west across the mountains. British negotiations with the Iroquois would both prove critical and lead to the Royal Proclamation of 1763, which limited settlements South of and below the Great Lakes and west of the Alleghenies / Appalachians. Many colonists and pioneers in the Thirteen Colonies along the East Coast, resented and then simply defied this restraint, later becoming supporters of the rebellious American Revolution. By 1773, after the addition of increasing numbers of the Anglo-American settlers, the population of Detroit and Fort Detroit, was edging up to 1,400 (doubled in the previous decade). During the American Revolutionary War (1775–1783), the indigenous and loyalist raids of 1778 and the resultant 1779 decisive Sullivan Expedition reopened the Ohio Country (north of the Ohio River and west of the mountains) to even more westward emigration, which began almost immediately to get away from the eastern warfare. By 1778, its population had doubled again, reaching 2,144 and it was the third-largest town in what was known then as the Province of Quebec since the British takeover of former French colonial possessions in North America in 1763.

=== Slavery in colonial Detroit ===
In the city's earliest years, before the American era, slavery was practiced in Detroit. Many notable British and French residents of Detroit were known slaveholders.

After the Americans took control of the colony and Michigan became a free territory, slavery and the slave trade were prohibited. However, Territorial Chief Justice Augustus B. Woodward ruled in the 1807 case Denison v. Tucker that individuals enslaved before Michigan came under American control would remain enslaved for life. This ruling forced the Denison family to flee to Canada.

== Early American control ==
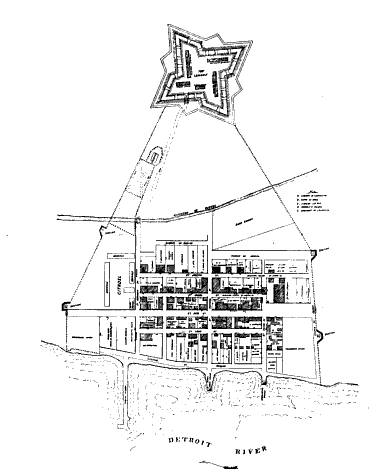
Plan of the Town of Detroit and Fort Lernoult, 1792.

Detroit was the goal of various American campaigns during the Revolutionary War, but logistical difficulties in the American frontier and American Indian allies of Great Britain would keep any armed Patriot force from reaching the Detroit area. In the 1783 Treaty of Paris, Great Britain ceded territory that included Detroit to the newly recognized United States, though in reality it remained under British control. Under the peace of the terms of the 1783 Treaty of Paris. The new Northwest Territories established the southern border with Great Britain's remaining colonial provinces in British North America and became provinces of Upper Canada and Lower Canada. Great Britain continued to trade with and defend her native allies in the area, and supplied local nations with weapons and supplies to raid American settlers and soldiers. However, the disputed border area remained under British control with several military forts and trading posts for another decade, and its forces did not fully withdraw until 1796, directly following the negotiations and ratification of the subsequent Jay Treaty of 1794 between the British and Americans.. In 1794, a Native American alliance, that had received some support and encouragement from the British, was decisively defeated by General Anthony Wayne at the Battle of Fallen Timbers near Toledo, Ohio. Wayne negotiated the Treaty of Greenville (1795) with many of these nations, in which tribes ceded the area of Fort Detroit to the United States.

Detroit was incorporated as a town by the legislature of the Northwest Territory at Chillicothe, Ohio, on January 18, 1802, effective February 1, 1802. Government was administered by a five-person board of trustees and there was no office of mayor. Following this, Ohio became a state and the eastern half of Michigan was attached to the Indiana Territory.

=== Great Fire of 1805 ===
Before the new territorial government officially began, a fire destroyed nearly all of Detroit on June 11, 1805. The Michigan Territory was established effective June 30, 1805, as a separate territory with Detroit as the capital. The territorial government convinced the U.S. Congress to pass an act on April 21, 1806, which authorized them to lay out a town that included all of the old town of Detroit plus an additional 10,000 acres (40 km^{2}) to be used as compensation for persons who lost their house in the fire.

Following the fire, Father Gabriel Richard was involved in the redesign of Detroit and, in 1808, proposed the establishment of the Catholepistemiad. Now known as the University of Michigan, it is the oldest university in the state. The city's motto, Speramus meliora; resurget cineribus ('We hope for better things; it will rise from the ashes'), was written by him after the fire.

=== City incorporation ===
On September 13, 1806, the territorial government passed an act incorporating the new city of Detroit. The governor appointed Solomon Sibley as mayor. Shortly afterward, Sibley resigned and Elijah Brush was appointed in his stead. The mayor was appointed by the governor and, under the act of incorporation, was able to disapprove legislation passed by the popularly elected council without any recourse for overriding the mayor. Because of this, many felt that the real aim of the governor in incorporating the city was to remove the popularly elected town officers and exert a more direct influence over governance of the city. This form of government was extremely unpopular, and was repealed on February 4, 1809. However, to prevent resurrection of the popularly elected town government, on September 16, 1810, an act passed repealing all laws pertaining to Michigan that had been passed by the Legislature of the Northwest Territory. This effectively eradicated any trace of legitimacy for the former popularly elected town government.

=== War of 1812 ===
In the War of 1812, Governor Hull surrendered Detroit to a smaller British force supported by a larger force of Native American allies commanded by Tecumseh. The British commander, Isaac Brock, had bluffed the Americans into believing there were thousands of Native American warriors accompanying him. Tecumseh marched his native troops through a clearing and then circled the same troops through the clearing again to make it seem there was a much larger native force. Governor William Hull was convicted of cowardice and sentenced to death by a court martial, but received a presidential pardon. Augustus Woodward remained as Chief Justice of the Territory until he was removed by British authorities. The U.S. Army recaptured Detroit in 1813 after the British abandoned it and used it as a base to invade Canada and permanently end the threat of Native American raids on American settlements. After the British abandoned Detroit, American forces caught up to the retreating British-Indian force, and decisively defeated them. Lewis Cass, as territorial governor, on October 24, 1815, restored control of local affairs to the people of Detroit, with the election of a five-person board of trustees and enactment of a charter for the city of Detroit.

== A city emerges ==
Government under the board of trustees continued until an act of the Territorial Legislature on August 5, 1824, created a Common Council of the City of Detroit. The Council consisted of five aldermen, the mayor, and the recorder. In an act of April 4, 1827, the number of aldermen increased to seven. In 1839, it increased to 14: two aldermen from six wards plus the mayor and recorder. A seventh ward was created in 1848, an eighth in 1849, and the ninth and tenth wards in 1857. Also in 1857, a new city charter provided that the mayor and recorder would no longer sit as members of the council. At this time, the council consisted of 20 members, two aldermen from ten wards. In 1873, a twelfth ward was added and aldermen from an illegally constituted eleventh ward also temporarily sat on the council. In 1875, a properly constituted eleventh ward and a thirteenth ward were added. The city charter of 1883 changed the name of the body to the Board of Aldermen. A few years earlier in 1881, a separately elected ten-person body named Board of Councilmen (also called the City Council), was established. This body was abolished in 1887.

After Detroit rebuilt in the early 19th century, a thriving community soon sprang up, and by the Civil War, over 45,000 people were living in the city, primarily spread along Jefferson Avenue to the east and Fort Street to the west. As in many major American cities, subsequent redevelopment of the central city through the next 150 years has eliminated all but a handful of the antebellum structures in Detroit. The oldest remaining structures are those built as private residences, including a group in the Corktown neighborhood and another set of houses strung along Jefferson Avenue—notably the Charles Trowbridge House (1826), (the oldest known structure in the city), the Joseph Campau House (1835), the Sibley House (1848), the Beaubien House (1851), and the Moross House (1855). Other extant pre-1860 structures include Fort Wayne (1849); Saints Peter and Paul Church (1848) and Mariner's Church (1849); and early commercial buildings such as those in the Randolph Street Commercial Buildings Historic District, for example.

The main communication medium from the 1830s until the rise of television in the 1950s was the newspaper. Detroit had a large variety of daily papers, meeting the needs of the political parties have different language groups in the city, as well as the needs of readers concerned with news of business, labor, agriculture, literature, local churches, and polite society.

=== Civil War era ===
Prior to the American Civil War, the city's access to the Canada–US border made it a key stop for runaway slaves along the Underground Railroad. The Michigan Soldiers' and Sailors' Monument in Detroit's Campus Martius Park commemorates the state's role in the American Civil War. Thousands of Detroiters formed volunteer regiments, including the 24th Michigan Volunteer Infantry Regiment (part of the legendary Iron Brigade) which fought with distinction and suffered 82% casualties at Gettysburg in 1863. Abraham Lincoln is quoted as saying Thank God for Michigan! Following Lincoln's assassination, General George Armstrong Custer delivered a eulogy to the thousands gathered near Campus Martius Park. Custer led the Michigan Brigade during the American Civil War and called them the Wolverines.

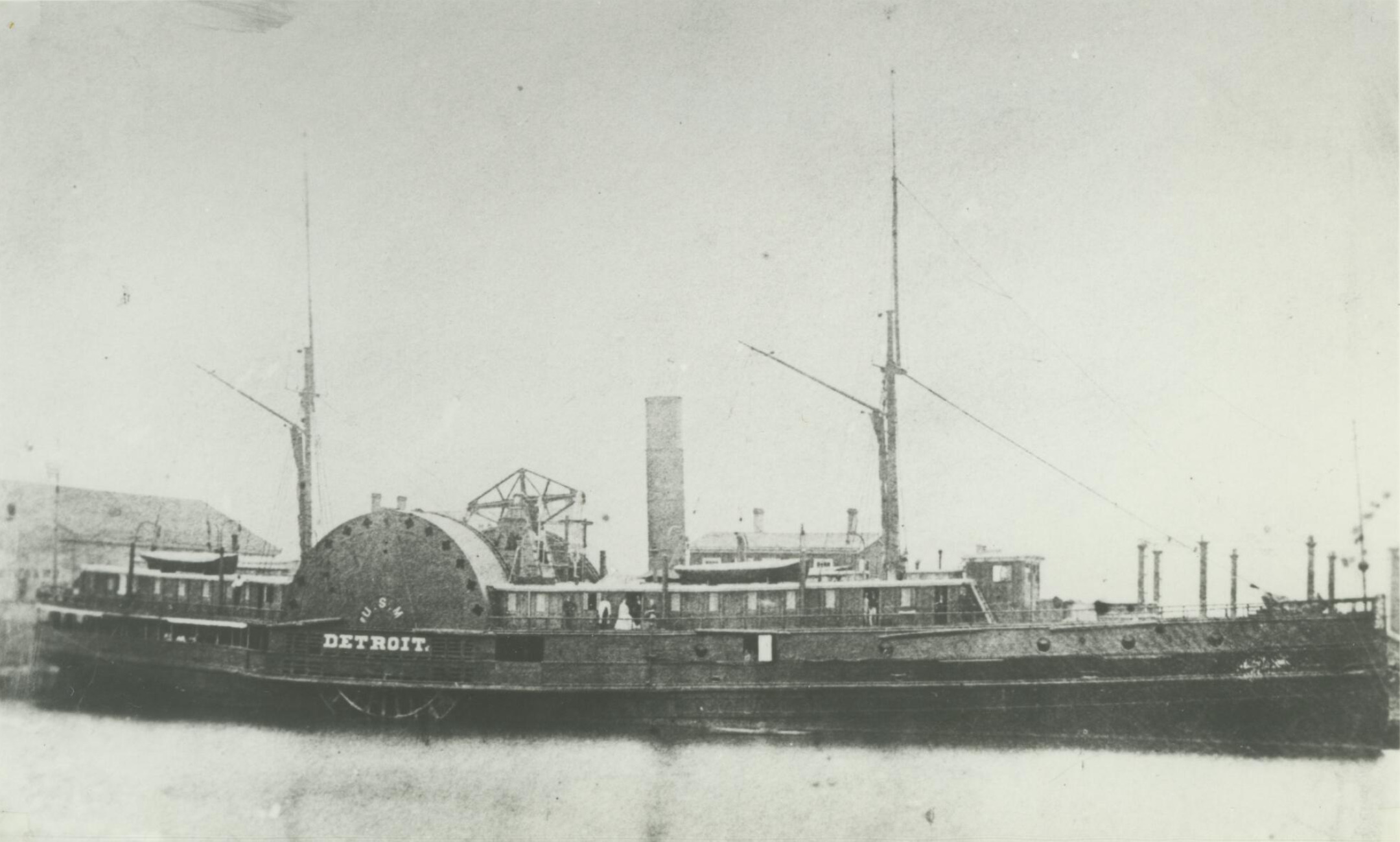
The steamer Detroit, before 1872

The Detroit race riot of 1863 occurred on March 6, 1863, and was the city's first such incident, as Irish and German Catholics resisted the mandatory draft laws. At the time, it was reported as "the bloodiest day that ever dawned upon Detroit". The casualties of the day included at least two people dead, and many others injured, mostly African-American, 35 buildings were burned to the ground, and a number of other buildings were damaged by fire.

=== Rise of industry and commerce ===
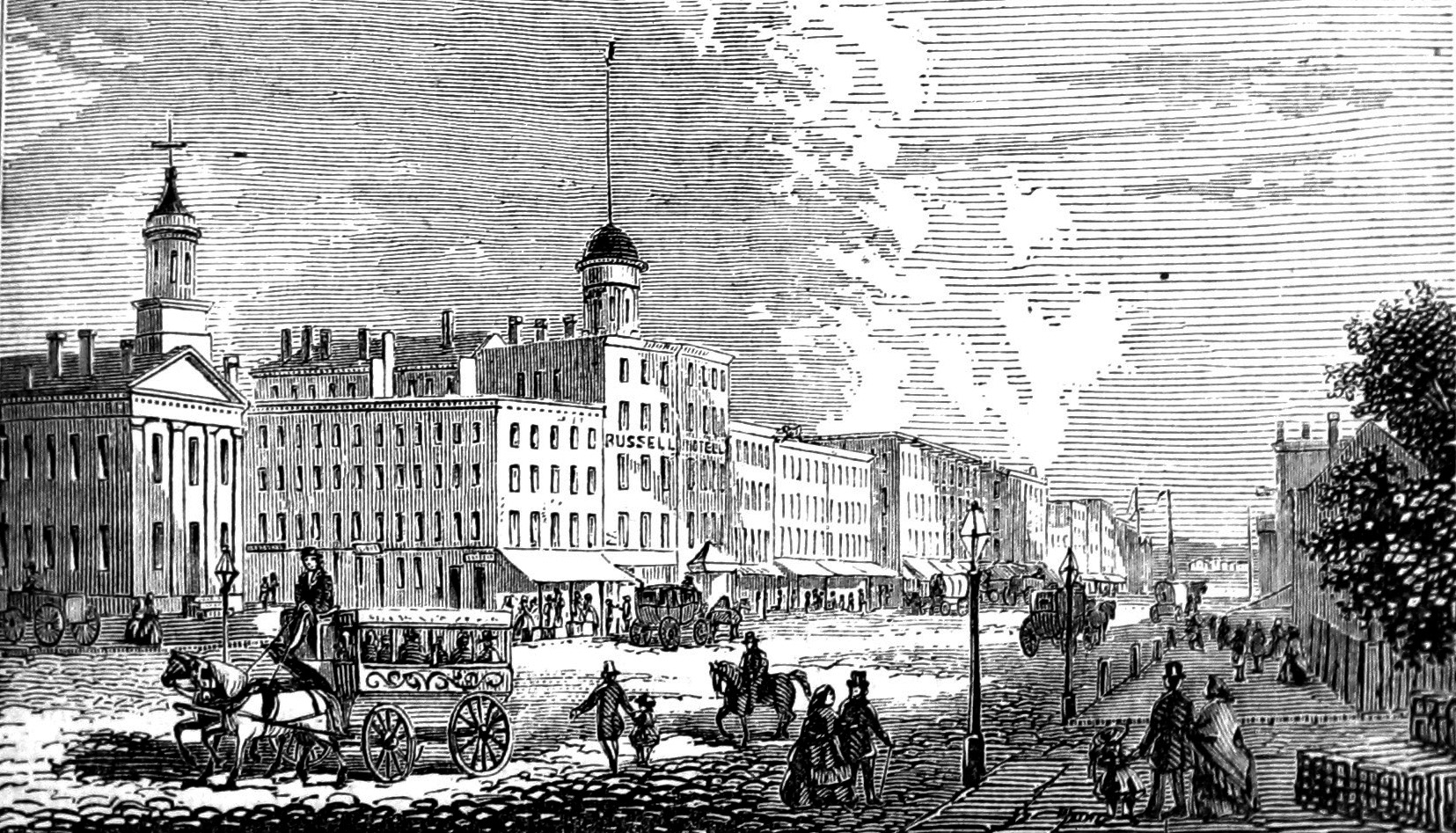
Woodward Avenue in 1865.

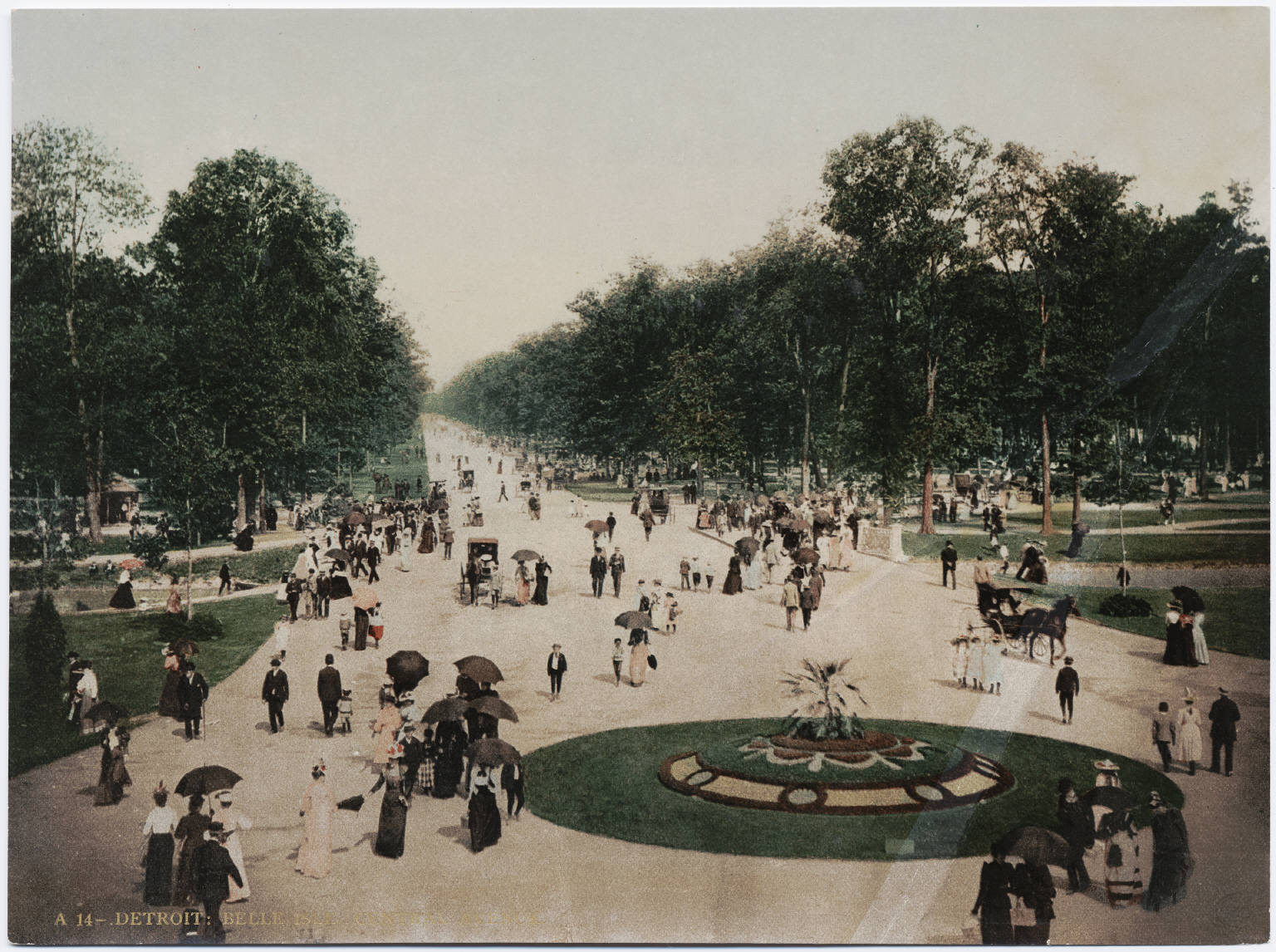
Belle Isle, circa 1897–1924

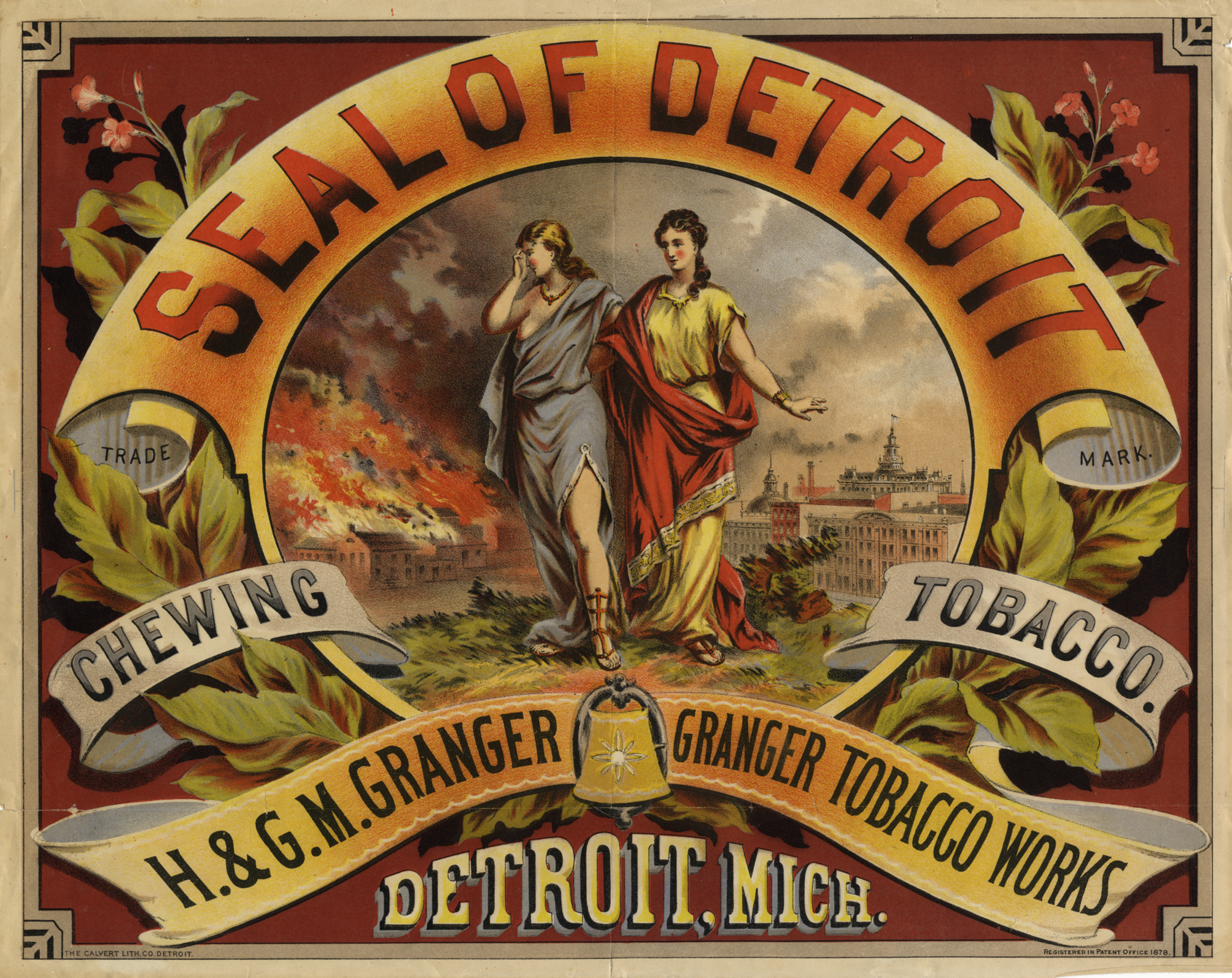
1878 tobacco advertisement featuring the city seal of Detroit

Detroit's central location in the Great Lakes Region has contributed to its status as a major center for commerce and global trade. As Detroit grew, it emerged as a U.S. transportation hub linking the Great Lakes system of waterways to the Erie Canal and to rail lines. Pharmaceutical firms such as Parke-Davis in the 1870s and the Frederick Stearns Company in the 1890s established centers between East Jefferson Avenue. Globe Tobacco built a manufacturing facility closer to downtown in 1888. During the late 19th century, cast-iron stove manufacturing became Detroit's top industry; by the 1890s, the city became known as the "Stove Capital of the World".

The rise of manufacturing led to a new class of wealthy industrialists, entrepreneurs, and professionals. Some of these nouveau riche built along East Jefferson, resulting in structures such as the Thomas A. Parker House (1868), the Croul-Palms House (1881), the William H. Wells House (1889), the John N. Bagley House (1889), and the Frederick K. Stearns House (1902).

Detroit began increasingly to expand, and other citizens pushed north of downtown, building houses along Woodward in what was at the time a quiet residential area. The city has many restored historic Victorian structures, notably those in the Brush Park and East Ferry Avenue historic districts. The Elisha Taylor House (1870) and the Hudson–Evans House (1872) are both in Brush Park; the Col. Frank J. Hecker House (1888) and the Charles Lang Freer House (1887) are in the East Ferry Avenue neighborhood. Near the end of the 19th century, apartment living became more acceptable for affluent middle-class families, and upscale apartments, such as the Coronado Apartments (1894), the Verona Apartments (1894), the Palms Apartments (1903), the Davenport Apartments (1905) in the Cass-Davenport Historic District, and the Garden Court Apartments (1915) were constructed to meet the new demand.

These well-to-do late-19th-century residents also funded the construction of a spate of churches, such as the Cass Avenue Methodist Episcopal Church (1883), the First Presbyterian Church (1889), the Trinity Episcopal Church (1890) (built by James E. Scripps), and the First Unitarian Church (1890).

=== Immigrants in the 19th century ===
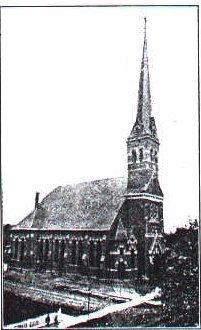
St. Boniface, 1910

Detroit has long been a city of immigrants, from the early French settlers in the 17th and 18th century, through the Irish emigrants who settled in the Corktown neighborhood in the 1840s, and the Germans who comprised the largest group. Significant contingents during this period included German and Polish immigrants who settled in Detroit in the 1860-1890s.

Conditions were especially favorable for the Irish Catholics. Vinyard finds that they enjoyed many opportunities and suffered "negligible religious prejudice". They were especially successful in politics, government service, dockyard and construction jobs, and built numerous churches. They funded the migration of relatives from Ireland. They took very active leadership roles in the Democratic Party and labor unions

European immigrants opened businesses and established communities. German immigrants established German-speaking churches, primarily on the east side of the city, including Saint John's-St. Luke's Evangelical Church (1872), St. Joseph Catholic Church (1873), and Sacred Heart Church (1875), as well as social clubs such as the Harmonie Club (1894) and west-side churches such as St. Boniface (1882) and Gethsemane Evangelical Lutheran Church (1891).

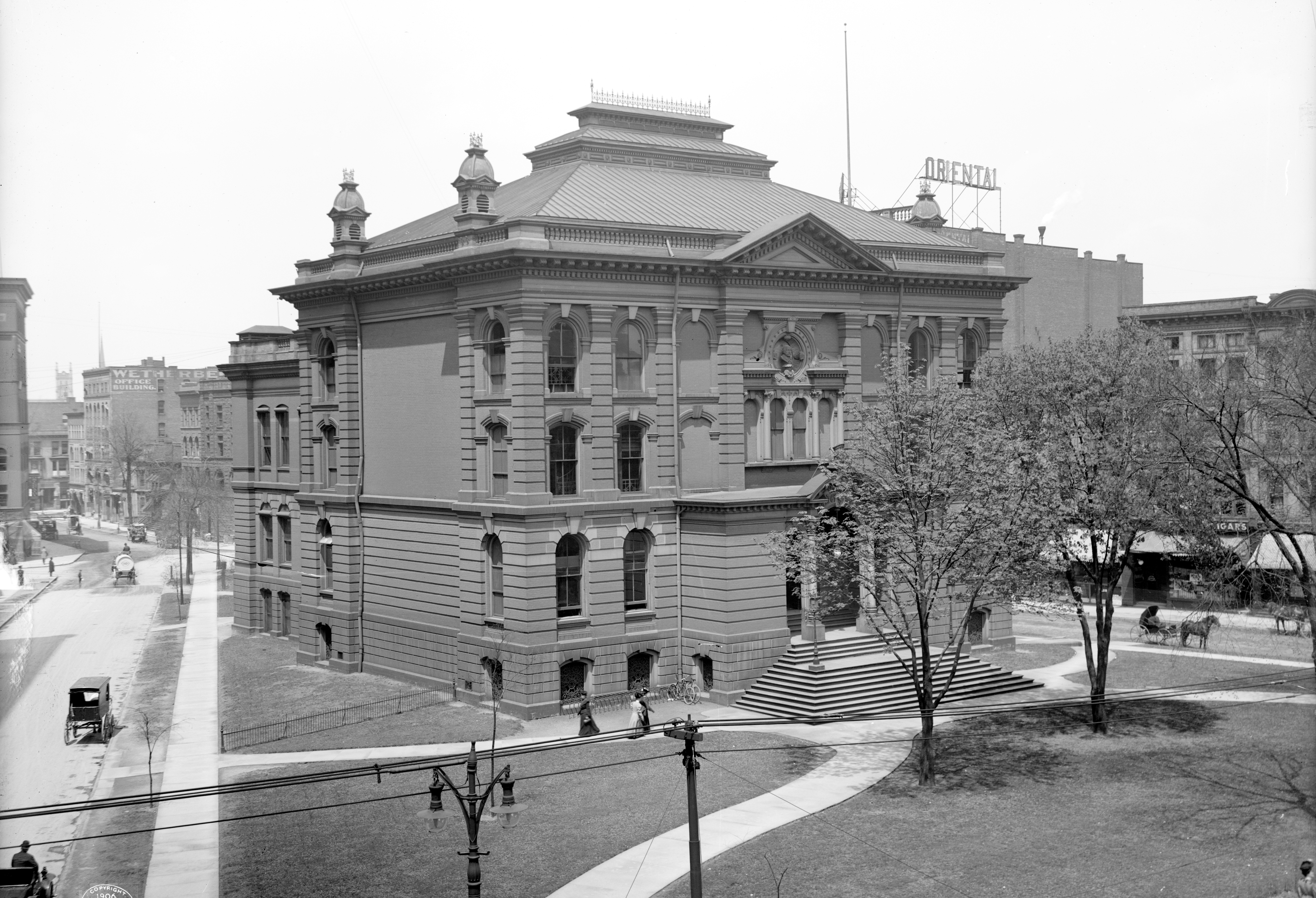
Detroit Centre Park Library, constructed in 1872

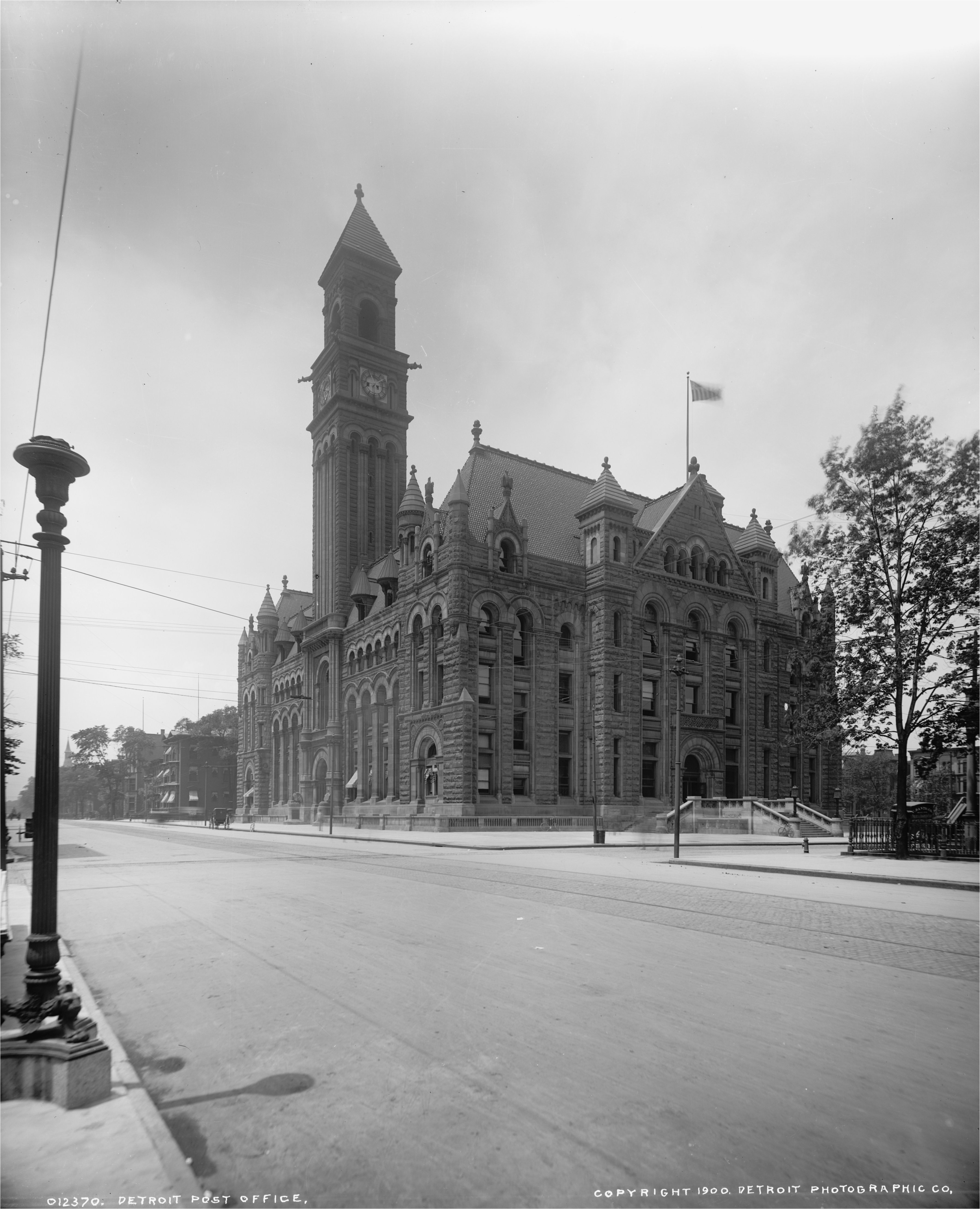
Detroit Post Office, built in 1891

Close behind, a wave of Polish immigrants established east-side Roman Catholic parishes such as St. Albertus (1885), Sweetest Heart Of Mary (1893), St. Josaphat's (1901), St. Stanislaus (1911), and St. Thomas the Apostle Catholic Church (1923). The Poles also settled on the west side, founding West Side Dom Polski (1916). The son of Prussian Polish immigrants, Rev. John A. Lemke, born in Detroit on February 10, 1866, was the first American-born Roman Catholic priest of Polish descent to be ordained in America. He was baptized at St. Mary Roman Catholic Church (1843), at the corner of St. Antoine and Croghan (Monroe), on February 18, 1866, attended St. Albertus for his primary education, and studied at Detroit College which is now the University of Detroit Mercy where he received a bachelor's degree in 1884; then, after attending St. Mary's in Baltimore, he completed his theological studies at St. Francis Seminary in Monroe, Michigan, and he was ordained by the Bishop John Samuel Foley in 1889. The Catholics were especially energetic in building churches, schools, orphanages, hospitals and other charitable institutions.

Nearly nine out of ten Detroiters in 1900 (87%) lived in single-family homes. European immigrants including German, Belgian, Polish, and Irish ethnics were likely to be home owners in the city. Most immigrants built their own home with the aid of their neighbors, or if still saving the purchase price they rented from fellow ethnics. They used an informal, localized, ethnically controlled housing market that was quite distinct from the professionally operated housing market. Homeownership in Detroit surged in the city's immigrant neighborhoods by 1900.

=== Hazen Pingree ===
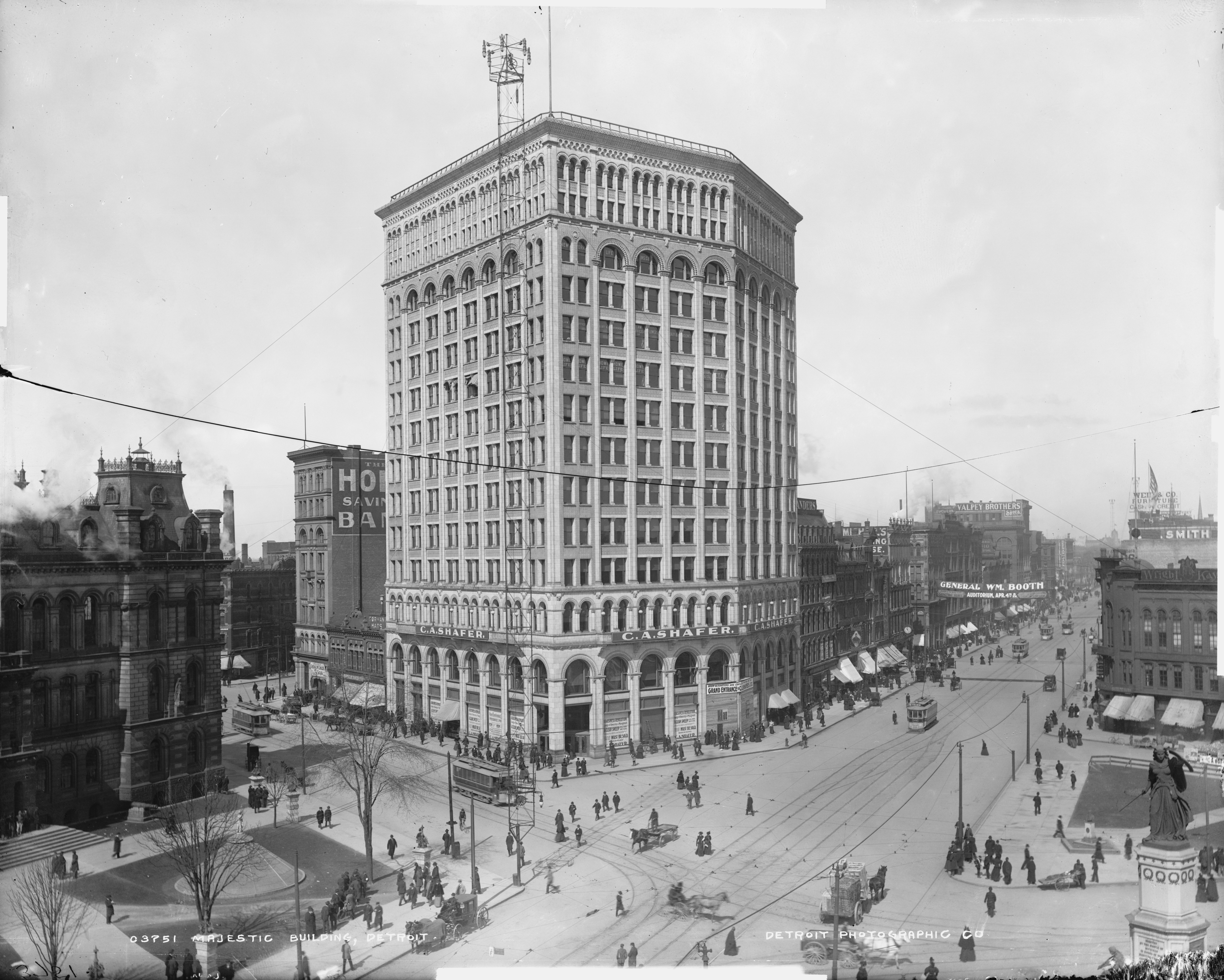
The Majestic Building, constructed in 1896, was the city's second skyscraper, following the completion of the Hammond Building.

In 1887, John Pridgeon Jr., a Democrat, was elected mayor in a landslide after his Republican opponent endorsed prohibition in the heavily German city. Pridgeon's term was besmirched by multiple scandals involving the Common Council, city commissioners, grand jury investigations, and multiple indictments for bribery and graft. In 1889, Republicans recouped and called for "good government" by nominating a businessman with no political experience, Hazen S. Pingree after a colorful campaign in which Pingree revealed his tolerance by making a circuit of saloons. One of his early projects was simply paving the streets—only four streets were paved, and The Detroit Journal described the rest as "150 miles of rotting, rutted, lumpy, dilapidated paving". In hot weather some stretches oozed pitch and resin and occasionally caught fire from discarded cigar butts. Warning repeatedly against the dangers of government by the corporations, he launched nationally visible crusades against Detroit's streetcar, gas, electric, and telephone companies. He successfully forced rate reductions that won him widespread popularity. He won public approval for a citizen-owned electric light plant, and became a national spokesman for municipal ownership and close regulation of utilities and street railways. When the nationwide Panic of 1893 pushed the nation into a deep depression (1893–97), he won approval by opening empty lots to garden farming – people called them "Pingree's potato patches". He was a steadfast Republican, and had nothing to do with the Populist Party that had considerable support among labor union members. Pingree added to the old stock Yankee Republican base by making large inroads into the German, Polish and Canadian elements. He was reelected in 1891, 1893 and 1895. Pingree was one of the most influential American mayors in the 1890s – historians now rated him number 4 among all American mayors, and see him as one of the early leaders of the Progressive Era. He supported the gold standard in 1896, and worked hard to carry the city and state for William McKinley over silverite William Jennings Bryan in the intensely competitive 1896 presidential election. McKinley carried the city and state and Pingree was elected governor of Michigan.

== 20th century ==
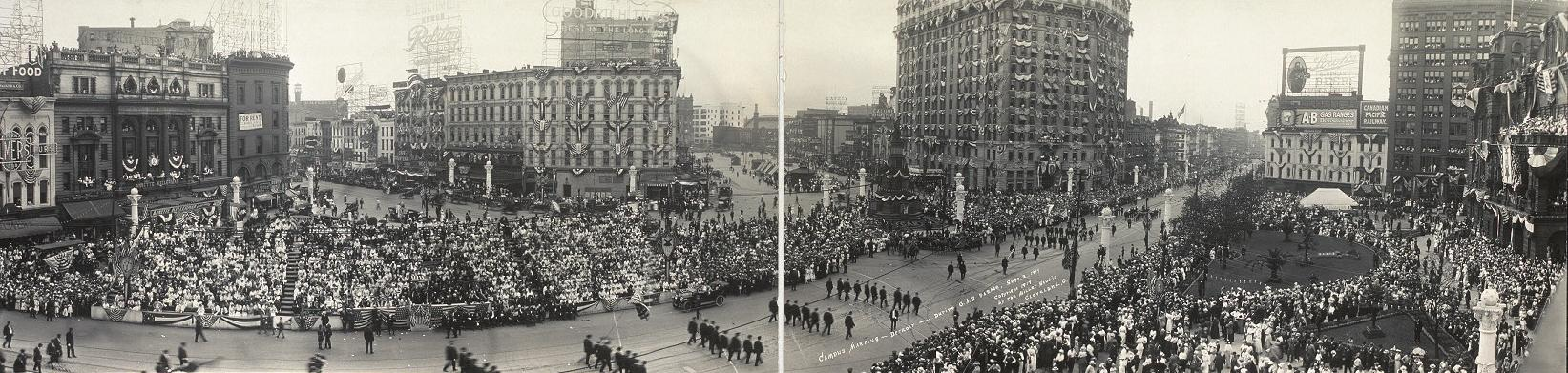
Parade of the Grand Army of the Republic during the 1914 meeting in Detroit, Michigan

=== Henry Ford and the automobile industry ===
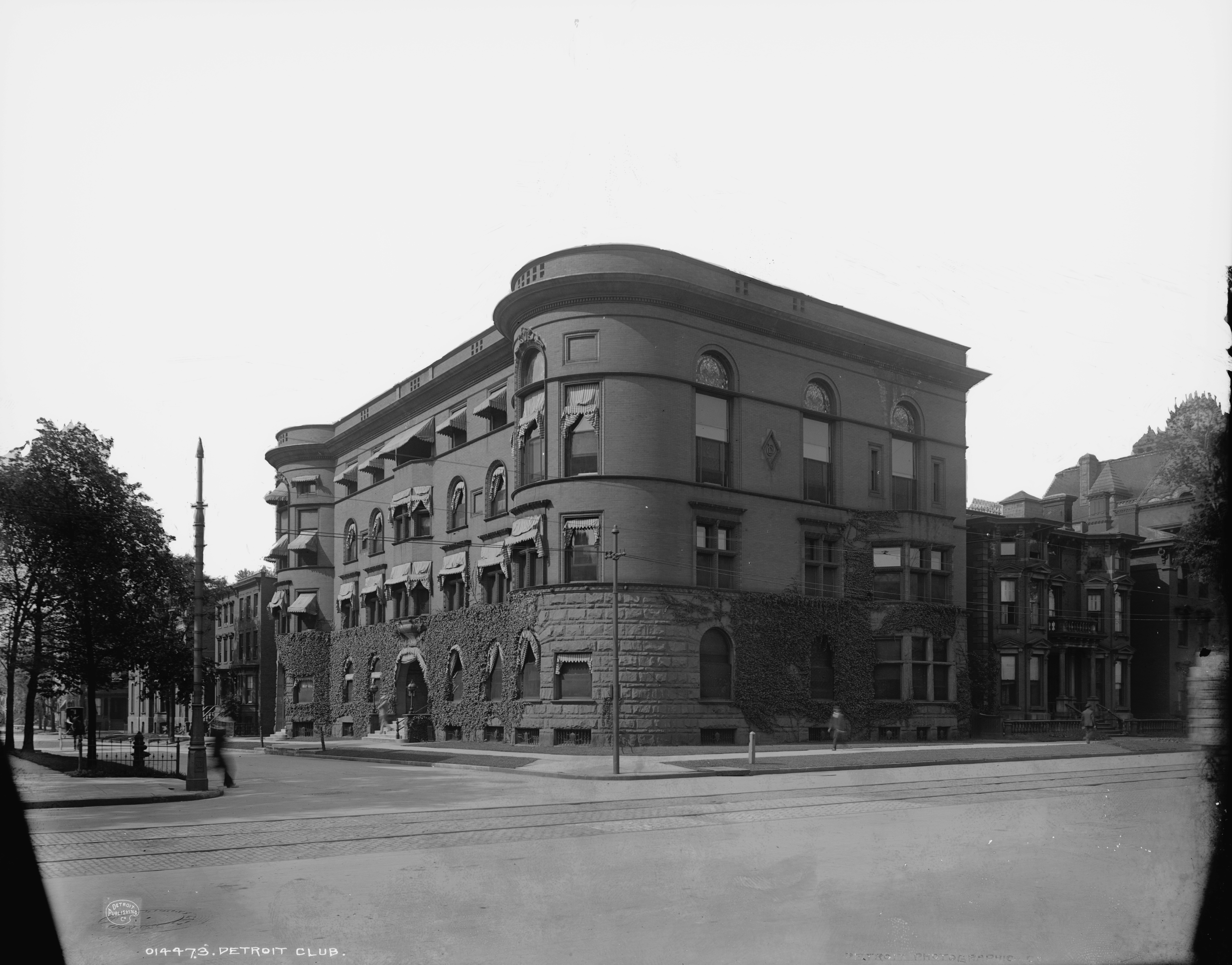
Over a century of Detroit business leaders have belonged to the Detroit Club founded in 1882. Since 1934, business leaders have also belonged to the Detroit Economic Club.

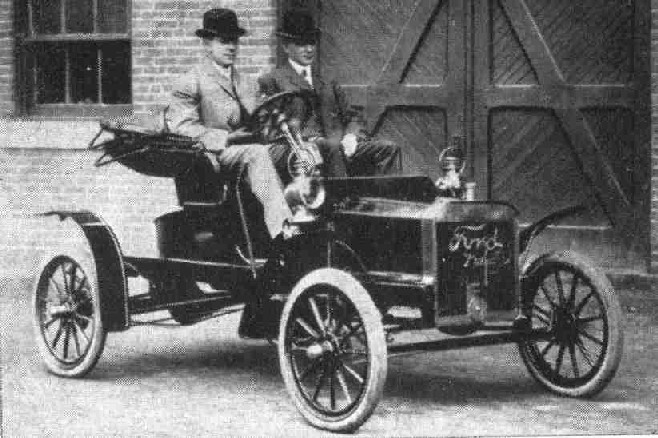
Henry Ford riding in a Ford Model N in front of the Ford Piquette Avenue Plant in Detroit, 1906

At the turn of the 20th century, no one industry was dominant in Detroit. Early automotive production, which was still a relatively small industry at the time, is evidenced by structures such as the Ford Piquette Avenue Plant (1904) (a National Historic Landmark), and multiple structures in the surrounding Piquette Avenue Industrial Historic District (including the now-destroyed E-M-F/Studebaker Plant, 1906) and the New Amsterdam Historic District (including the original Cadillac factory, 1905) and small factories such as the Crescent Brass and Pin Company Building (1905). Then as automobile assembly and associated manufacturing came to dominate Detroit over the next thirty years, the newly minted automotive magnates built commercial and office buildings such as General Motors Building (1919), the General Motors Research Laboratory (1928), and the Fisher Building (1928).

Henry Ford revolutionized the automobile industry at the Highland Park Ford Plant in 1913 when he introduced the first automobile moving assembly line. His innovation transformed mass production and catalyzed Detroit's growth and industrialization. Around the start of the 20th century, entrepreneurs in the Detroit area capitalized on the already-existing machine tool and coach-building industry in the city to forge into the production of automobiles. Detroit's central geographic location and access to the Great Lakes and railways gave automobile producers easy access to capital and markets, making Detroit an ideal site for many automobile manufacturers' headquarters. As Ford's rivals quickly adopted his manufacturing techniques, the automobile industry flourished and essentially elevated Detroit from a second-tier industrial city to a world-class city. Thus, Detroit earned its famous nickname, the Motor City.

In 1914, Ford revolutionized labor relations when he announced he would pay workers in his plants five dollars a day— about double the going rate at rival firms. In addition to attracting the best workers in Detroit, Ford's high wage policy effectively stopped the massive turnover rate, raised productivity, lowered overall labor costs and helped to propel the Model T to industry dominance. By the 1920s, however, Ford's formula of cheap cars with few options fell behind General Motors, which emphasized upscale quality and variety, and provided financing for car buyers. Labor relations in the automobile industry transformed again in 1935 when the United Auto Workers labor union was founded in Detroit.

The rapid growth of the automobile industry led to rising demands for labor. Immigrants from Europe initially filled much of the labor demand, but restrictive immigration acts in 1921 and 1924 caused a dramatic reduction in the supply of foreign-born workers to the United States. Meanwhile, the automobile industry was growing exponentially. Beginning during World War I, Ford began hiring African Americans to close the labor shortage. At this time, the hardships of life in the Jim Crow South and the promise of manufacturing jobs in the North brought African Americans to Detroit in large numbers in the Great Migration. This massive influx of workers and their families caused Detroit's population to soar from 265,000 to 1.5 million between 1900 and 1930 and pushed the city's boundaries outward. The population boom led to a severe housing shortage and the construction of public housing aimed at middle-class auto workers.

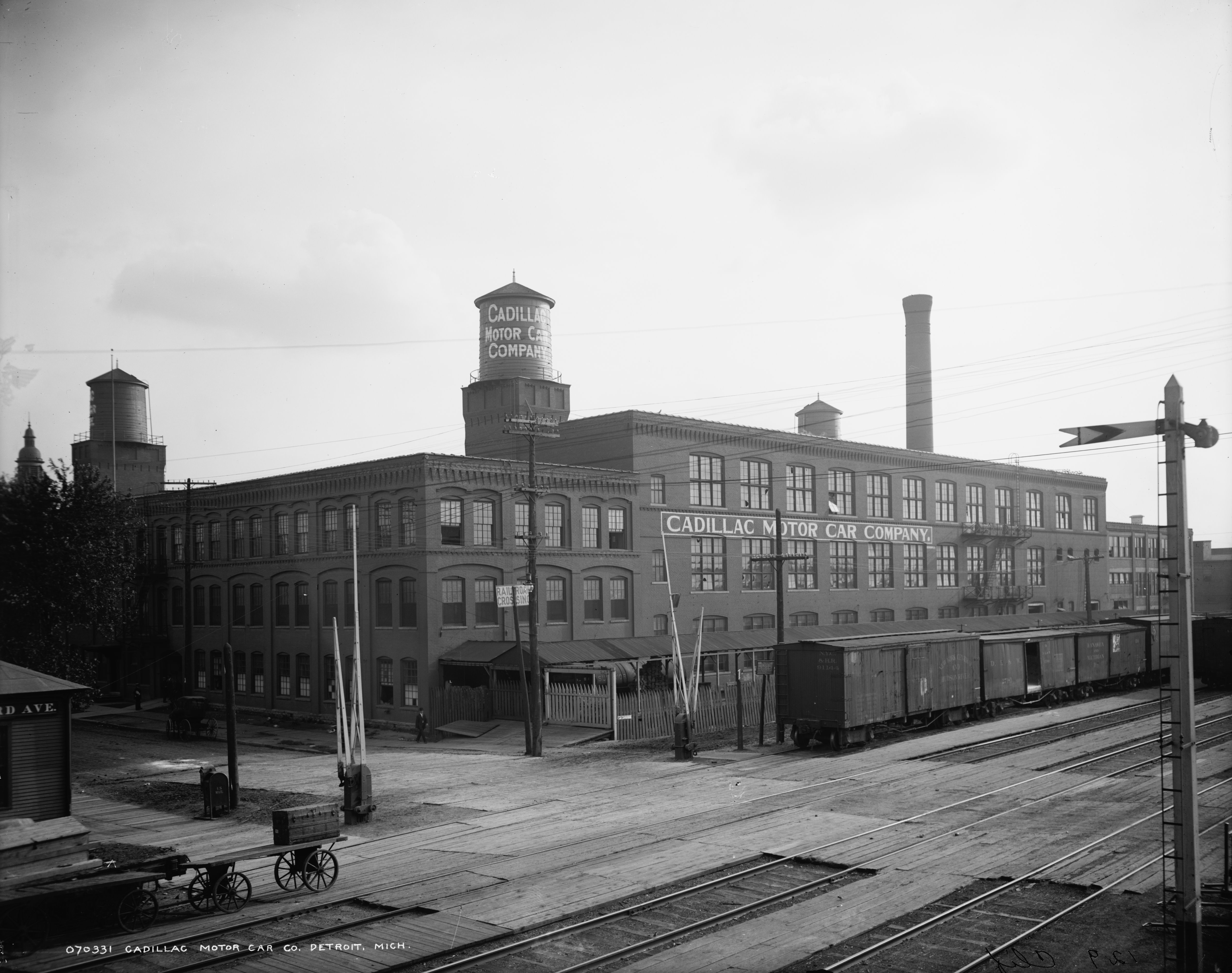
Cadillac Motor Car Co. main plant on Cass Avenue, c. 1910

The rise of the automobile also required rethinking transportation within the city. The Chestnut Street-Grand Trunk Railroad bridge (1929) was a result of a grade separation that unsnarled train and automobile traffic. The Fort Street-Pleasant Street and Norfolk & Western Railroad Viaduct (1928) was a product of the same program, routing trucking traffic over the train traffic, and the West Jefferson Avenue-Rouge River Bridge (1922) allowed the Rouge River to be expanded for barge traffic.

=== Progressive movement ===
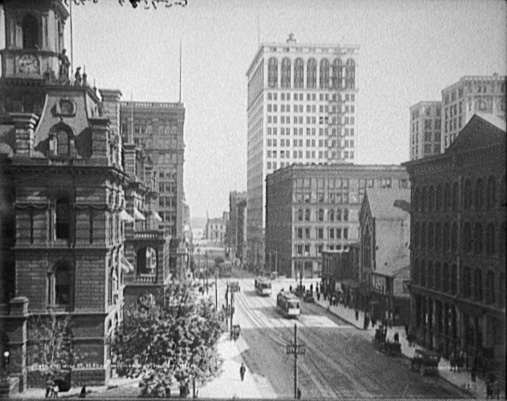
Griswold Street, looking south from Michigan Avenue, c. 1910

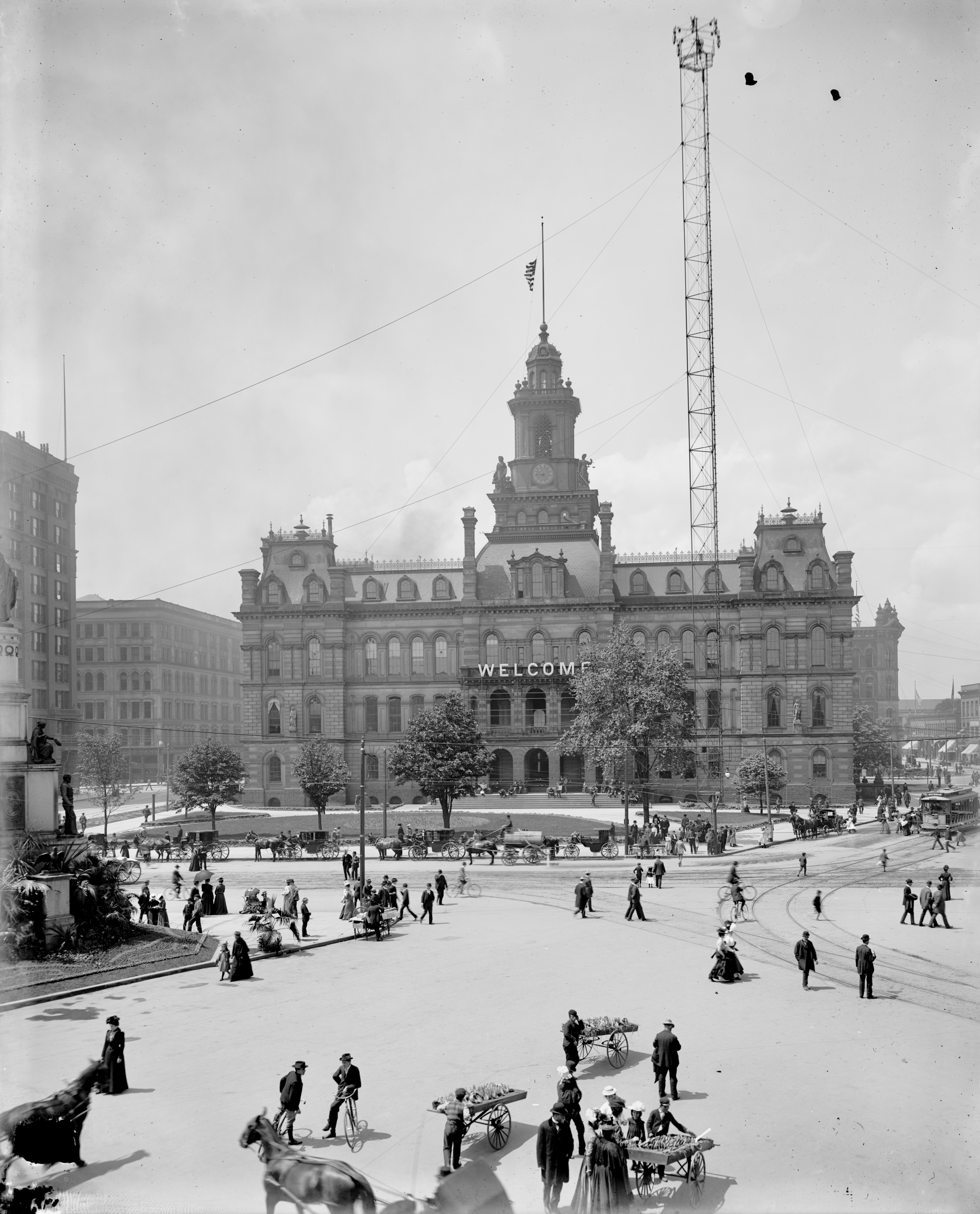
Detroit City Hall, and a moonlight tower, ca. 1900

Progressivism was energized starting in the 1890s by upper-middle-class men and women who felt a civic duty to uplift society by "freeing" it from the tyranny of corrupt politicians who worked hand in hand with unscrupulous saloonkeepers. The most prominent leader was Republican Mayor Hazen S. Pingree. A representative community leader was automaker Henry M. Leland of the Detroit Citizens League. Supported by Detroit's business, professional, and Protestant religious communities, the League campaigned for a new city charter, an anti-saloon ordinance, and the open shop whereby a worker could get a job even if he did not belong to a labor union.

Reinhold Niebuhr, a German-American Protestant minister became nationally famous as a Detroit minister who attacked the KKK, which was strong among white Protestants in the city. In an era when Henry Ford was an American icon, Niebuhr attracted national attention by criticizing the auto industry. He preached the Social Gospel, attacking what he considered the brutalization and insecurity of Ford workers. Niebuhr had moved to the left and was troubled by the demoralizing effects of industrialism on workers. He became an outspoken critic of Ford and allowed union organizers to use his pulpit to expound their message of workers' rights. Niebuhr attacked poor conditions created by the assembly lines and erratic employment practices.

Niebuhr rejected the prevailing optimism that prevailed in the 1920s. He wrote in his diary:

We went through one of the big automobile factories to-day ...The foundry interested me particularly. The heat was terrific. The men seemed weary. Here manual labor is a drudgery and toil is slavery. The men cannot possibly find any satisfaction in their work. They simply work to make a living. Their sweat and their dull pain are part of the price paid for the fine cars we all run. And most of us run the cars without knowing what price is being paid for them. ... We are all responsible. We all want the things which the factory produces and none of us is sensitive enough to care how much in human values the efficiency of the modern factory costs.

The historian Ronald H. Stone thinks that Niebuhr never talked to the assembly line workers (many of his parishioners were skilled craftsmen) but projected feelings onto them after discussions with Rev. Samuel Marquis. As some studies of assembly line workers have shown, the work may have been dull, but workers had complex motivations and could find ways to make meaning of their experiences; many boasted about their jobs and tried hard to place their sons on the assembly line. Ford tried but failed to control work habits.

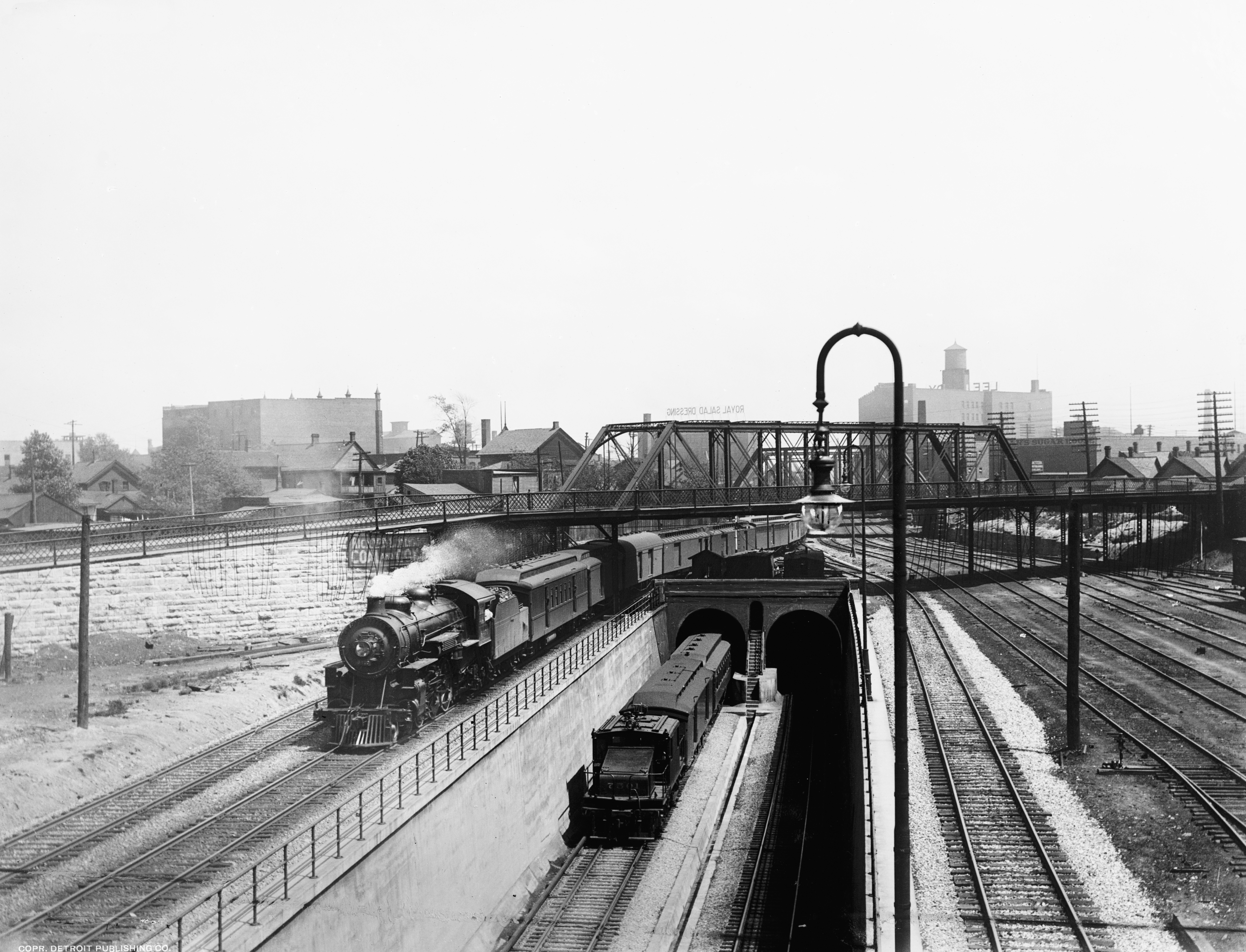
Michigan Central Railway Tunnel, 1910s

Sociologists who interviewed workers concluded that they were more interested in controlling their home lives than their work lives. The Ford solution was welfare capitalism, paying relatively high wages with added benefits, such as vacations and retirement, that reduced turnover and appealed primarily to family men. Link and Link conclude that by tying half a man's wages to the company's profit, Ford managers offered "a highly successful wage incentive plan that simultaneously increased job satisfaction and raised the productivity of labor".

=== Gilded Age ===
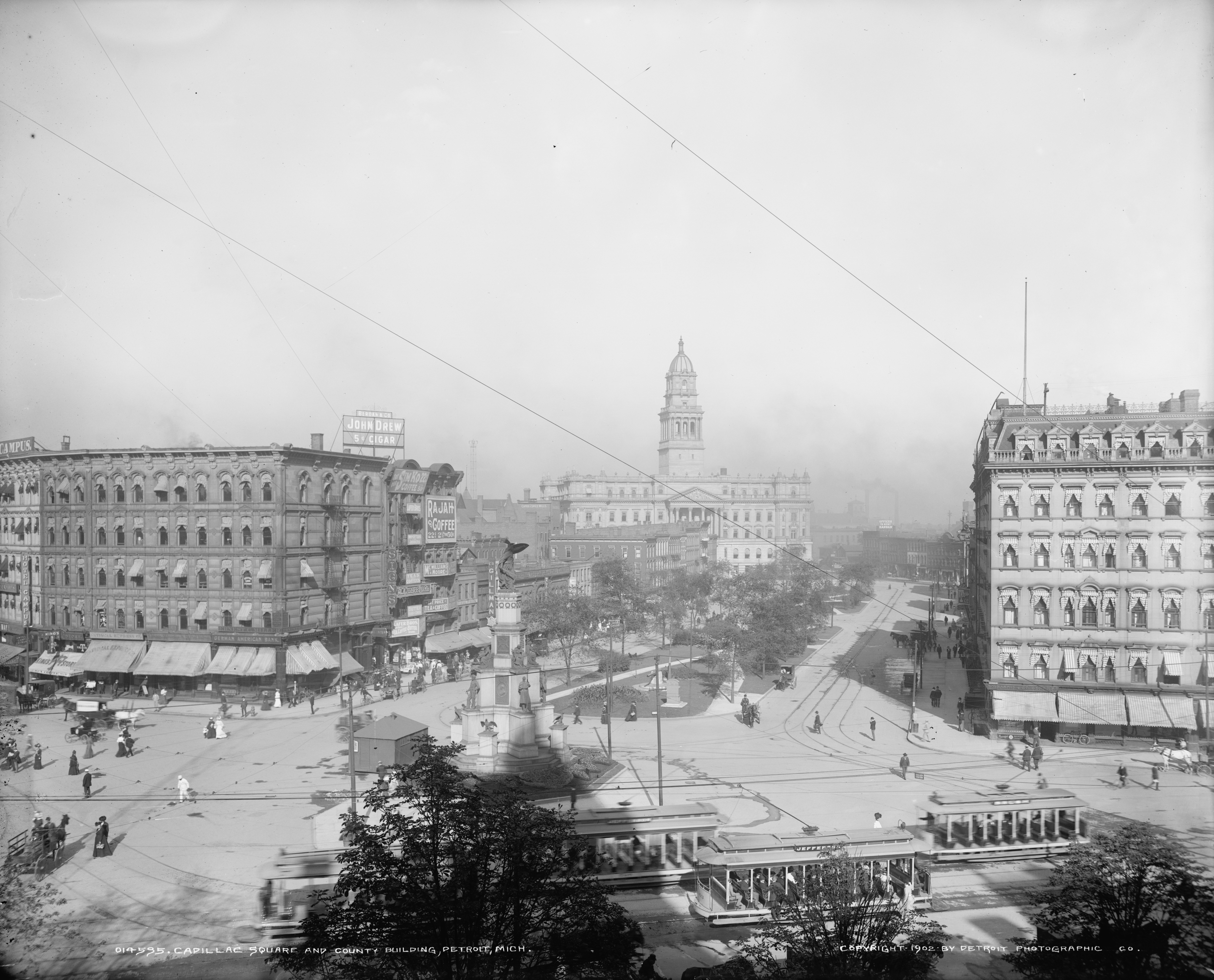
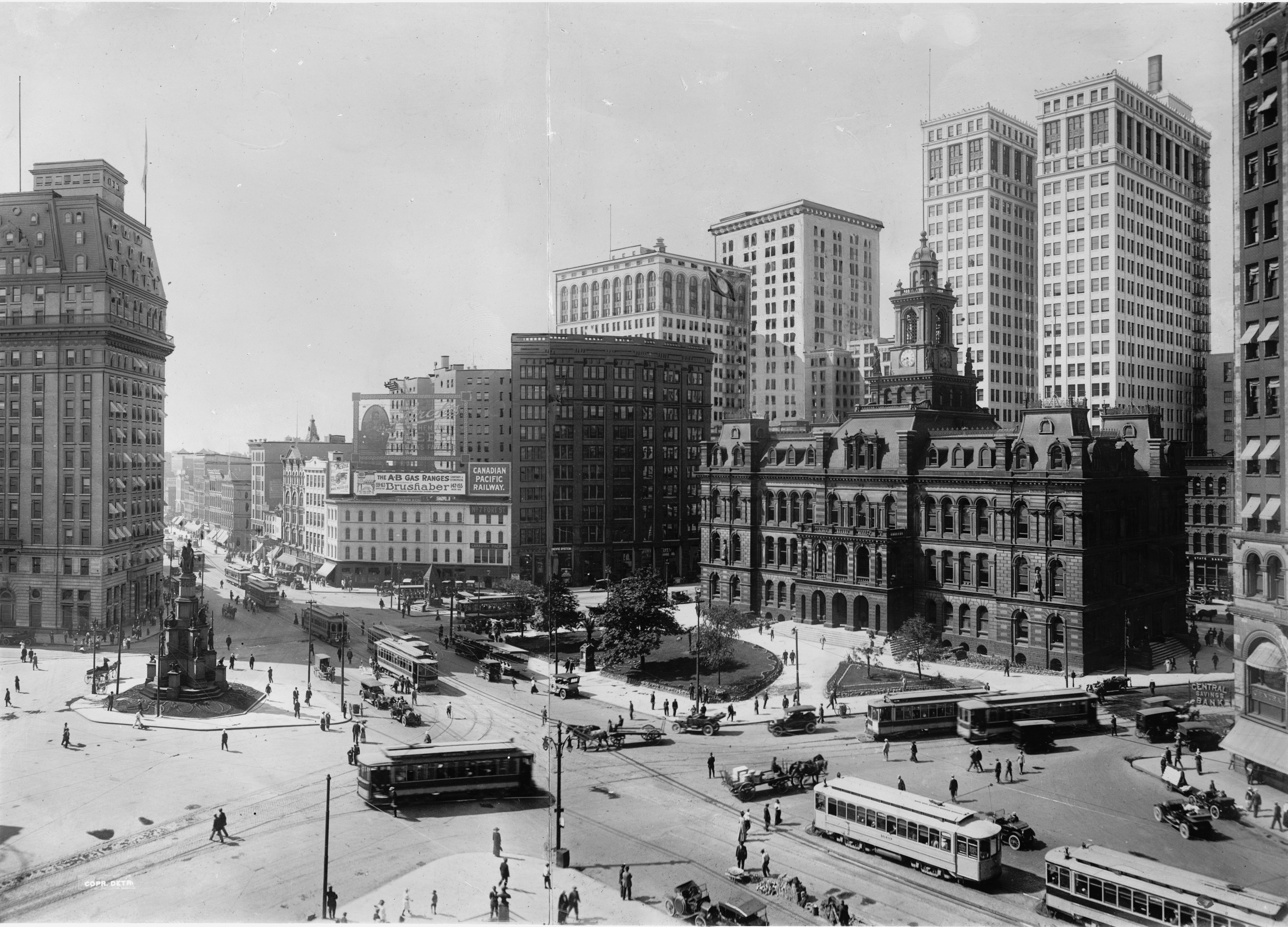
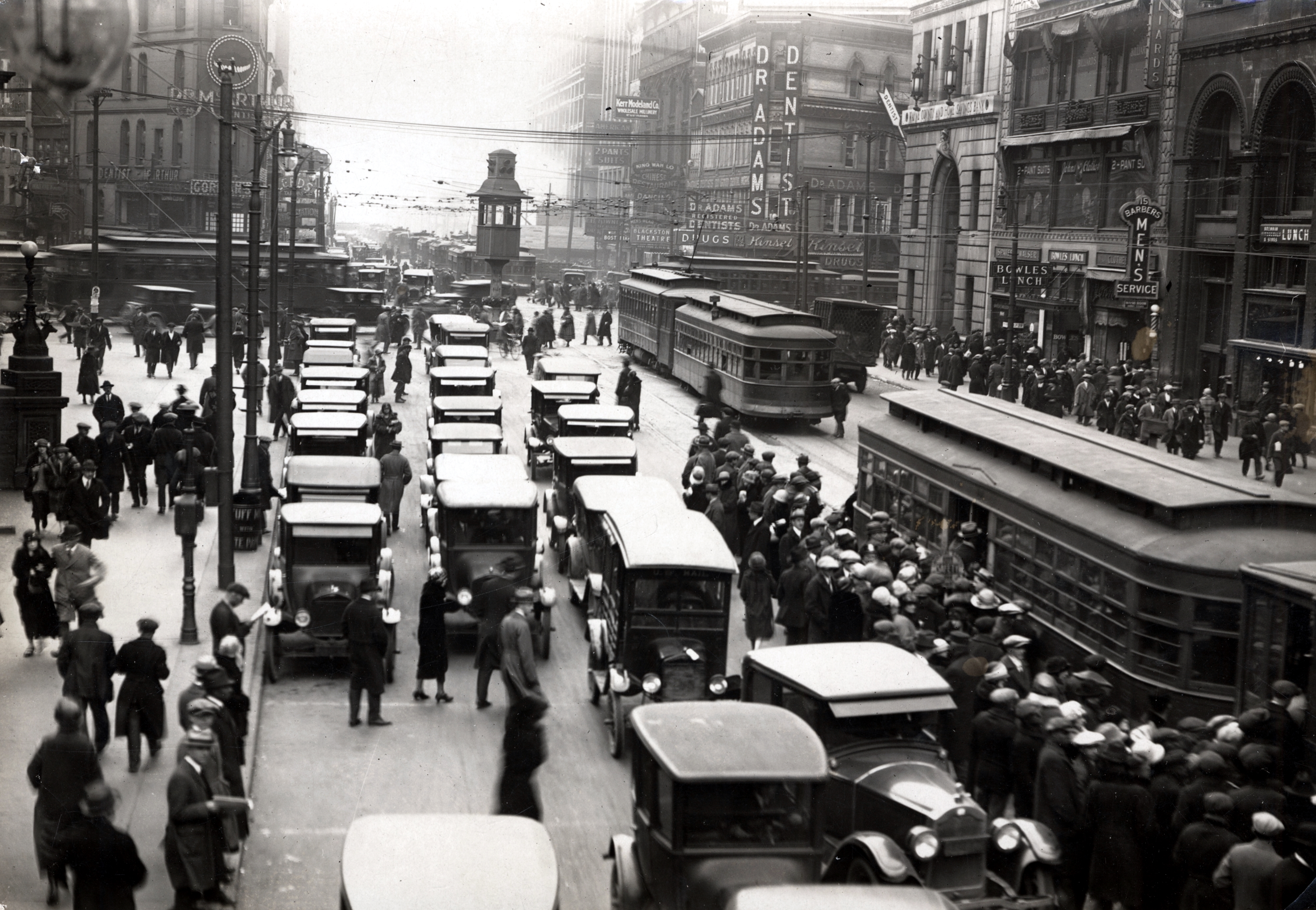
The City of Detroit in the early 20th century. From top to bottom: the Cadillac Square and county building; The Cadillac Square in the 1910s, with the old Detroit City Hall in the right and the Michigan Soldiers' and Sailors' Monument in the left; Corner of Michigan Avenue and Griswold Street, circa 1920.

At the beginning of the 20th century, historic Gilded Age areas such as Brush Park gave rise to even more upscale neighborhoods, including the Boston-Edison, Indian Village, and Palmer Woods. Woodward Avenue neighborhoods (such as the Warren-Prentis Historic District and the Willis-Selden Historic District) became mixed with apartments and commercial buildings. Many architecturally and historically significant churches and cathedrals arose during this period throughout the city's neighborhoods.

Automobile wealth along with educational & technological advancements led to a boom in downtown Detroit business, and the construction of a collection of early 20th century skyscrapers. The most notable of these are the Art Deco National Historic Landmark Guardian Building (1928) and The Fisher Building (1928). Many renowned architects including Albert Kahn, Wirt C. Rowland, and others designed and built a number of the cities skyscrapers and landmarks.

Shopping districts sprang up along Park Avenue, Broadway, and Woodward. In 1881, Joseph Lowthian Hudson opened a small men's clothing store in Detroit. After 10 years he had 8 stores in the midwest and was the most profitable clothing retailer in the country. In 1893, he began construction of J. L. Hudson Department Store at Gratiot and Farmer streets in Detroit. The store grew over the years and a 25-story tower was added in 1928. The final section was a 12-story addition in 1946, giving the entire complex 49 acres (20 ha) of floor space.

Multiple hotels were constructed, including the Fort Shelby Hotel (1916), the Detroit-Leland Hotel (1927), the Royal Palm Hotel (1924), and several others.

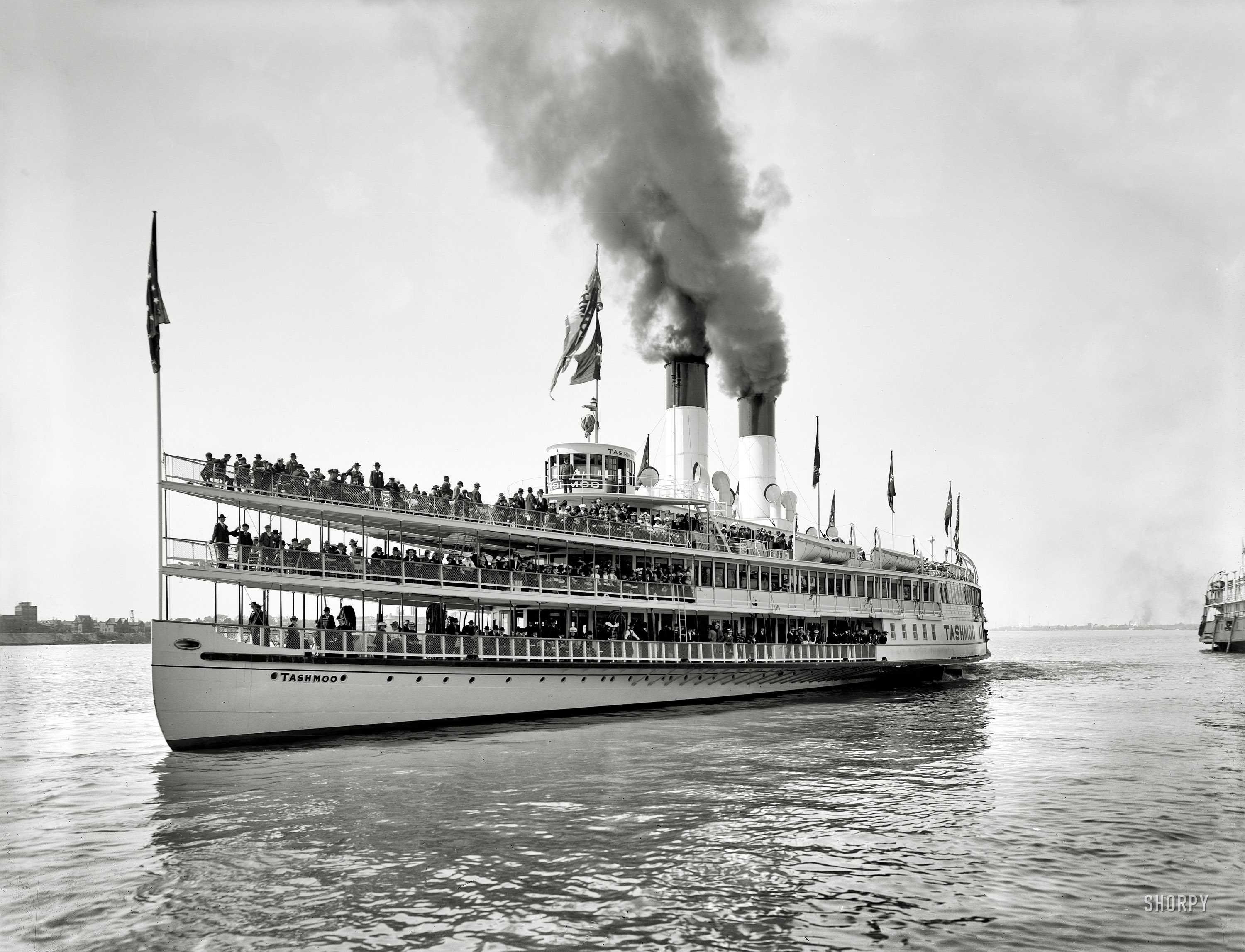
The sidewheeler steamboat PS Tashmoo on Detroit River, 1901

Extravagant movie palaces such as the Fox (1928) and the Palms (1925) entertained thousands every day. Public buildings, such as Orchestra Hall (1919), the Detroit Public Library (1921), and the Detroit Institute of Arts (1923) were inspired by the City Beautiful Movement.

=== Immigrants in the 20th century ===
The development of the automobile industry did more than create a significant increase in Detroit's industrial production. It also changed the demographics of the city by attracting large waves of immigrants from Europe and Canada and black migrants from the South to fill the rising demands for labor. These people, who increased the city's population during the early 1900s, did not just affect the expanding automobile industry; they also transformed neighborhoods by defining certain areas and bringing jobs and money into the local community. Although many people began to pile into Detroit, Thomas Sugrue, author of "The Origins of the Urban Crisis", suggests, "Beginning in the 1920s—and certainly by the 1940s—class and race became more important than ethnicity as a guide to the city's residential geography."

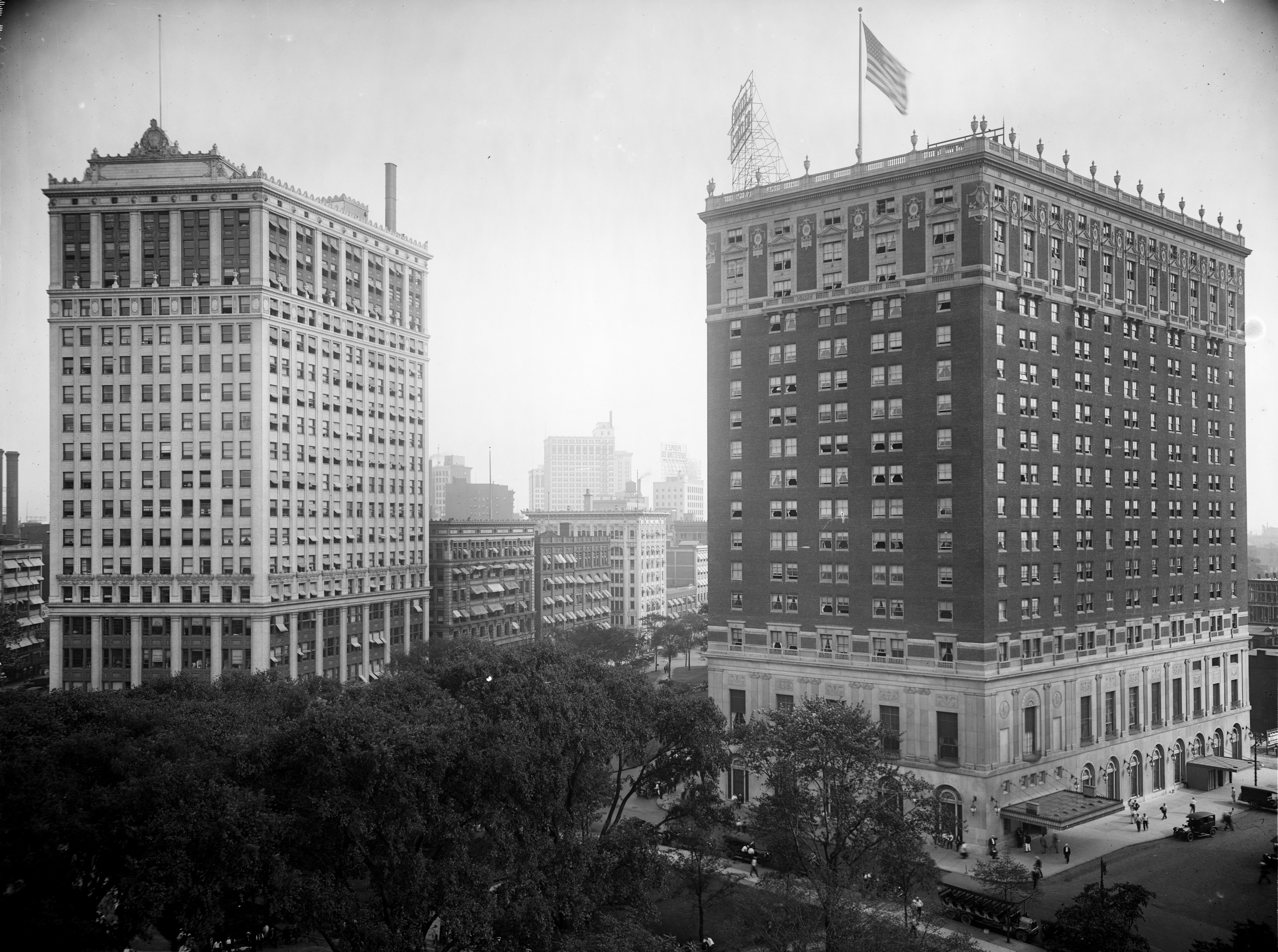
Whitney Building and Detroit Statler Hotel, 1910s

An early wave of immigrants came from Greece in the late 1890s; it peaked from 1910 to 1914. These Greek peasants turned their understanding of supply and demand into thriving businesses as peddlers, grocers, and restaurateurs. Just as they lived in villages in Greece, so did they settle in a new "village" in Detroit known as Greektown. The Greek immigrants retained their native regionalism and factionalism by splitting their Detroit neighborhood into numerous sub-groups. With Americanization, however, the patriarchal culture diminished, although most families remained connected to the Greek Orthodox Church.

Like the Greeks, Italians began to settle in Detroit from 1890 to 1914. While most of these immigrants came from Europe and Canada, thereby blending in with the Caucasian residents already living in the city. Like American blacks, the Italian immigrants faced economic and social discrimination.

By 1914, Jews from Eastern Europe added to the already diverse demographics of Detroit, settling initially in the Hastings Street neighborhood. These new immigrants increased the established German Jewish community to about 34,000 people. Although the relationship between the wealthier, more Americanized German Jews and the poorer, less integrated immigrants tended to be a tense one, anti-Semitism was not an issue. Sugrue explains this by claiming, "Residents of Detroit's white neighborhoods abandoned their ethnic affiliations and found a new identity in their whiteness" (Sugrue 22). Skin color, therefore, became more important than religious belief in the Americanization process.

African Americans—many of whom had migrated from the South to Detroit when jobs opened up during World War II—suffered the most. According to Sugrue, "Black Detroit in 1940 was large and rapidly growing" (Sugrue 23). The residents in Detroit's sizable "black ghetto" often found themselves in dilapidated houses that served as homes for multiple families. African Americans, who were spatially segregated from whites, lived in overcrowded and poorly maintained places like Paradise Valley (Sugrue 23–4, 36). As the community changed, only a handful managed to relocate to the northern part of the city near the Eight Mile/Wyoming area; a selected few succeeded in finding homes in Conant Gardens. Wherever the location, black neighborhoods remained crowded, a result of the Great Migration of blacks to the city.

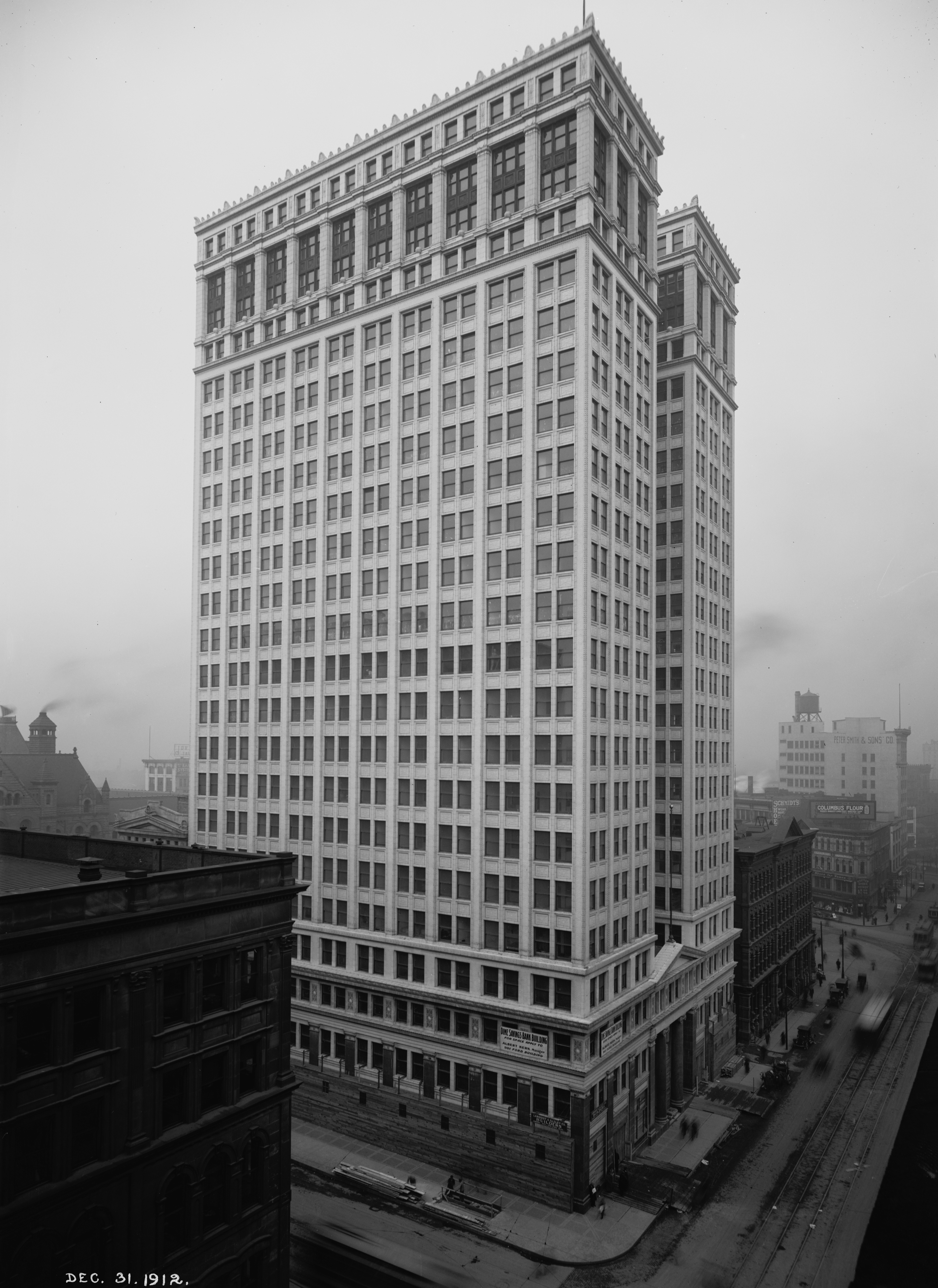
Dime Building, 1912

The rise in the black population mirrored the overall increase in the population of Detroit. Between 1900 and 1930, the number of people in the city grew from 265,000 to more than 1.5 million residents. Polish immigrants contributed to this population surge, becoming in the 1930s a large immigrant group totaling more than 66,000.

The Depression, followed by World War II, further diversified the city. Because political situations made it difficult to leave Europe during this time period, most of the new arrivals to Detroit came from within the United States: whites from Appalachia and blacks from the rural South. Sugrue notes that African Americans comprised more than a quarter of the city's residents by 1960. After 1970, political tensions in the Middle East motivated Arabs, especially Palestinians, to also migrate to Detroit. These immigrants primarily relocated in Dearborn, an area that continues to remain an Arab center in the middle of Detroit.

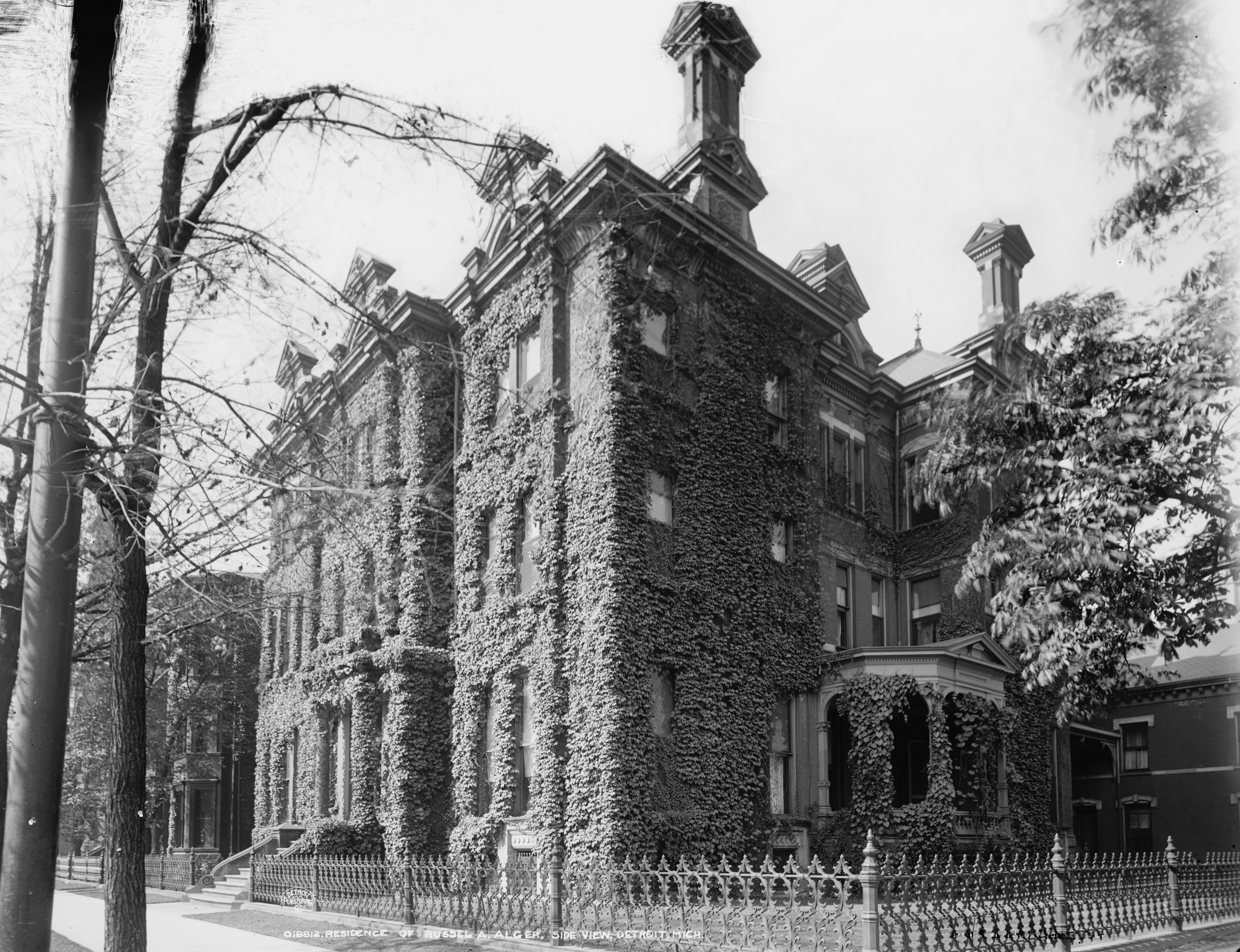
Residence of Russell A. Alger, circa 1905

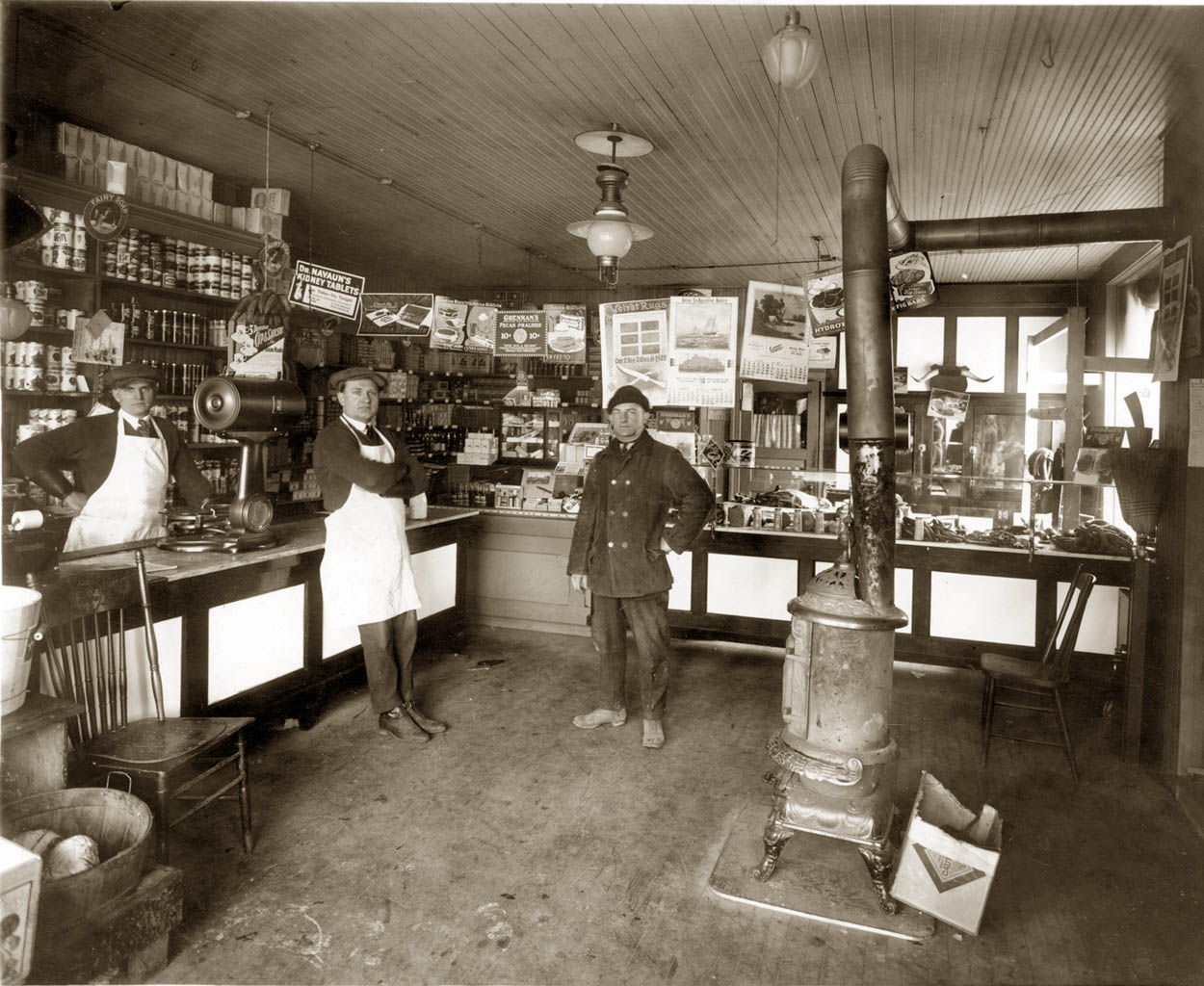
Immigrants opened small neighborhood businesses, often specializing in ethnic food: Grocery store (1922), at 31st and Herbert Street.

Not only did Detroit increase in population during the twentieth century, but it also grew in geographic size. It expanded its borders exponentially by annexing all or part of the incorporated villages of Woodmere (1905), Delray (1905), Fairview (1907), St. Clair Heights (1918), and Warrendale (1925), as well as thousands of acres of land in the surrounding townships. Yet, areas such as Hamtramck and Highland Park maintained their status as legally separate cities within the larger metropolis of Detroit. Detroit, therefore, owes a great deal of its growth to the auto industry. The promise of jobs attracted immigrants from Europe, Asia, and the United States to settle in the Motor City. Originally defined by tightly knit ethnic clusters, the neighborhoods soon began to disperse. As Thomas Sugrue states, "Fewer and fewer white neighborhoods were ethnically homogeneous." Although Detroit remains a large urban center today, it has lost much of its diversity to the suburbs. As a result, the remaining citizens of Detroit—primarily blacks—now face social and economic challenges that prevent them from enjoying lives of quality.

=== Local politics ===
Local politics from the 1870 to the 1910s had been influenced by prominent ethnic communities, especially German Americans and Irish Catholics who controlled the Democratic Party. This changed after 1910 as the old-stock Protestant business leaders, especially from the automobile industry, led a Progressive Era crusade for efficiency, and elected their own men to office, typified by James J. Couzens (mayor, 1919–1922, US Senator, 1922–1936). The critical change took place in 1918 when the voters changed the Common Council from a 42-man body elected on a partisan basis from 21 wards, to a nine-man unit, elected on a non-partisan basis from the city at-large. The ethnics (especially the Germans) and the Democrats lost their political base. After 1930, however, the Democratic party rebuilt its strength, formed an alliance with the United Auto Workers union and restored the leadership of the ethnics, as typified by Frank Murphy (mayor 1930–1933, governor 1937–1939). Mayors Jerome Cavanagh (1962–1970) and Roman Gribbs (1970–1974) were the last of the white ethnic mayors, until 2014. The election of Coleman Young (1974–1993) as mayor in 1974 brought to power a new generation of black leaders who represented the city's new majority.

=== Women in the 20th century ===
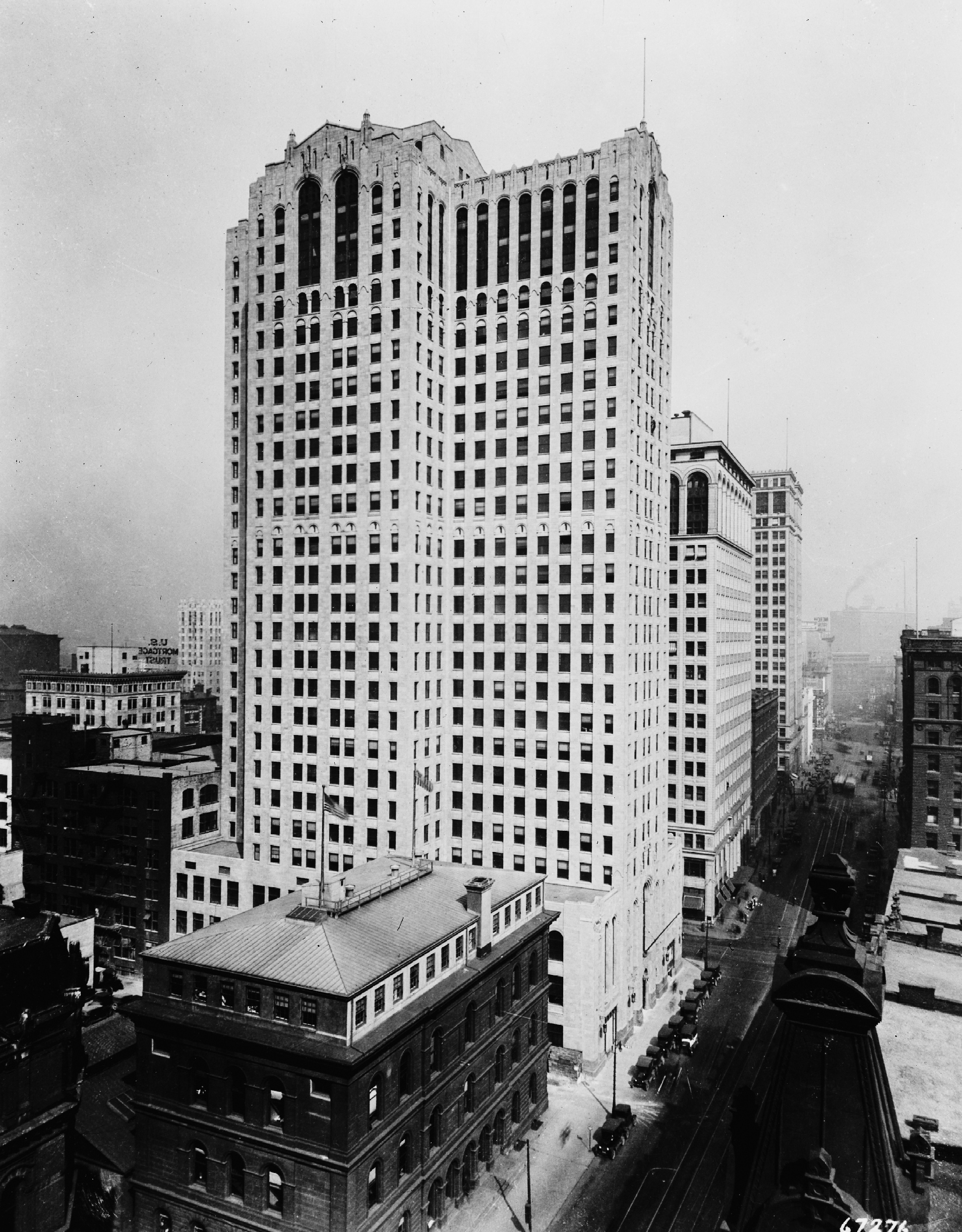
Buhl Building, 1920

Most young women took jobs before marriage, then quit. Before the growth of high schools after 1900, most women left school after the 8th grade at about age 15. Ciani (2005) shows that type of work they did reflected their ethnicity and marital status. Black mothers were often day labors, usually as domestic servants, because other opportunities were limited. Most mothers receiving pensions were white and sought work only when necessary.

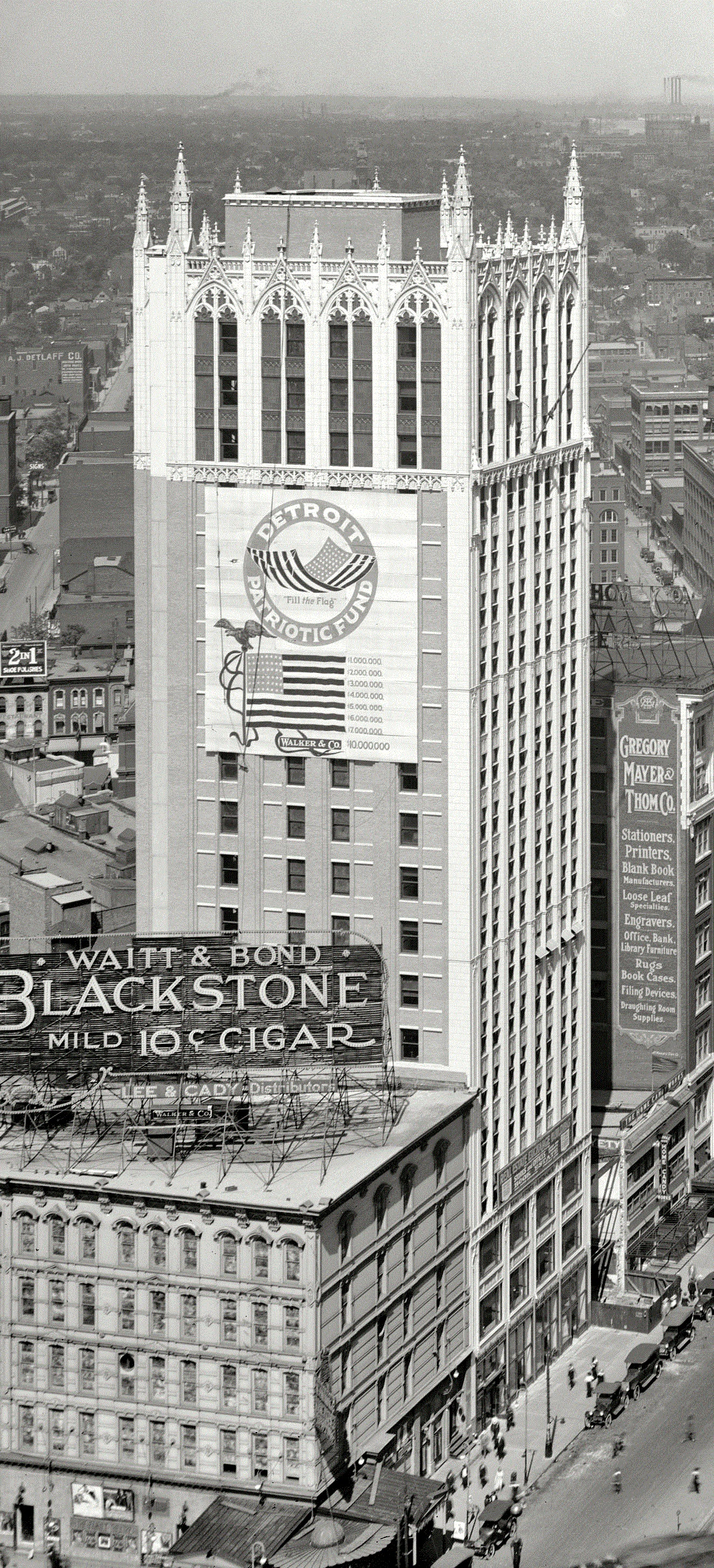
Cadillac Square Building looking east from the Dime Bank Building, between 1910 and 1920

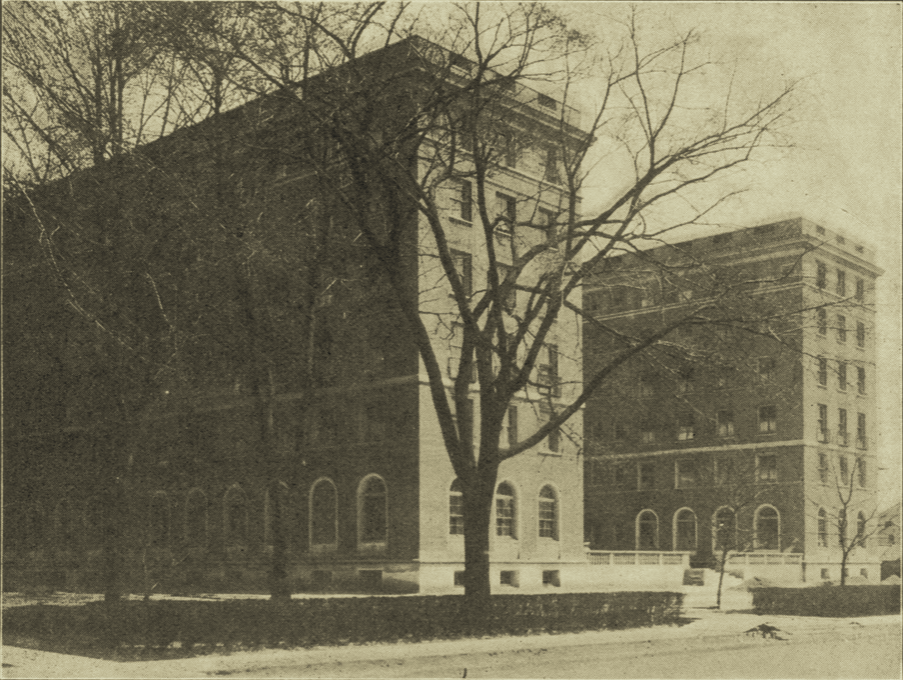
McLaughlin Hall, a World War I memorial to the nurses of Harper Hospital, 1922

Nursing became professionalized in the late 19th century, opening a new middle-class career for talented young women of all social backgrounds. The School of Nursing at Detroit's Harper Hospital, begun in 1884, was a national leader. Its graduates worked at the hospital and also in institutions, public health services, as private duty nurses, and volunteered for duty at military hospitals during the Spanish–American War and the two world wars.

In the early 20th century, the middle-class women of the Detroit Federation of Women's Clubs' (DFWC) promoted civic mindedness within the context of traditional gender roles. Most of them were married to prominent business and professional leaders. Issues of public health, sanitation, and public safety were of vital concern to all families. The DFWC pressured city leaders to provide adequate education and sanitation facilities, safe food handling, and traffic safety. They did not form coalitions with working class or ethnic women, nor labor unions. A Women's Citizens League was established and led by Lucia Voorhees Grimes.

World War II spurred the transition toward women holding a more active role in society. As more men enlisted, women were expected to take up their mantle in factories, defense industries and American businesses. In fact, an increasing number of women became their family's main breadwinner; social campaigns like the famous "Rosie the Riveter" further reinforced the idea of an independent working woman.

Despite these circumstances, the stereotypical image of women in society was hard-pressed to change. Although women were granted more opportunities of employment, they were still continuously shut out of traditionally male-dominated roles, including metalwork, chemicals, tool-making, steel, and construction. This is ironic, considering Detroit was a production hub during the war—its many automotive factories were continuously churning out tanks, aircraft, and weapons. These gender-based restrictions limited the types of jobs women could hold, which led many women to work entry-level jobs in assembly lines where they were not expected, nor authorized, to partake in more physical tasks. Because women could not participate in these more grueling tasks, employers used this as an excuse to under-pay them, and restrict their benefits. Women were still expected to be responsible for house-work and childcare, making it difficult for them to work the longer hours, and resulted in high rates of absenteeism, leaving them with an unsteady source of income. This created a vicious cycle, where women were simultaneously expected to take on the role of the "man of the house", while not being given the same opportunities males were. The on-going tug-of-war between country and family left many women in a limbo, where they could not safely rely on their work to afford supporting their children.

African American women were especially discriminated against, on the basis of both their race and sex. Many firms and factories prioritized white women, leading to African American women working in more dangerous environments where they were often harassed by their white male co-workers. In 1943, out of the 50 war production plants in Detroit that hired women, only 19 allowed African American women to work. Due to these restrictions, only 20% of African American women had a job by 1950, leaving many of their families searching for domestic or short-term stints to afford housing and food.

It is often said that women "gained more rights" during World War II. While it is true that women were encouraged to take a more proactive position in society, they were still faced with many barriers—especially women of color. It was difficult to raise an entire family with the number of job restrictions and lack of employment opportunities that women experienced. When their husbands and white men specifically, returned from war, they were often given their previously held employment positions, leaving newly widowed women to search elsewhere for any work.

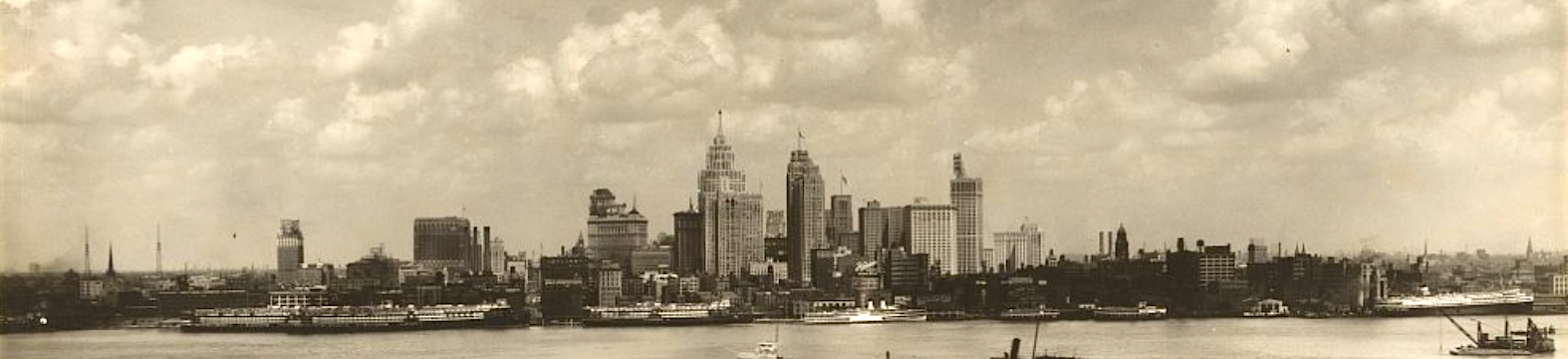
The Detroit skyline, 1929

=== Great Depression ===
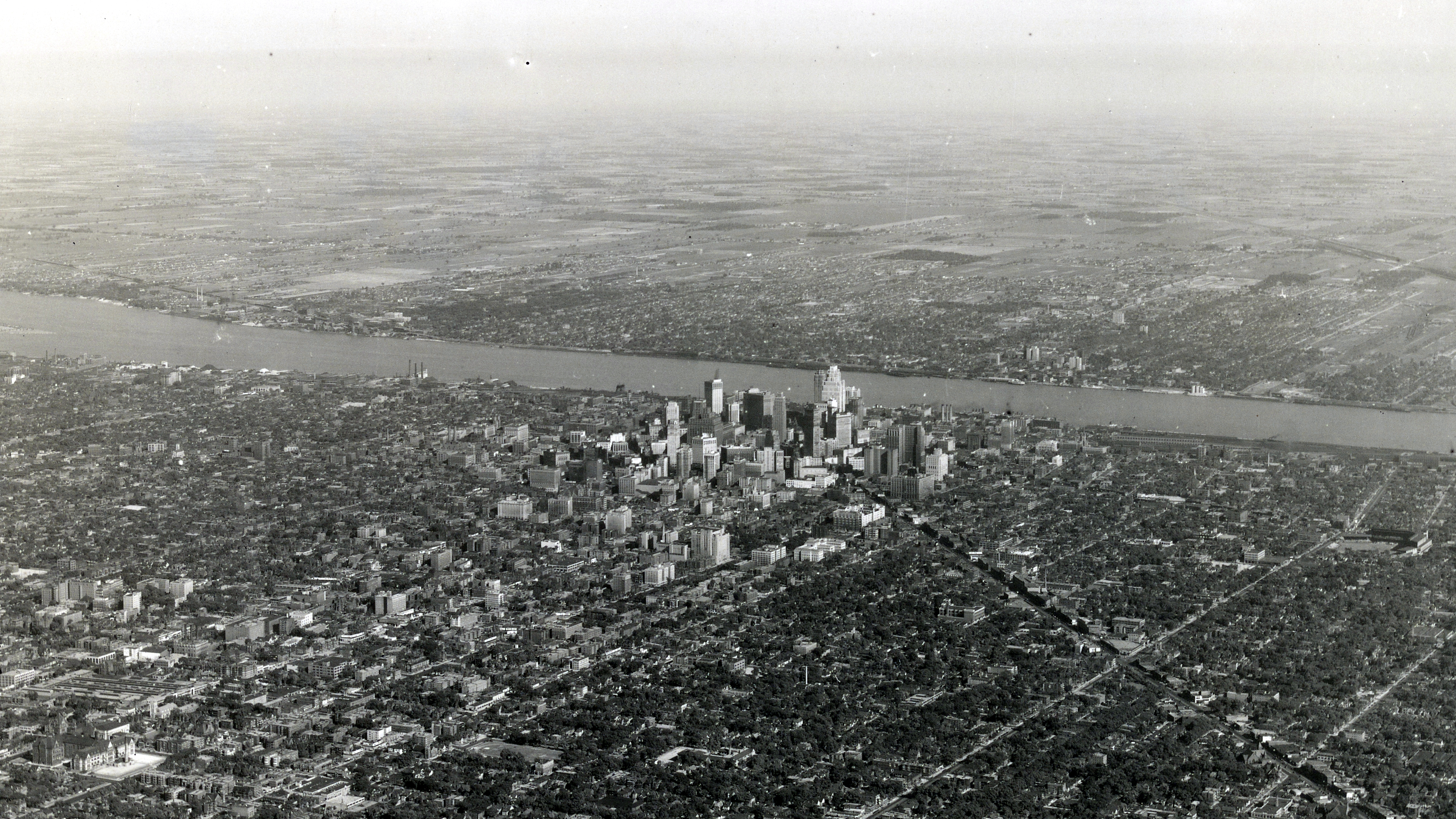
Aerial photo of Detroit taken around 1932

After the 1928 presidential campaign of Catholic Al Smith, the Democrats mobilized a large number of Polish and other Catholic ethnics to make their comeback. Although the election for mayor was nonpartisan, the Democrats rallied behind Judge Frank Murphy, who served as mayor 1930–33. The Great Depression was devastating for Detroit, as sales of automobiles plunged and there were large-scale layoffs at all industrial enterprises. Murphy insisted that no one would go hungry, and set up the Mayor's Unemployment Committee that set up relief soup kitchens and potato gardens. In 1933, Murphy resigned, and Frank Couzens was elected mayor, serving until 1938. He was the son of Republican U.S. Senator James Couzens, who had been mayor in 1919–22. In 1933, the city was in a financial crisis, as tax receipts had plunged and welfare spending had skyrocketed. The city had defaulted on its bond payments and had to use promissory notes (" script") to pay teachers, policemen and other employees. Couzens restored the city's financial credibility by cutting the debt and balancing the budget. He obtained large sums of federal relief money, and upgraded the street-lighting program and the sewage system.

==== Labor unions ====
Detroit in 1940 (8:50)
1940 color 8mm footage of Metro Detroit

As Detroit became more industrialized, workers banded together to establish labor unions, such as the United Auto Workers in 1940. These unions settled wage, time, and benefit disputes with manufacturers. Though labor unions were less powerful than the manufacturers themselves, they shaped much of the development of Detroit's labor market, especially during World War II. Over 50% of Detroit's laborers belonged to a union by 1950, which in theory increased their image as "one unified body" from a manufacturer's perspective. With so many employees involved in unions, manufacturers were more prone to listening to their demands, which established a good working relationship between both parties, and led to "economic security and employment stability" for unionized laborers.

Despite these benefits, however, labor unions were less beneficial toward people of color, especially African Americans. Their decisions often allowed, or even reinforced, discriminatory hiring practices by prioritizing white males compared to African American workers. They rarely vouched for African Americans in management positions, leading to most hired African Americans working entry-level positions for years. This created a long-standing falsified reputation of African Americans in the industrial sector: since few were given the opportunity to be in management positions, employers automatically—and wrongly—assumed they did not deserve to be.

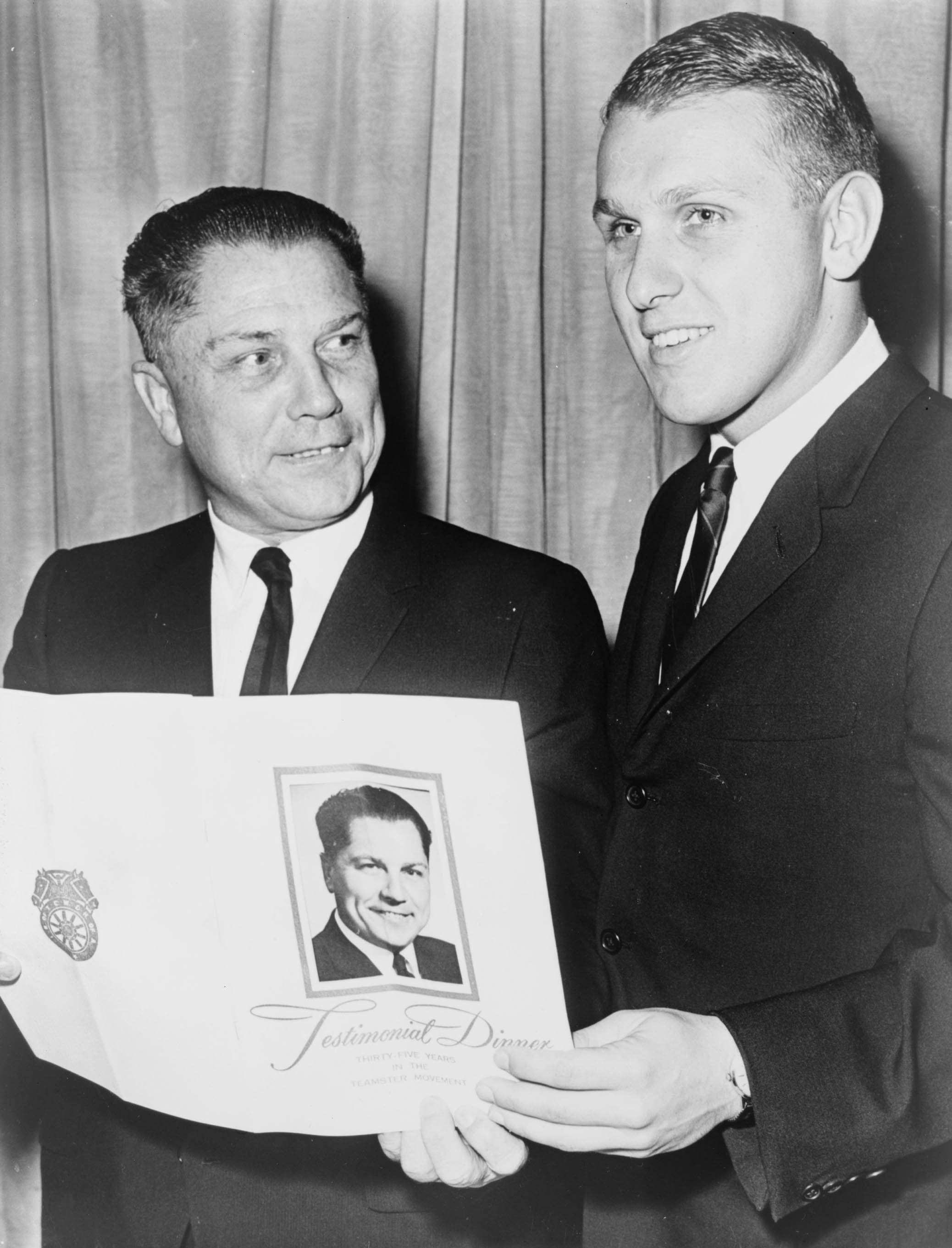
Jimmy Hoffa and his son James P. Hoffa. Jimmy Hoffa served as the president of the International Brotherhood of Teamsters (IBT) from 1957 to 1971.

Like most things, labor unions showcased both the positives and negatives of Detroit's history. They were created to grant more transparency between workers and their employers, but only reinforced the socio-economic divide between white workers and workers of color. Over time, however, the role of the union has become more diversified. In the later years of the Great Depression, unions like the United Auto Workers partnered with African American churches and civil rights organizations like the NAACP to integrate African American workers into the benefits that other workers already received. They increased African American membership, vouched for more civil rights in the workforce, and are a large reason for the increase in African American employment during World War II, when factories and manufacturers were in need of more workers. In fact, labor activism during the later 20th century increased influence of union leaders in the city such as Jimmy Hoffa of the Teamsters and Walter Reuther of the autoworkers.

The unionization process in autos was led by CIO organizers. The strongest response came not from semi-skilled assembly line men, but from the militant leadership of skilled tool and die makers of Irish ethnicity. They had been complacent during the late 1920s but reacted with extreme militancy to the hardships of the depression. Following the success of the sit down strikes at General Motors, non-unionized, semi-skilled workers followed suit in numerous plants in 1937. They were supported by the pro-union mood of the city, the New Deal's permissive political climate, and Governor Frank Murphy's pro-labor sympathies. They won many concessions and formed numerous locals outside the auto industry. Ford, however, successfully resisted unions until 1941.

=== World War II and the "Arsenal of Democracy" ===
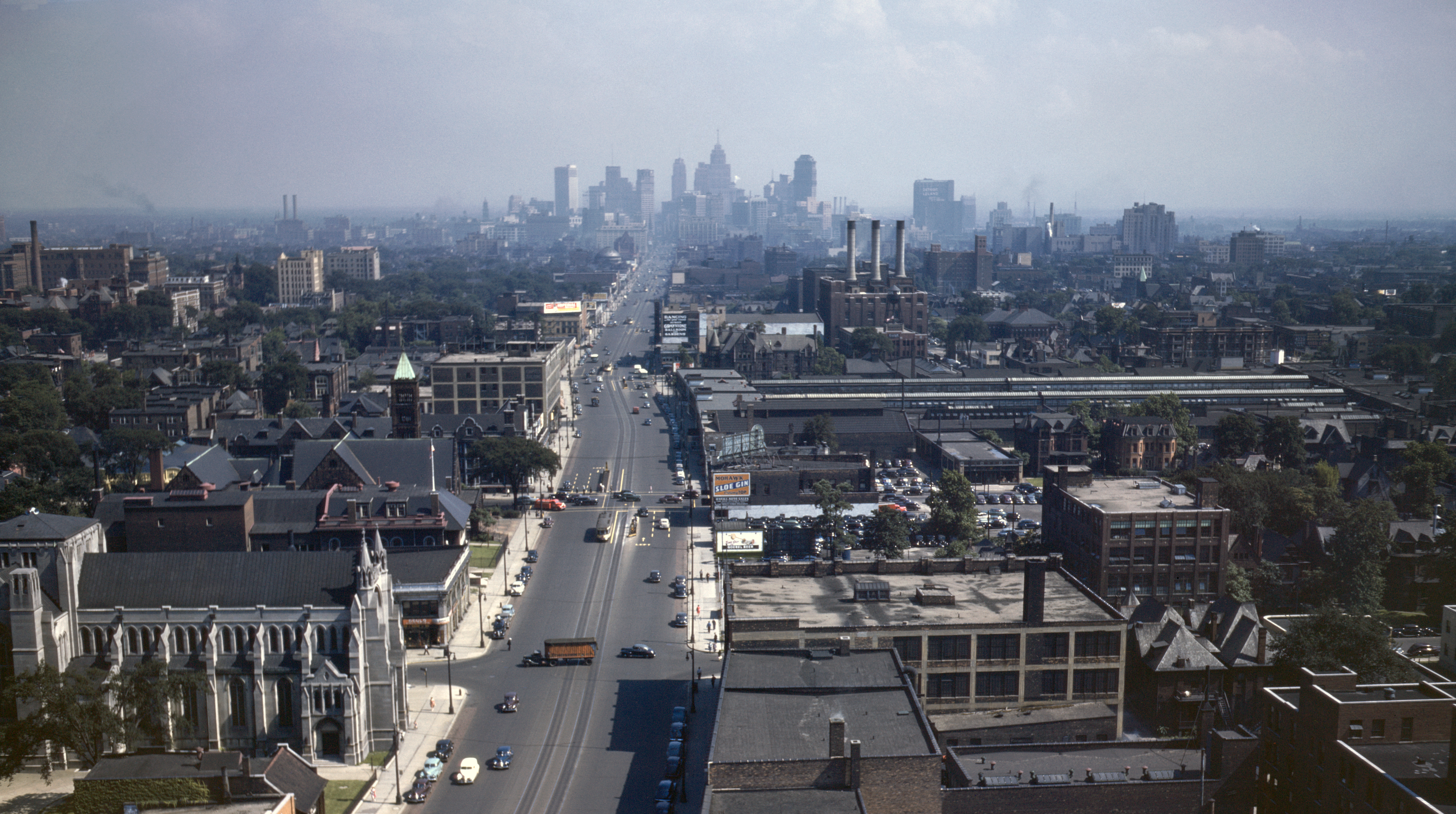
The Detroit skyline, July 1942. Photograph by Arthur Siegel.

The entry of the United States into World War II brought tremendous changes to the city. From 1942 to 1945, production of commercial automobiles in the city ceased entirely, as its factories were used instead to construct M5 tanks, jeeps, and B-24 bombers for the Allies. The Guardian Building was converted into a headquarters for wartime production. The city made a major contribution to the Allied war effort as part of America's Arsenal of Democracy. Historians note that this accolade was "easily and often corrupted to 'arsehole'" by tired Detroiters waiting in lines everywhere. The government believed that Detroit was vulnerable to air attack, and encouraged companies to diversify production to outside the region.

The B-24 Liberator, the most produced bomber in history, was used to bomb Germany heavily. Before the war, the aviation industry could produce, optimally, one such plane a day at an aircraft plant. By 1943, Ford's plants managed to produce one B-24 an hour at a peak of 600 per month in 24-hour shifts. Many pilots slept on cots waiting for takeoff as the B-24 rolled off the assembly line at Ford's Willow Run facility.

Detroit's wartime manufacturing boom coincided with the decline of Southern agriculture, attracting hundreds of thousands of Southern Blacks to the city in search of economic security and freedom from racist Jim Crow laws. The ongoing draft pillaged Detroit's industrial labor supply, leaving a labor shortage so dire that former auto plants had no choice but to hire black workers. According to a 1944 report, "a 44% advance in wartime employment brought with it an advance of 103% in the total number of Negroes employed".

As Detroit's black population continued to increase, housing options grew distressingly scarce. Unscrupulous landlords took advantage of the influx of black workers and limited housing supply, gouging monthly rent prices in Black neighborhoods. In some cases, Black tenants paid "20 to 40 percent more for rent than whites in equivalent apartments". Spending the majority of their meager wages on rent, Blacks had no disposable income left to afford the upkeep and repair of their rental properties. Lacking maintenance, the decrepit homes of black neighborhoods turned substandard: grossly congested, lacking water and ventilation, infested with vermin, and prone to fires. White homeowners attributed Black poverty to "individual moral deficiencies", strengthening their collective desire to preserve segregation.

President Roosevelt's New Deal tried to alleviate the housing crisis by simultaneously subsidizing the construction of public housing and private, single-family homes. Working-class whites staunchly opposed public housing, claiming that it jeopardized the construction of new homes and disturbed the "racial and architectural homogeneity" of their neighborhoods. The anti public-housing movement appropriated World War II rhetoric to denounce public housing as a communist conspiracy, a catalyst of racial struggle that would "destroy traditional American values". Too poor to join the cohorts of whites fleeing to racially-homogenous suburbs, working-class whites banded together to terrorize Blacks out of their neighborhoods. In 1941, the Detroit Housing Commission announced the construction of the Sojourner Truth housing project in the Seven-Mile Fenelon neighborhood. Months of protest by the Seven Mile-Fenelon Improvement Association climaxed on February 28, 1942, the day the first black families moved into the project. A vicious race riot resulted in 40 injuries and 220 arrests, the majority of which were black. Seven years later, Mayor Albert Cobo announced he was "putting brakes on all public housing development outside of heavily black inner-city neighborhoods" much to the delight of the white voters who elected him.

Although President Roosevelt's promise of private homeownership was meant to extend to blacks, local implementation of housing policy further solidified the ghettoization of black neighborhoods. The Home Owners' Loan Corporation (HOLC) subsidized "home purchases and improvements with low-interest loans" in order to "protect homeownership from foreclosure". The appraisal practices of HOLC agents, which determined eligibility for subsidized loans and mortgages, excluded Blacks from private homeownership through the structurally racist process of redlining. Racially restrictive housing covenants further limited housing options for black people, even after the 1948 Supreme Court case Shelley vs Kraemer reversed the legality of such covenants.

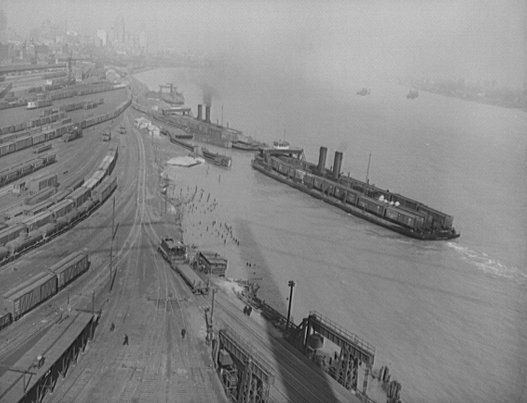
Aerial view of a classification yard and two train ferries on the Detroit River, 1943. Photograph by Arthur Siegel.

During World War II, Detroit became a center of industry, largely due to its innovative roots. The treatment of African Americans during World War II, however, represented the duality between an increase in labor and a decrease in the standard of living. The United States preached the gospel of freedom and human rights abroad while discriminatory federal policy, executed by a racist city government, robbed Black Detroiters of safe and affordable housing. Racial animosity over limited housing only mounted as veterans returned home from the war, boiling over in the riot-ridden 1950s and 1960s.

=== Postwar era ===
In economic terms, the postwar years 1945–1970 brought high levels of prosperity as the automobile industry had its most prosperous quarter-century.

Although Detroit had a Rapid Transit Commission, it was not popular with the politicians or the public after the strikes of 1946 ended and automobile production resumed. People demanded cars so they could commute from work to spacious houses surrounded by grass instead of riding the trolley to cramped upstairs apartments. During the war, three expressways were built to support the region's war industries. Furthermore, the wartime model of federal, state, and local governments jointly planning and funding expressways gave a successful model for planning and financing more highways. Progress was slow from 1945 to 1947 because of inflation, steel shortages, and the difficulty of building in built-up areas. by the early 1950s highways were in place, and plans were underway to make Detroit a central hub in the forthcoming Interstate Highway System. The new highways had a funding advantage over mass transit because of the availability of federal highway monies coupled with the availability of matching state money. Ultimately, they were paid for by gasoline taxes, which commuters seldom grumbled about.

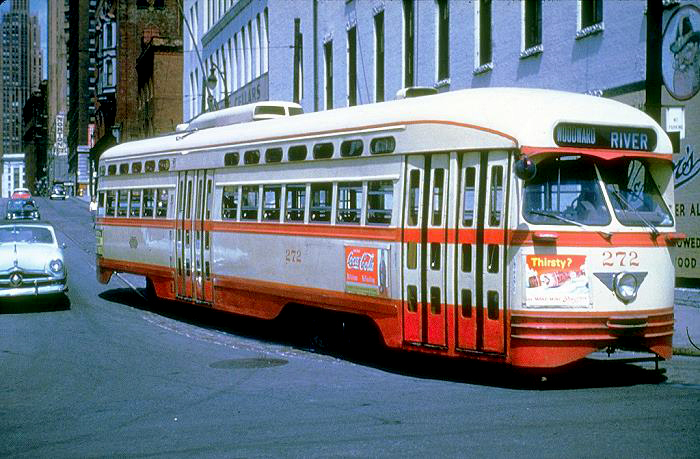
An electric streetcar in Detroit, 1953.

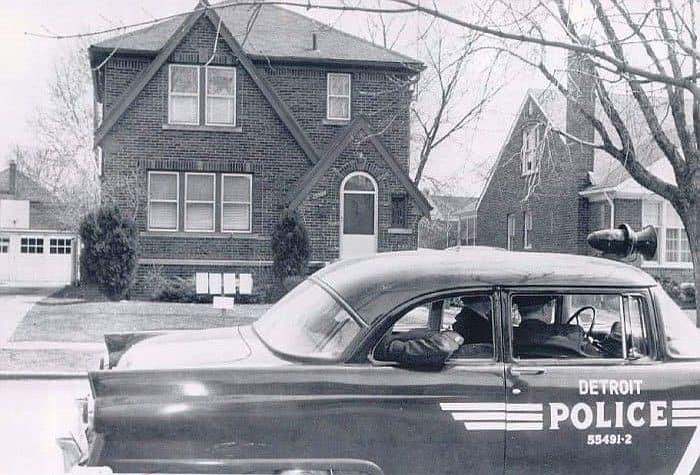
Detroit police cruiser on patrol in 1955.

A documentary film about Zug Island's steel mills in 1950.

Highlight reel of the Detroit Lions' 1954 season.

A cruise to Boblo Island during Detroit's hosting of the Soap Box Derby in 1955.

Other sources indicate the replacement of Detroit's large electric streetcar network with buses and highways was much more controversial. In 1930, Detroit had 30 electric streetcar lines over 534 miles of track. In 1941, a streetcar ran on Woodward Avenue every 60 seconds at peak times. Wartime restrictions on vital war materials such as rubber and gasoline caused particularly heavy use of the streetcar system during the 1940s. However, between the end of the war and 1949, the city discontinued half of its 20 streetcar lines. Five more were discontinued in 1951—three of them switched abruptly to bus lines during a DSR strike. More closings followed until August 1955, when Mayor Albert Cobo, who promoted freeway construction as the way of the future, urged the city council to sell the city's recently purchased fleet of modern streetcars to Mexico City. It was a controversial move. A newspaper poll showed that Detroiters, by a margin of 3-to-1, opposed the switch to buses. Some even jeered the sunken freeways Cobo championed, dubbing them "Cobo canals". "A lot of people were against the decision ... A common complaint was about the sale of the [new] cars, that the city didn't get its money's worth. Of course, the city had an answer for anything." On April 8, 1956, the last streetcar in Detroit rolled down Woodward Avenue. After less than 10 years in service, Detroit's fleet of streamlined streetcars was loaded on railcars and shipped to Mexico City, where they ran for another 30 years.

The Hudson's department store, the second largest in the nation, realized that the limited parking space at its downtown skyscraper would increasingly be a problem for its customers. The solution in 1954 was to open the Northland Center in nearby Southfield, just beyond the city limits. It was the largest suburban shopping center in the world and quickly became the main shopping destination for northern and western Detroit, and for much of the suburbs. By 1961, the downtown skyscraper accounted for only half of Hudson's sales; it closed in 1986. The Hudson's name would later be discarded all together. The remaining Hudsons were first rebranded as branches of Chicago's flagship Marshall Field's State Street, and later rebranded again as branches of New York City's flagship Macy's Herald Square.

Ethnic whites enjoyed high wages and suburban life styles. Blacks comprised 4% of the auto labor force in 1942, 15% by the war's end; they held their own and were at 16% by 1960. They started in unskilled jobs, making them susceptible to layoffs and to replacement when automation came. The powerful United Auto Workers union championed state and federal civil rights legislation, but was in no hurry to advance blacks in the union hierarchy. A large well-paid middle class black community emerged; like their white counterparts, they wanted to own single family homes, fought for respectability, and left the blight and crime of the slums as fast as possible for outlying districts and suburbs.

By 1945, Detroit was running out of space for new factories; tight-knit home-owning neighborhoods rejected the notion of tearing out housing to make room for factories. There was plenty of space in the suburbs, and that is where the factories had to locate. The proposals of liberal UAW leaders such as Walter Reuther for urban redevelopment did not please the UAW's largely white, conservative membership. The members repeatedly voted for conservative mayoral candidates, such as Republicans Albert Cobo (mayor 1950–57) and Louis Miriani (mayor 1957–62), for they protected white neighborhoods from residential integration. Home ownership was not just a very large financial investment for individuals, it was also a source of identity for men who remembered the hardships and foreclosures of the Great Depression. Sugrue says, "Economically vulnerable homeowners feared, above all, that an influx of blacks would imperil their precarious investments."

1957 documentary about Detroit's banks

1957 documentary about Detroit's Kowalski Sausage

1959 documentary about The Spirit of Detroit statue

As mayor in 1957–1962, Louis Miriani was best known for completing many of the large-scale urban renewal projects initiated by the Cobo administration. These were largely financed by federal money, due to his rejection of implementing a city tax. Miriani also took strong measures to overcome the growing crime rate in Detroit. The United Automobile Workers (UAW), then at the height of its size and power, officially endorsed Miriani for re-election, stressing what they viewed as his conservative "law and order" position. However, while some African Americans praised Miriani for helping to break down racial divides, other disagreed with the UAW that Miriani did enough.

Historian David Maraniss cites milestones from 1962 to 1964 that marked the city's sharp decline: the failure of a plan to host the Olympics; urban renewal uprooting black neighborhoods; urgently needed police reforms that stalled; and the failure to transform Detroit through the Model Cities and war on poverty programs. Tensions started building that exploded in the 1967 riot, the most costly and violent in the country during a summer of numerous riots in various North American cities.

The 1970s brought a worldwide energy crisis with high gasoline prices. For the first time, the American industry faced serious competition from imported automobiles, which were smaller and more fuel-efficient. German Volkswagens and Japanese Toyotas posed a growing threat.

=== Civil rights and the Great Society ===
In June 1963, Rev. Martin Luther King Jr. gave a major speech in Detroit that foreshadowed his "I Have a Dream" speech two months later. In Detroit, King was accompanied by Rev. C. L. Franklin. Detroit played a major role in the civil rights movement of the 1960s; the Model Cities Program was a key component of President Lyndon B. Johnson's Great Society and War on Poverty. Begun in 1966, it operated five-year-long experiments in 150 cities to develop new anti-poverty programs and alternative forms of municipal government. The ambitious federal urban aid program succeeded in fostering a new generation of mostly black urban leaders.

Detroit had one of the larger Model Cities projects. It promised a great deal and delivered much less, as Detroit suffered from the unintended consequences. Mayor Jerome Cavanagh (Mayor 1962–69) was the only elected official to serve on Johnson's task force. Detroit received widespread acclaim for its leadership in the program, which used $490 million to try to turn a nine-square-mile section of the city (with 134,000 inhabitants) into a model city. The city's political and business elite, and city planners, along with the black middle class, wanted the federal funding to assist the economic growth of the entire city. They sought to protect the central business district property values from nearby slums and to construct new revenue-generating structures. But, local community organizers and civil rights activists rallied poor residents in opposition to these plans. They said federal renewal funding should be used to replace deteriorating housing stock, whether with new public housing or low-cost housing built by private developers. The Model Cities Program was terminated in Detroit (and nationwide) in 1974 after major race riots in the late 1960s in most of its target cities.

Detroit witnessed growing confrontations between the mostly white police force and inner city blacks, culminating in the massive 12th Street riot in July 1967. The riot erupted in mostly black neighborhoods. Governor George W. Romney ordered the Michigan National Guard into Detroit, and President Johnson sent in U.S. Army troops. The result was 43 dead, 467 injured, over 7,200 arrests, and more than 2,000 buildings destroyed. Thousands of small businesses closed permanently or relocated to safer neighborhoods, and the affected district lay in ruins for decades.

Coleman Young, Detroit's first black mayor, explained the long-term effects of the riot:

The heaviest casualty, however, was the city. Detroit's losses went a hell of a lot deeper than the immediate toll of lives and buildings. The riot put Detroit on the fast track to economic desolation, mugging the city and making off with incalculable value in jobs, earnings taxes, corporate taxes, retail dollars, sales taxes, mortgages, interest, property taxes, development dollars, investment dollars, tourism dollars, and plain damn money. The money was carried out in the pockets of the businesses and the white people who fled as fast as they could. The white exodus from Detroit had been prodigiously steady prior to the riot, totally twenty-two thousand in 1966, but afterwards it was frantic. In 1967, with less than half the year remaining after the summer explosion—the outward population migration reached sixty-seven thousand. In 1968 the figure hit eighty-thousand, followed by forty-six thousand in 1969.

Scholars have produced many studies documenting the fall of Detroit from one of the world's premier industrial cities in 1945 to a much smaller, weaker city in the 21st century, struggling to survive against the loss of industry and population, against crime, corruption and poverty. Boyle also blames the big corporations. He summarizes the scholarly consensus in 2001:

Detroit was betrayed by a lack of political vision, torn asunder by racial conflict, and devastated by deindustrialization. Detroit's problems peaked in the late 1960s and the 1970s. Since then the city has struggled to recover, to build a new economy and a new polity. However noble the goals, though, these efforts have failed to reverse Detroit's deterioration. Motown remains in the grip of the crisis that began fifty years ago.

==== Milliken v. Bradley ====
On August 18, 1970, the NAACP filed suit against Michigan state officials, including Governor William Milliken, charging de facto public school segregation. The trial began April 6, 1971, and lasted 41 days. The NAACP argued that although schools were not legally segregated, the city of Detroit and its surrounding counties had enacted policies to maintain racial segregation in public schools. The NAACP also suggested a direct relationship between unfair housing practices (such as redlining of certain neighborhoods) and educational segregation, which followed segregated neighborhoods. District Judge Steven J. Roth held all levels of government accountable for the segregation in his ruling on Milliken v. Bradley. The Sixth Circuit Court affirmed some of the decision, withholding judgment on the relationship of housing inequality with education. The court specified that it was the state's responsibility to integrate across the segregated metropolitan area.

The governor and other accused officials appealed the decision to the U.S. Supreme Court, which took up the case February 27, 1974. The subsequent Milliken v. Bradley decision had wide national influence. In a narrow decision, the Court found that schools were a subject of local control and that suburbs could not be forced to solve problems in the city's school district. According to Gary Orfield and Susan E. Eaton in their 1996 book Dismantling Desegregation, the "Supreme Court's failure to examine the housing underpinnings of metropolitan segregation" in Milliken made desegregation "almost impossible" in northern metropolitan areas. "Suburbs were protected from desegregation by the courts ignoring the origin of their racially segregated housing patterns." "Milliken was perhaps the greatest missed opportunity of that period", said Myron Orfield, professor of law and director of the Institute on Metropolitan Opportunity at the University of Minnesota. "Had that gone the other way, it would have opened the door to fixing nearly all of Detroit's current problems."

John Mogk, a professor of law and an expert in urban planning at Wayne State University in Detroit, says, "Everybody thinks that it was the riots [in 1967] that caused the white families to leave. Some people were leaving at that time but, really, it was after Milliken that you saw mass flight to the suburbs. If the case had gone the other way, it is likely that Detroit would not have experienced the steep decline in its tax base that has occurred since then."

Supreme Justice William O. Douglas' dissenting opinion in Miliken held that

there is, so far as the school cases go, no constitutional difference between de facto and de jure segregation. Each school board performs state action for Fourteenth Amendment purposes when it draws the lines that confine it to a given area, when it builds schools at particular sites, or when it allocates students. The creation of the school districts in Metropolitan Detroit either maintained existing segregation or caused additional segregation. Restrictive covenants maintained by state action or inaction build black ghettos ... the task of equity is to provide a unitary system for the affected area where, as here, the State washes its hands of its own creations.

=== 1970s and 1980s ===
While 55 percent of Detroiters were counted as white in the 1970 census, by 1980 the city's proportion of white residents had declined to 34 percent of the population. The population shift was even more stark considering that Detroit was 83 percent white at the time of the city's all-time population high in 1950. The migration of whites to the suburbs left blacks in control of a city suffering from an inadequate tax base, and too few jobs. According to Chafets, "Among the nation's major cities, Detroit was at or near the top of unemployment, poverty per capita, and infant mortality throughout the 1980s."

In the 1973 mayoral election the polarization was nearly total, as 92% of blacks voted for Coleman Young, while 91% of the whites voted for former police Commissioner John Nichols, although neither appealed to racial issues during the campaign. Although Young had emerged from the far left element in Detroit, he moved to the right after his election. He called an ideological truce and won the support of Detroit's economic elite. The new mayor was energetic in the construction of the Joe Louis Arena, and upgrading the city's mediocre mass transit system. Highly controversial was his using eminent domain to purchase and raze a 465-acre inner-city neighborhood known as Poletown that was home to 3,500 people, mostly Polish property owners, in order to make way for a half-billion-dollar General Motors Cadillac assembly plant. Rich argues that he pulled money out of the neighborhood to rehabilitate the downtown business district, because "there were no other options." Young tried to rein in the city's largely white police department, and its aggressive tactics angered black voters.

Young was an outspoken advocate for federal funding for Detroit construction projects, and his administration saw the completion of the Renaissance Center, Detroit People Mover, and several other Detroit landmarks. During Young's last two terms there he faced angry opposition from neighborhood activists. He usually prevailed, winning re-election by wide margins in 1977, 1981, 1985, and 1989, for a total of 20 years as mayor, based largely on black votes.

On August 16, 1987, Northwest Airlines Flight 255 crashed near Detroit, killing all but one of the 155 people on board, as well as two people on the ground.

==== Crime ====
Young was blamed for failing to stem the crime epidemic that Detroit became notorious for in the 1970s and 1980s. Dozens of violent black street gangs gained control of the city's large drug trade, which began with the heroin epidemic of the 1970s and grew into the even larger crack cocaine epidemic of the 1980s and early 1990s. There were numerous major criminal gangs that were founded in Detroit and dominated the drug trade at various times; most were short-lived. They included The Errol Flynns (east side), Nasty Flynns (later the NF Bangers) and Black Killers and the drug consortiums of the 1980s such as Young Boys Inc., Pony Down, Best Friends, Black Mafia Family and the Chambers Brothers. The Young Boys were innovative, opening franchises in other cities, using youth too young to be prosecuted, promoting brand names, and unleashing extreme brutality to frighten away rivals.

In June 1971, eight African-Americans were found shot dead in a house on Hazelwood Street, the worst mass killing in Detroit's history.

Several times during Young's tenure Detroit was named the arson capital of the U.S., and repeatedly the murder capital of the United States. Often Detroit was listed by FBI crime statistics as the "most dangerous city in America" during his administration. Crime rates in Detroit peaked in 1991 at more than 2,700 violent crimes per 100,000 people.

Crime continued to be a problem in Detroit long after Young's tenure as mayor ended. The arson rate in Detroit was 6.3 times the national average in 2003 and the murder rate was 5.1 times the national average. The majority of Detroit residents, including many Blacks, have left the city, leaving a glut of abandoned buildings that have become magnets for drugs, arson, and other crime.

The night of October 30, the night before Halloween, was a traditional day for pranks but became known as "Devil's Night" as Detroit youth went on a rampage in the 1980s. A tradition of light-hearted minor vandalism, such as soaping windows, had emerged in the 1930s, but by the 1980s it had become, said Mayor Coleman, "a vision from hell." The arson primarily took place in the inner city, but surrounding suburbs were often affected as well. The crimes became increasingly more destructive.

Over 800 fires were set in the peak year 1984, overwhelming the city's fire department. Hundreds of vacant homes across the city were set ablaze by arsonists. The fires continued to happen but the number was sharply reduced by razing thousands of abandoned houses that often were used to sell drugs as well, namely 5,000 in 1989-90 alone. Every year the city mobilizes "Angel's Night", with tens of thousands of volunteers patrolling areas at high risk.

== Decline of Detroit ==
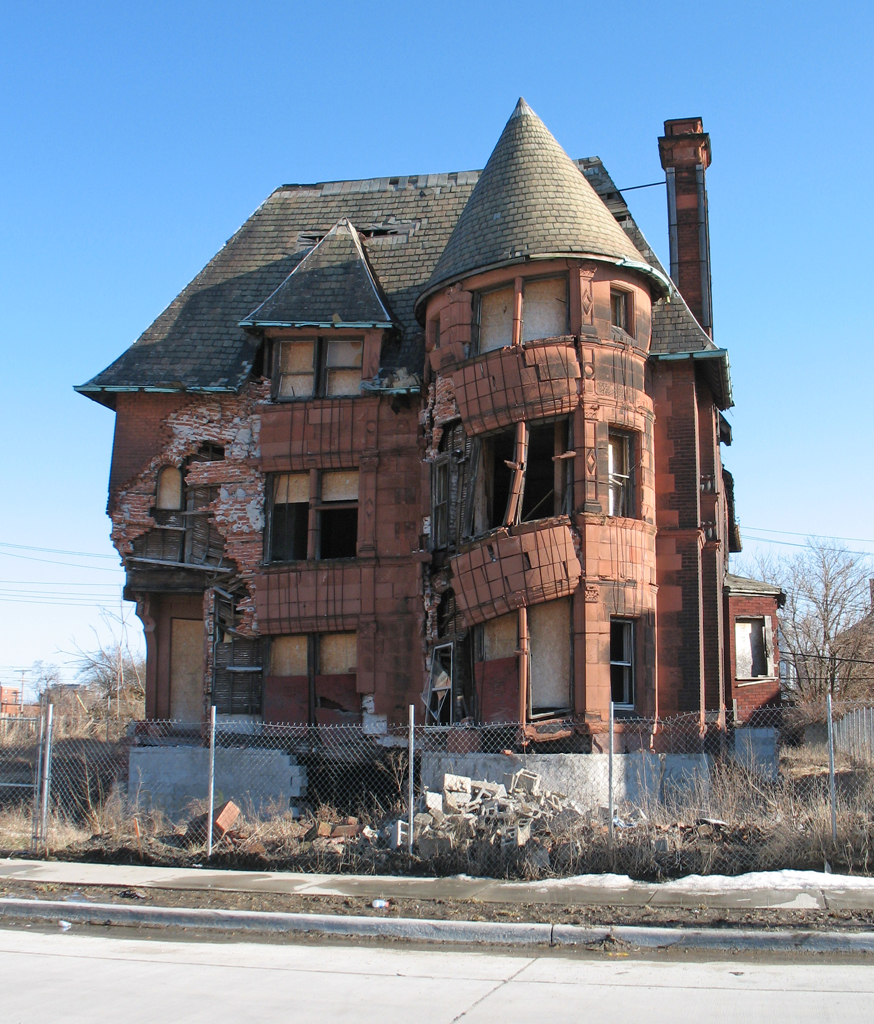
The William Livingstone House in Brush Park, became a symbol of Detroit's urban decay, 2007.

Detroit went through a major economic and demographic decline in the second half of the 20th century. The population of the city fell from a high of 1,850,000 in 1950 to 680,000 in 2015, removing it from the top 20 of US cities by population for the first time since 1850. Local crime rates were among the highest in the United States (even though the overall crime rate in the city saw a decline during the 21st century), and vast areas of the city were in a state of severe urban decay. In 2013, Detroit filed the largest municipal bankruptcy case in U.S. history, which it successfully exited on December 10, 2014.

As of 2017, the median household income was rising, and criminal activity was decreasing by 5% annually as of 2017.

== Metropolitan region ==
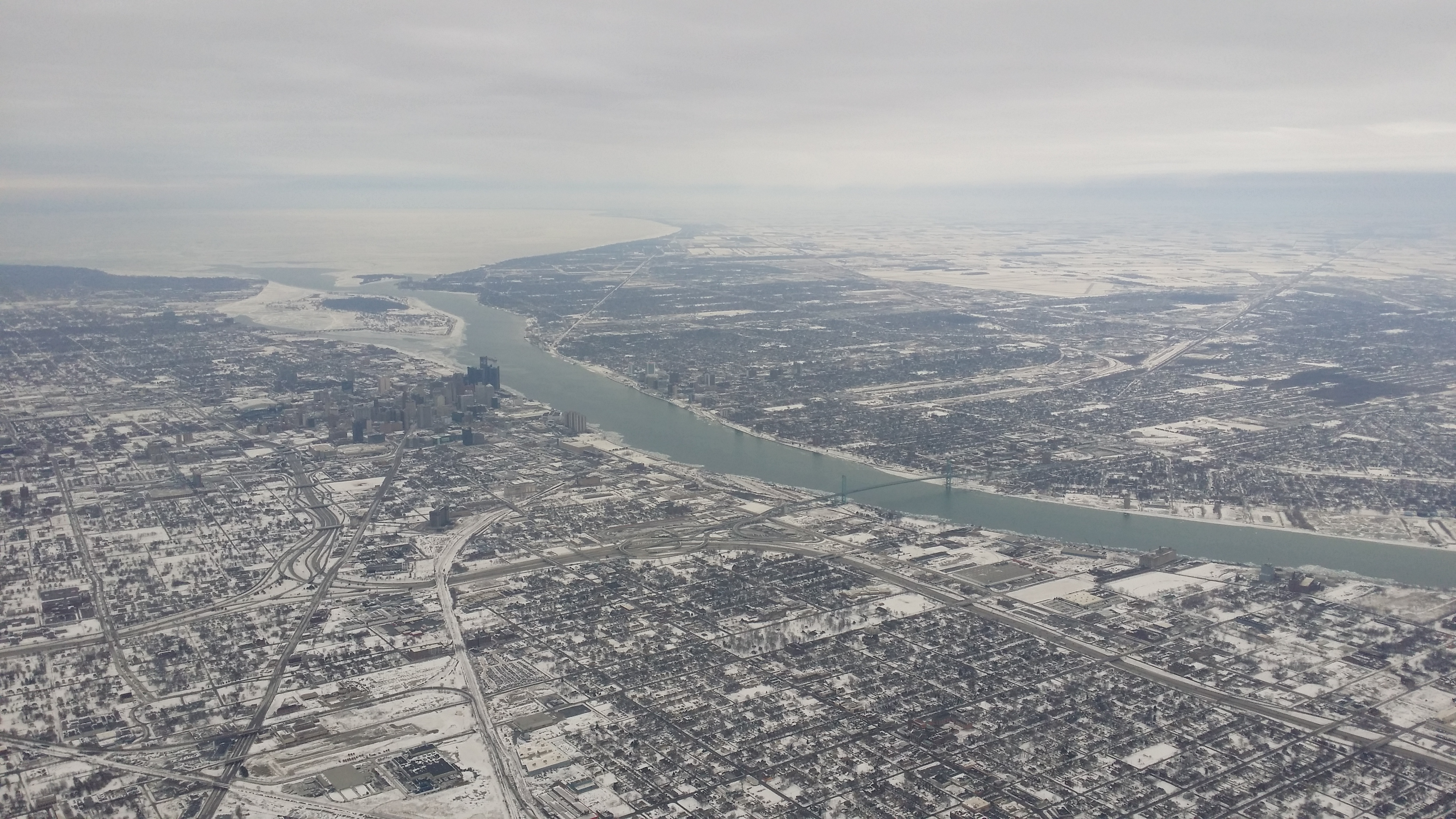
Aerial photo of Detroit taken on January 11, 2015

The Detroit area emerged as a major metropolitan region with the construction of an extensive freeway system in the 1950s and 1960s, which expanded in the ensuing decades. The 1950s, 60s, and 70s witnessed an expansion of the cultural phenomenon of U.S. muscle cars, including Camaro, Mustang, and Charger. Automotive designers and business executives such as Bill Mitchell, Lee Iacocca, and John DeLorean rose to prominence for their contributions. Freeways facilitated movement throughout the region, with millions residing in the suburbs. A desire for newer housing and schools accelerated migration from the city to the suburbs. Commensurate with the population shift and jobs to its suburbs, the city has had to adjust its role within the larger metropolitan area. Downtown Detroit has seen a resurgence in the 21st century as a business center and entertainment hub, with three casino resort hotels opening. In 1940, Detroit held about one-third of the state's population, while the metropolitan region currently has roughly one-half of the state's population. For the 2010 census, the city of Detroit's population was 713,777, while metropolitan Detroit's combined statistical area had a population of 5,218,852. The city completed significant revitalizations through the 1990s and the first decade of the 21st century. Immigration continues to play a role in the region's projected growth, with the population of Detroit-Ann Arbor-Flint (CMSA) estimated to be estimated to be 6,191,000 by 2025.

== 21st century ==
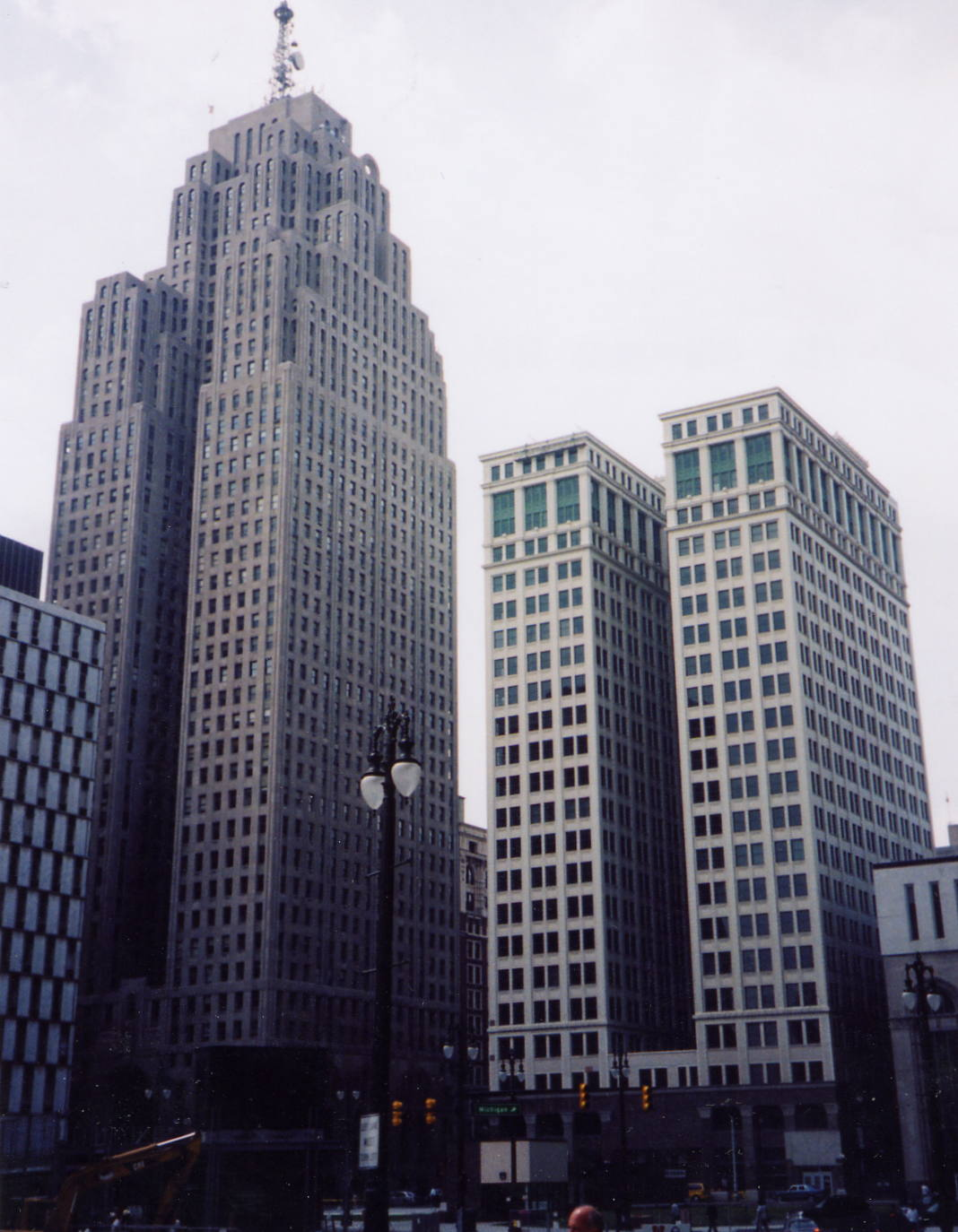
Penobscot Building and the Dime Building in 2005

In the late 1980s and early 1990s, the city began to experience a revival, much of it centered in Downtown, Midtown, and New Center. After purchasing and renovating the historic Fox Theatre and Fox Office Centre in 1987, Mike Ilitch and Marian Ilitch moved Little Caesars Pizza's headquarters to Downtown Detroit. One Detroit Center (1993) arose on the city skyline. Newer downtown residents are predominantly young professionals. The city has three casino resort hotels—MGM Grand Detroit, MotorCity Casino, and Hollywood Casino—with one of the larger gaming industry markets in the U.S. New downtown stadiums Comerica Park and Ford Field were constructed for the Detroit Tigers and Detroit Lions in 2000 and 2002, respectively; this placed the Lions' stadium in the city proper for the first time since 1974. Opened in 2017, Little Caesars Arena allows the Detroit Red Wings and Detroit Pistons to have a shared home, thus locating the Pistons' in the city proper for the first time since 1978, also making Detroit the only North American city to have all major professional sports based in its downtown. In 2008, the city witnessed grand restorations of the historic Book Cadillac Hotel and the Fort Shelby Hotel. The city has hosted major sporting events—the 2005 MLB All-Star Game, 2006 Super Bowl XL, 2006 World Series, WrestleMania 23 in 2007 and the NCAA Final Four in April 2009—all of which prompted many improvements to the area.

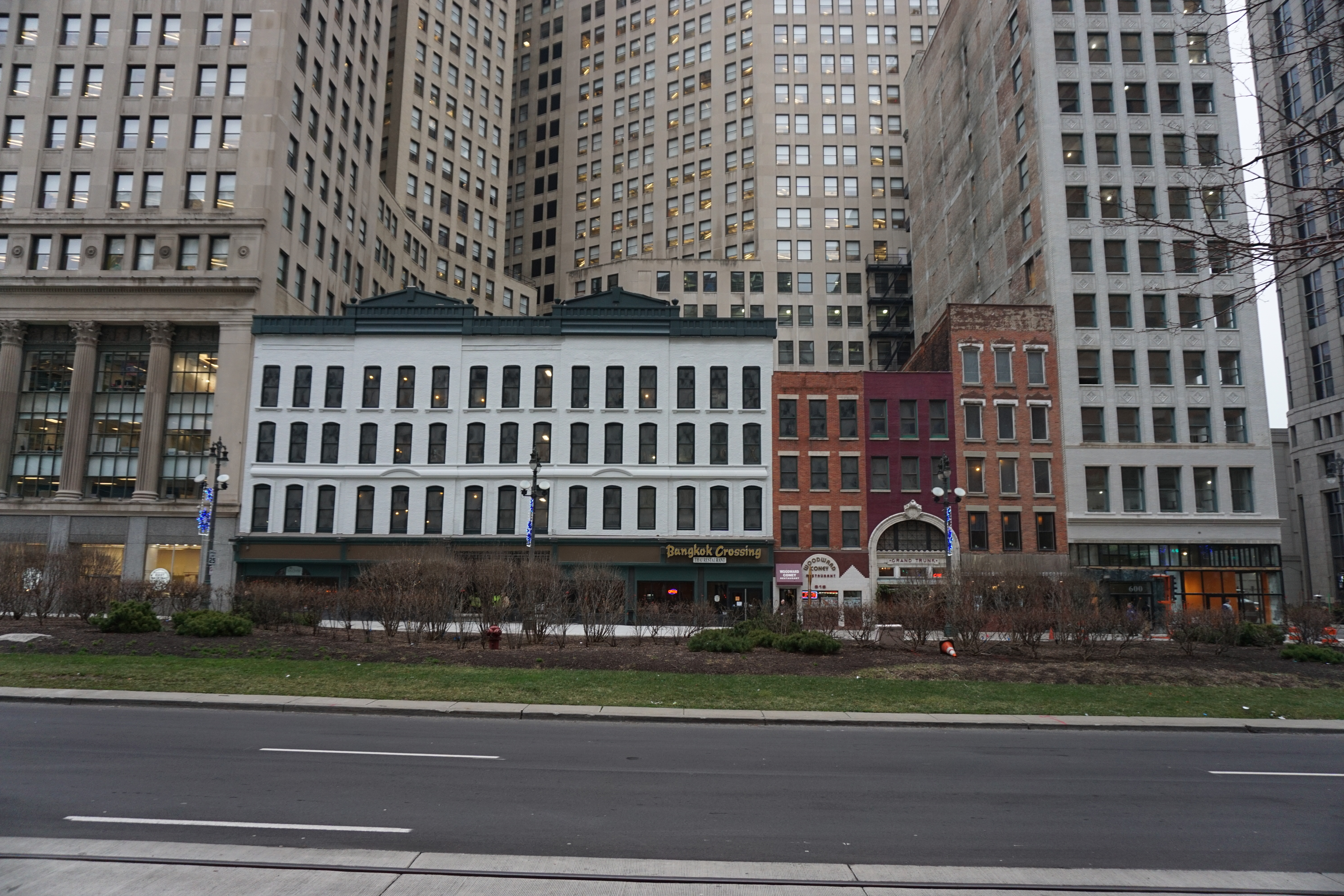
Woodward Avenue

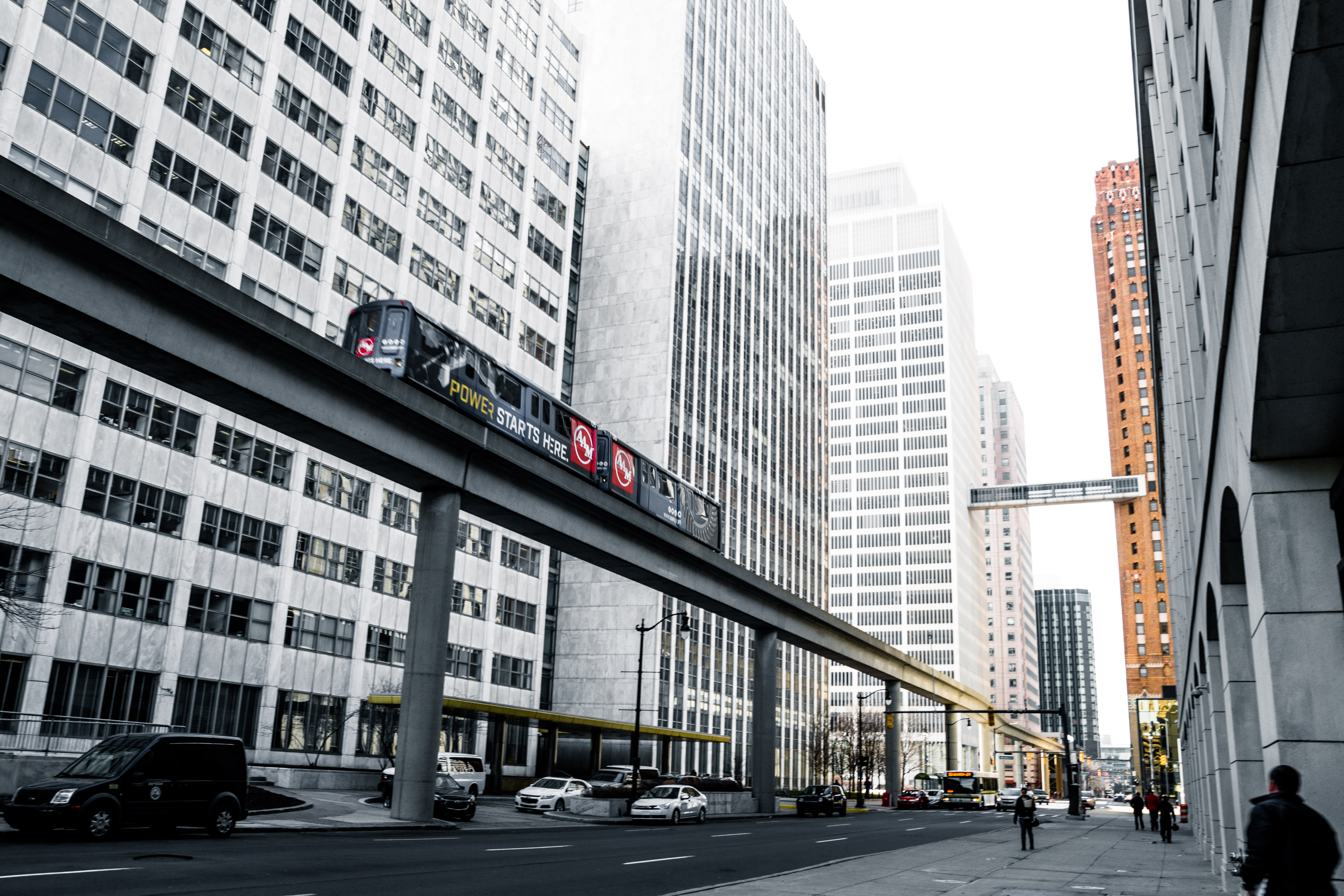
Larned street

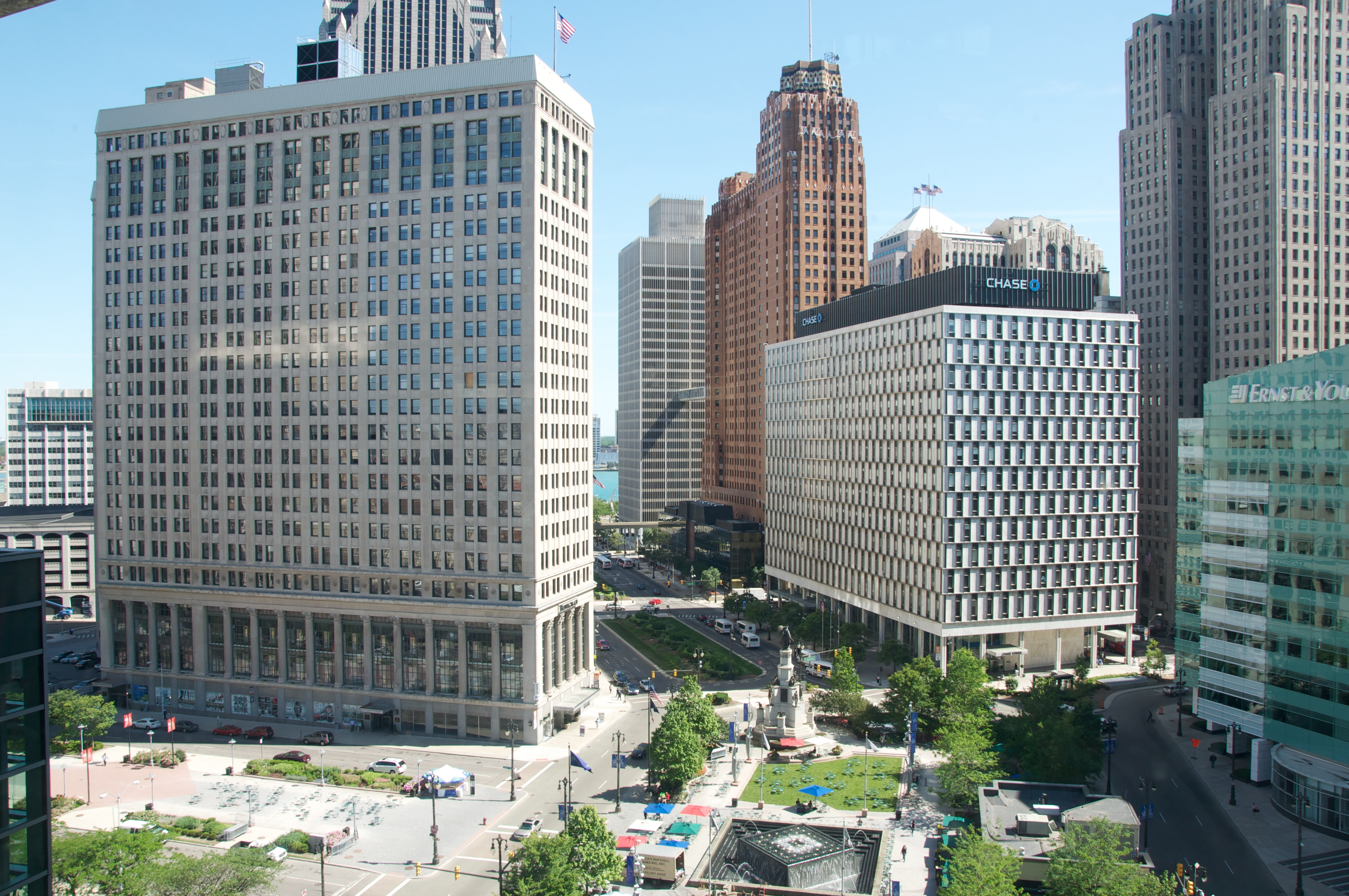
Campus Martius Park, 2012

The city's International Riverfront is a focus of much development, which has complemented similar developments in Windsor, Ontario. In 2007, Detroit completed the first major portions of the River Walk, including miles of parks and fountains. The Renaissance Center received a major renovation in 2004. New developments and revitalizations are a mainstay in the city's plan to enhance its economy through tourism. Along the river, upscale condominiums are rising, such as Watermark Detroit. Some city limit signs, particularly on the Dearborn border, say "Welcome to Detroit, The Renaissance City Founded 1701".

Campus Martius, a reconfiguration of downtown's main intersection as a new park, was opened in 2004. The park has been cited as one of the best public spaces in the United States. In 2001, the first portion of the International Riverfront redevelopment was completed as a part of the city's 300th-anniversary celebration.

In 2004, Compuware established its world headquarters in downtown Detroit followed by Quicken Loans in 2010. Significant landmarks such as the Fox Theatre, Orchestra Hall Detroit Opera House, and the Gem Theater have been restored and host concerts, musicals, and plays. The Detroit Institute of Arts completed a major renovation and expansion in 2007. Many downtown centers, such as Greektown, Cobo Center and Campus Martius Park, draw patrons and host activities.

In September 2008, Mayor Kwame Kilpatrick (who had served for six years) resigned following felony convictions. In 2013, Kilpatrick was convicted on 24 federal felony counts, including mail fraud, wire fraud, and racketeering, and was sentenced to 28 years in federal prison. The former mayor's activities cost the city an estimated $20 million. Roughly half of the owners of Detroit's 305,000 properties failed to pay their 2011 tax bills, resulting in about $246 million (~$347 million in 2025) in taxes and fees going uncollected, nearly half of which was due to Detroit. The rest of the money would have been earmarked for Wayne County, Detroit Public Schools, and the library system.

In July 2013, Michigan state-appointed emergency manager Kevyn Orr asked a federal judge to place the City of Detroit into bankruptcy protection.

In March 2014, the indebted Detroit Water and Sewerage Department began cutting off water to customers' homes with unpaid bills over $150 or if the payment was over 60 days overdue. As of July 15, more than 15,000 homes had been cut off.

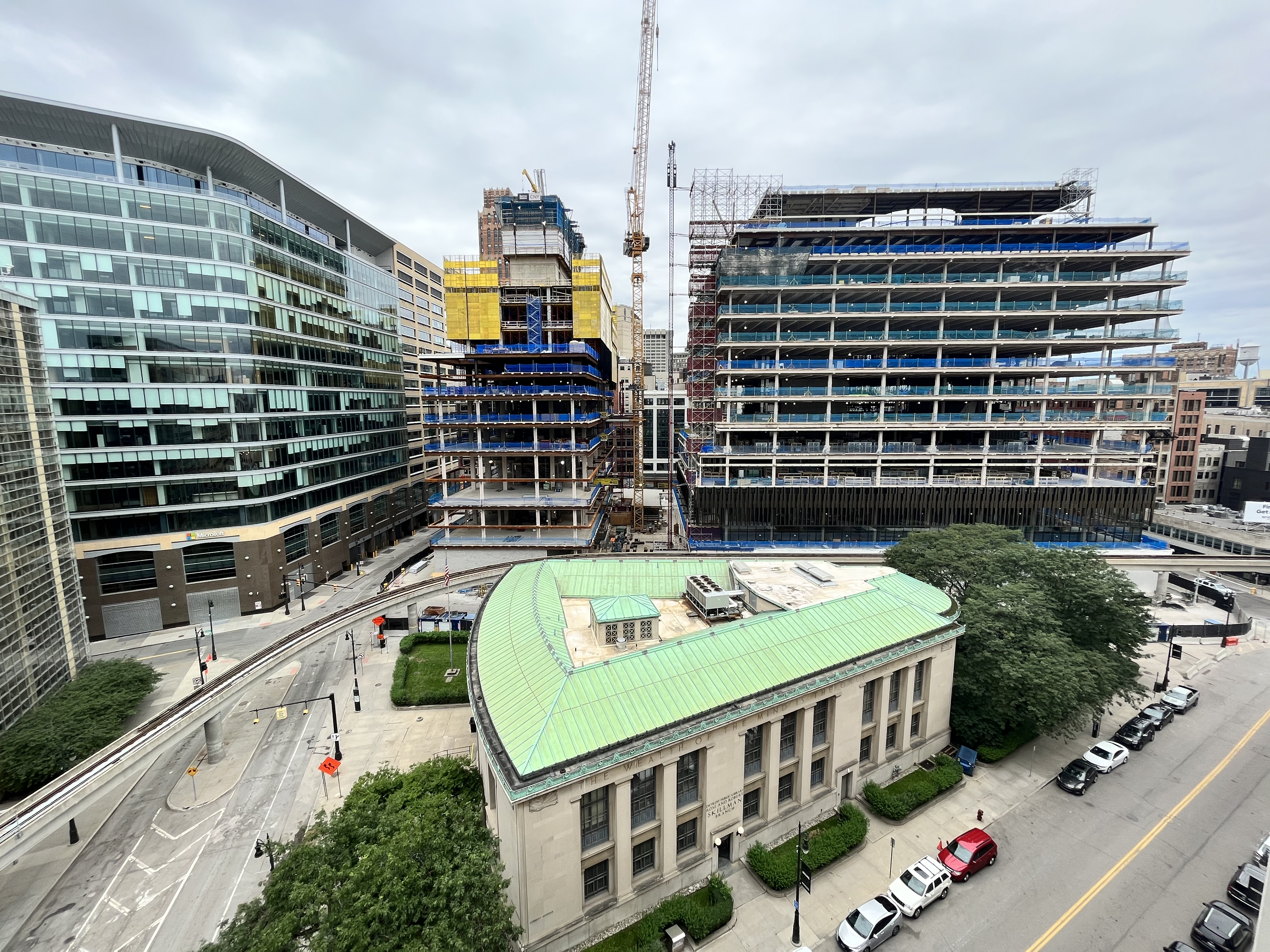
Construction progress at Hudson's Detroit in 2022, slated to be the second tallest building in Detroit.

The city's financial crisis resulted in Michigan taking over administrative control of its government. Governor Rick Snyder declared a financial emergency in March 2013, stating the city had a $327 million budget deficit and faced more than $14 billion in long-term debt. It had been making ends meet on a month-to-month basis with the help of bond money held in a state escrow account and had instituted mandatory unpaid days off for many city workers. Those troubles, along with underfunded city services, such as police and fire departments, and ineffective turnaround plans from Mayor Bing and the City Council led the state of Michigan to appoint an emergency manager for Detroit. On June 14, 2013, Detroit defaulted on $2.5 billion of debt by withholding $39.7 million in interest payments, while Emergency Manager Kevyn Orr met with bondholders and other creditors in an attempt to restructure the city's $18.5 billion debt and avoid bankruptcy. On July 18, 2013, Detroit became the largest U.S. city to file for bankruptcy. It was declared bankrupt by U.S. District Court on December 3, with its $18.5 billion debt. On November 7, 2014, the city's plan for exiting bankruptcy was approved. On December 11 the city officially exited bankruptcy. The plan allowed the city to eliminate $7 billion in debt and invest $1.7 billion into improved city services.

One way the city obtained this money was through the Detroit Institute of Arts (DIA). Holding over 60,000 pieces of art worth billions of dollars, some saw it as the key to funding this investment. The city came up with a plan to monetize the art and sell it, leading to the DIA becoming a private organization. After months of legal battles, the city finally got hundreds of millions of dollars towards funding a new Detroit.

=== 2010s and revitalization ===
One of the largest post-bankruptcy efforts to improve city services has been to fix the city's broken street lighting system. At one time it was estimated that 40% of lights were not working, which resulted in public safety issues and abandonment of housing. The plan called for replacing outdated high-pressure sodium lights with 65,000 LED lights. Construction began in late 2014 and finished in December 2016; Detroit is the largest U.S. city with all LED street lighting.

In the 2010s, several initiatives were taken by Detroit's citizens and new residents to improve the cityscape by renovating and revitalizing neighborhoods. Such projects include volunteer renovation groups and various urban gardening movements. Miles of associated parks and landscaping have been completed in recent years. In 2011, the Port Authority Passenger Terminal opened, with the riverwalk connecting Hart Plaza to the Renaissance Center.

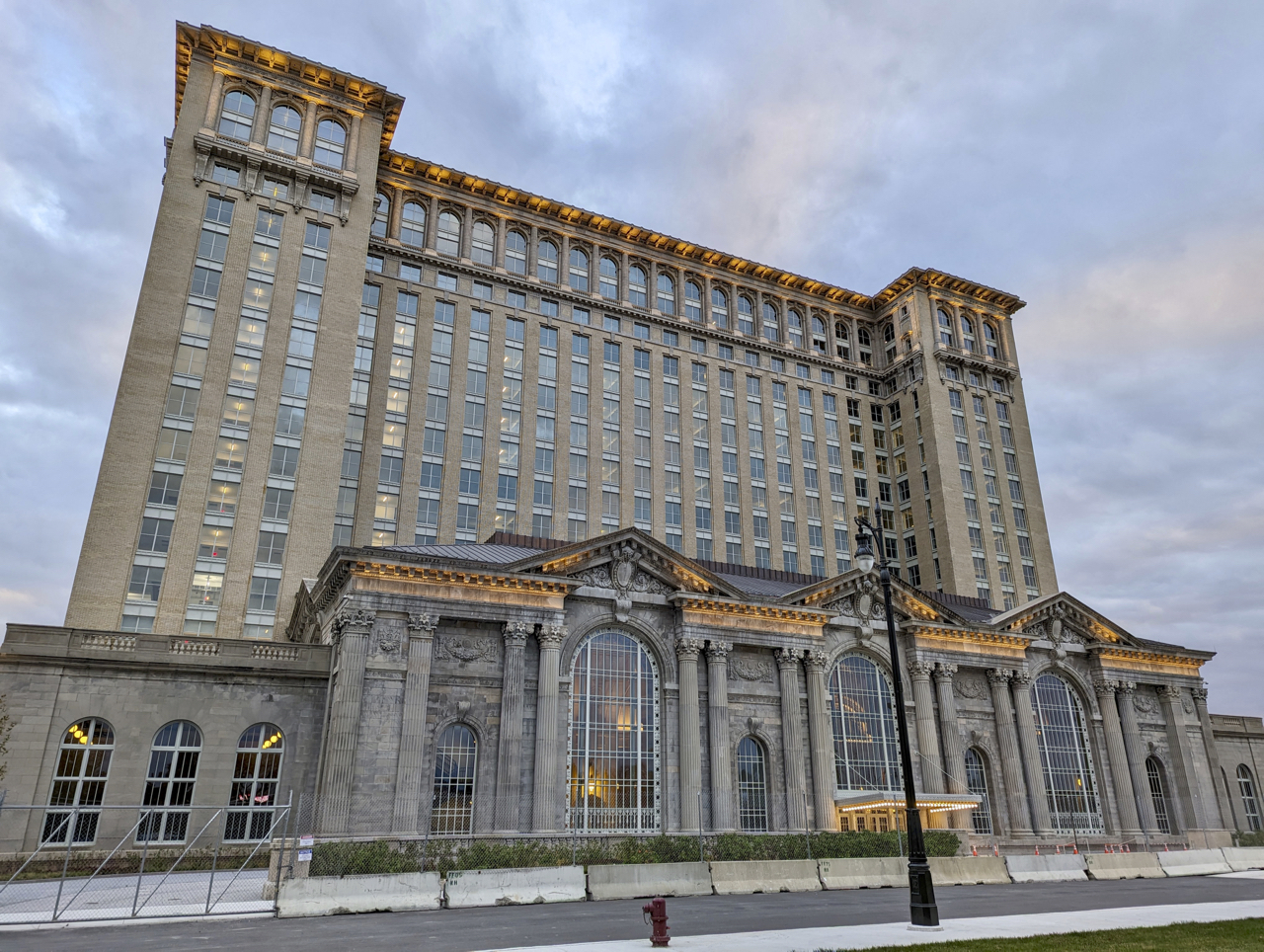
Michigan Central Station, once symbolic of the city's decline, was redeveloped by Ford Motor Company and reopened in 2024.

One symbol of the city's decades-long decline, the Michigan Central Station, was long vacant. The city renovated it with new windows, elevators and facilities, completing the work in December 2015. In 2018, Ford Motor Company purchased the building and plans to use it for mobility testing with a potential return of train service. Several other landmark buildings have been privately renovated and adapted as condominiums, hotels, offices, or for cultural uses. Detroit was mentioned as a city of renaissance and has reversed many of the trends of the prior decades.

The city has seen a rise in gentrification. In downtown, for example, the construction of Little Caesars Arena brought with it high class shops and restaurants along Woodward Avenue. Office tower and condominium construction has led to an influx of wealthy families but also a displacement of long-time residents and culture. Areas outside of downtown and other recently revived areas have an average household income of about 25% less than the gentrified areas, a gap that is continuing to grow. Rents and cost of living in these gentrified areas rise every year, pushing minorities and the poor out, causing more and more racial disparity and separation in the city. In 2019, the cost of a one-bedroom loft in Rivertown reached $300,000 (~$372,129 in 2025), with a five-year sale price change of over 500% and average income rising by 18%.

== Timeline ==
Historical populations
Census	City	Metro	Region
1810	1,650	N/A	N/A
1820	1,422	N/A	N/A
1830	2,222	N/A	N/A
1840	9,102	N/A	N/A
1850	21,019	N/A	N/A
1860	45,619	N/A	N/A
1870	79,577	N/A	N/A
1880	116,340	N/A	N/A
1890	205,877	N/A	N/A
1900	285,704	542,452	664,771
1910	465,766	725,064	867,250
1920	993,678	1,426,704	1,639,006
1930	1,568,662	2,325,739	2,655,395
1940	1,623,452	2,544,287	2,911,681
1950	1,849,568	3,219,256	3,700,490
1960	1,670,144	4,012,607	4,660,480
1970	1,514,063	4,490,902	5,289,766
1980	1,203,368	4,387,783	5,203,269
1990	1,027,974	4,266,654	5,095,695
2000	951,270	4,441,551	5,357,538
2010	713,777	4,296,250	5,218,852
*Estimates; Metro: Metropolitan Statistical Area (MSA); Region: Combined Statistical Area (CSA)

== Keys to the city ==
Numerous people have been awarded the key to the city of Detroit. Some notable recipients include:

- Sammy Davis Jr. – Entertainer (awarded 1961 by Mayor Louis Miriani)
- Stevie Wonder – Motown recording artist (awarded 1974 by Mayor Coleman Young)
- Martha Jean Steinberg – Radio broadcaster and pastor
- Santa Claus – Given annually at the city's Thanksgiving Day Parade
- James Earl Jones – Actor
- Elmo – Sesame Street character
- Benjamin Carson – Neurosurgeon
- Jerome Bettis – Football player (awarded 2006 by Mayor Kwame Kilpatrick)
- Big Sean – Rapper
- Steve Yzerman – Retired ice hockey player (awarded 2007 by Mayor Kwame Kilpatrick)
- Mike Ilitch – Businessman and sports team owner (awarded 2008 by Mayor Kwame Kilpatrick)
- Saddam Hussein – former Iraqi president (awarded 1980 in recognition of large donations to a church)

== See also ==
- Demographic history of Detroit
- Detroit in literature
- History of African Americans in Detroit
- List of films set in Detroit
- List of people from Detroit
- List of songs about Detroit
- List of tallest buildings in Detroit
- Music of Detroit
- Northern Cities Shift
- Rum-running in Windsor, Ontario
- Saginaw Trail
