= Performing arts in Detroit =

Live music and theater in Detroit

The performing arts in Detroit include orchestra, live music, and theater, with more than a dozen performing arts venues. The stages and old time film palaces are generally located along Woodward Avenue, the city's central thoroughfare, in the Downtown, Midtown, and New Center areas. Some additional venues are located in neighborhood areas of the city. Many of the city's significant historic theaters have been revitalized.

== History ==
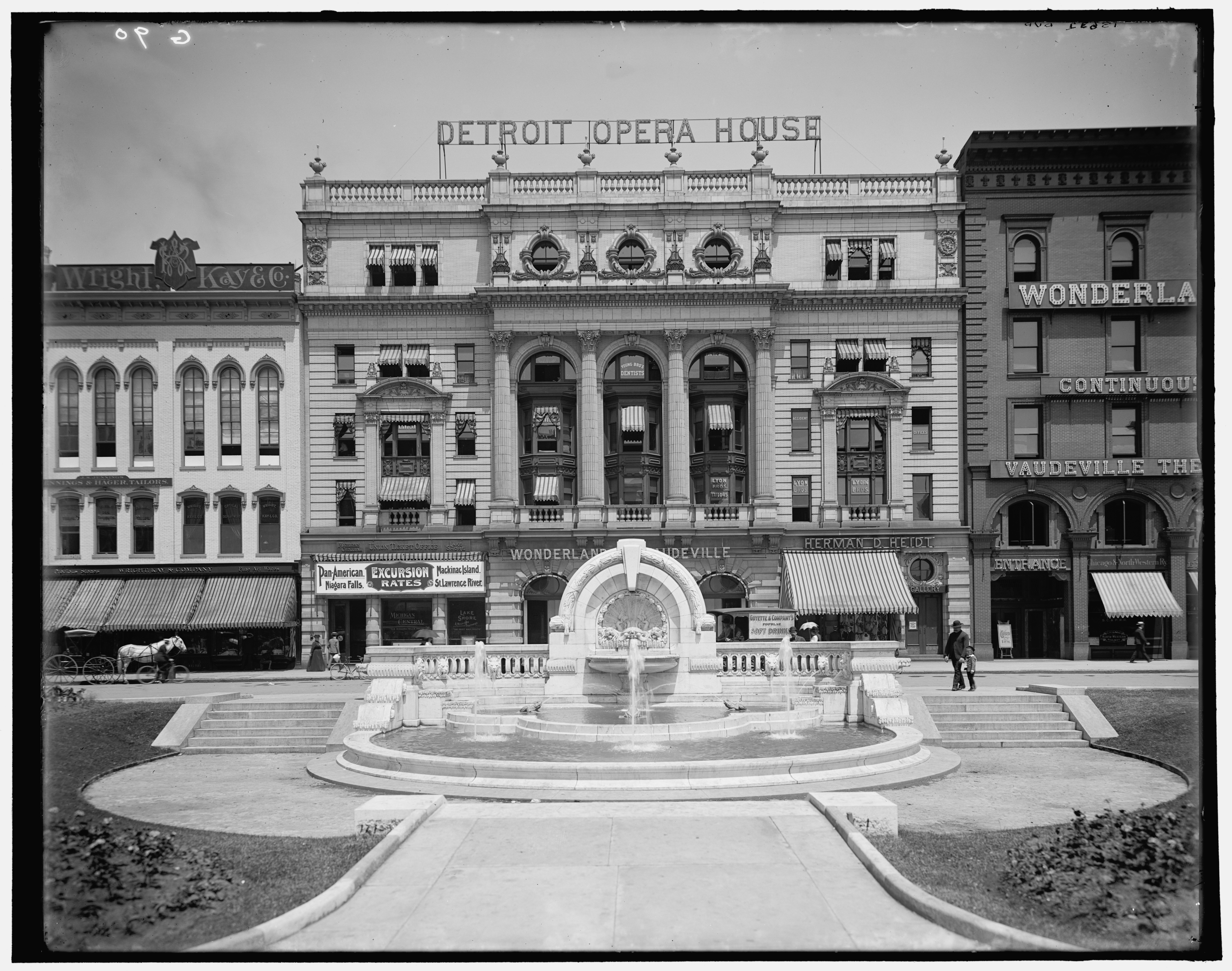
The old Detroit Opera House on Campus Martius in the early 1900s

Detroit has a long theatrical history, with many venues dating back to the 1920s. The Detroit Fox Theatre (1928) was the first theater ever constructed with built-in film sound equipment. Commissioned by William Fox and built by architect C. Howard Crane, the ornate Detroit Fox Theatre was fully restored in 1988. It is the largest of the nation's Fox Theatres with 5,045 seats. The city has been a place for operatic, symphonic, musical and popular acts since the first part of the twentieth century. Portions of Leonard Bernstein's music for West Side Story, produced by Detroit's Nederlander Organization, were composed on the piano that resides in the library at Cranbrook in the Detroit suburb of Bloomfield Hills. David T. Nederlander's career began after purchasing a 99-year lease on the Detroit Opera House. His son, the organization's chairman, James M. Nederlander, also a Detroit native, coproduced over one hundred famous theatrical classics, including West Side Story, Hello, Dolly!, The King and I, and Fiddler on the Roof. Today, the Nederlander Organization operates Detroit's Fisher Theatre, the Detroit Opera House, and several theaters in other major cities on the Broadway theatre circuit. Organizations such as the Mosaic Youth Theatre support the city's theater community.

During the late 1980s the great old motion picture screens and live performance stages began to be restored. The Fox Theatre, Detroit Opera House (formerly the Grand Circus Theatre; Broadway Capitol Theatre; Paramount Theatre; Capital Theatre), and The Fillmore Detroit (formerly the State Theater; Palms Theater) are notable restorations. The Fillmore Detroit is the site of the annual Detroit Music Awards held in April. Other venues were modernized and expanded such as Orchestra Hall, the home of the world-renowned Detroit Symphony Orchestra. Next to the Detroit Opera House is the restored 1,700-seat Music Hall Center for the Performing Arts (1928) at 350 Madison Avenue, designed by William Kapp and developed by Matilda Dodge Wilson. The Detroit Institute of Arts contains the renovated 1,150-seat Detroit Film Theatre. Smaller sites with long histories in the city were preserved by physically moving the entire structure. In a notable preservation, the Gem Theatre and Century Theatre were moved (off their foundation) to a new address across from the Music Hall Center in order to construct Comerica Park. Detroit's 1,571-seat Redford Theatre (1928), with its Japanese motifs, is home to the Motor City Theatre Organ Society (MCTOS).

Along with Wayne State University’s Hilberry Theatre in Midtown, the only graduate repertory theater in the nation, Detroit has enjoyed a resurgence in theatrical productions and attendance. In the 2000s, shows ranging from touring musicals to local theater happen nightly and the theaters have sparked a significant increase in nightlife; hospitality ventures serving the area have increased accordingly. With its sports venues and casinos, the Detroit Theater District has helped revitalized high rise residential areas like those surrounding Grand Circus Park and its nearby Foxtown, Greektown, the Cultural Center and New Center area anchored by the 2,089-seat Fisher Theatre.

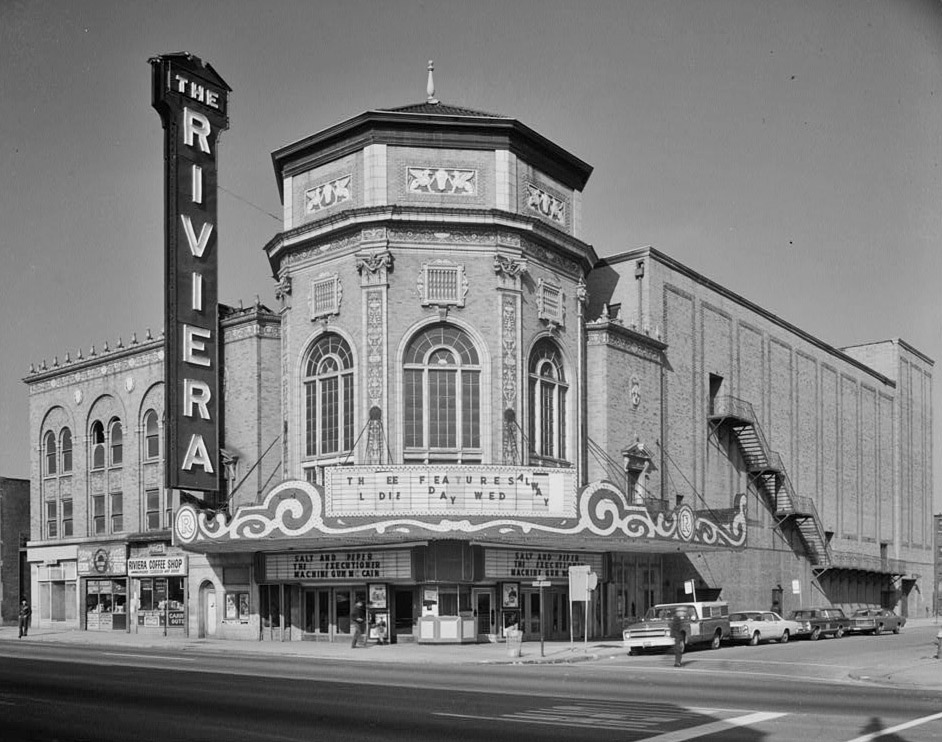
Grand Riviera Theater, a former movie palace located at 9222 Grand River Avenue

The city has some surviving historic theaters which have been converted to other uses while others await redevelopment. Albert Kahn and Ernest Wilby designed the Beaux Arts styled National Theatre (1911) with its Moorish entry at 118 Monroe Street which also awaits redevelopment. The 2,200 seat National Theatre is the oldest surviving theater from the city's first theater district. The futuristic Cadillac Centre begins construction on Detroit's historic Monroe block, once a collection of eight antebellum commercial buildings demolished in 1990. C. Howard Crane designed the Neo-Renaissance styled United Artists Theatre Building at 150 Bagley Street slated to become a residential high rise. The 600-seat Stratford Theatre at 4751 W. Vernor Hwy., designed by Joseph P. Jogerst, seated 1,137 when it opened in 1916. The Art Deco styled Stratford Theatre in the West Vernor-Junction Historic District has operated as a retail store since 1985. The ornate Spanish styled Hollywood Theatre (1927) at the corner of Ferdinand and Fort St. was demolished in 1963. When the historic Hollywood opened, it was the city's second largest with 3,400 seats. The Hollywood Barton theatre organ was saved and awaits restoration. There were over 7,000 such organs installed in American theaters from 1915 to 1933, but fewer than forty remain in their original location such as the Barton theater organ in Ann Arbor's Michigan Theatre.

Detroit's performance centers and theaters emanate from the Grand Circus Park Historic District and continue along Woodward Avenue toward the Fisher Theatre in the city's New Center. The Detroit Opera House is located at Broadway and Grand Circus. The east necklace of downtown links Grand Circus and the stadium area to Greektown along Broadway. The east necklace contains a sub-district sometimes called the Harmonie Park District in the Broadway Avenue Historic District which has taken on the renowned legacy of Detroit's music from the 1930s through the 1950s and into the present. Near the Opera House, and emanating from Grand Circus along the east necklace, are other venues including the Music Hall Center for the Performing Arts and the Gem Theatre and Century Club. The historic Harmonie Club and Harmonie Centre are located along Broadway. The Harmonie Park area ends near Gratiot and Randolph.

== Performing arts venues ==
Name	Image	Built	Location	Capacity	Organization	Style	Architect
Fox Theatre		1928	2211 Woodward Ave. 42°20′18″N 83°3′9″W	5,174	Olympia Entertainment	Neo-Gothic Art Deco facade, Burmese, Chinese	C. Howard Crane
Detroit Masonic Temple Theatre		1922	500 Temple Ave. 42°20′30″N 83°3′37″W	4,404	Olympia Entertainment	Neo-Gothic	George D. Mason
Bert's Warehouse Theatre			2739 Russell St.	3,000	Bert's Entertainment	Bohemian warehouse	
Detroit Opera House		1922	1526 Broadway St.	2,700	Michigan Opera Theater, Nederlander	Italian Renaissance	C. Howard Crane
The Fillmore Detroit		1925	2115 Woodward Ave. 42°20′16″N 83°3′7″W	2,200	Live Nation	Neo-Renaissance	C. Howard Crane
Fisher Theatre		1927	3011 West Grand Blvd. 42°22′8.5″N 83°4′36.92″W	2,089	Nederlander	Art Deco	Albert Kahn
Orchestra Hall		1919	3711 Woodward Ave. 42°20′55″N 83°3′33″W	2,014	Detroit Symphony Orchestra	Neo-Renaissance	C. Howard Crane
Harpos Concert Theatre		1939	1315 Broadway St.	1,975	Wisper & Wetsman	Art moderne	Charles N. Agree
MotorCity Casino Theatre		2007	2901 Grand River Ave.	1,800		Novelty, Modern	Giffels Inc., NORR Limited
Wilson Theatre		1928	350 Madison Ave. 42°20′14″N 83°2′46″W	1,700	Kresge Foundation	Art Deco facade, Spanish Renaissance	William E. Kapp, Smith, Hinchman & Grylls
Redford Theatre		1928	17354 Lahser Ave. 42°25′2″N 83°15′27″W	1,571	Motor City Theater Organ Society	Exotic Revival, Japanese motifs	Ralph F. Shreive with Verner, Wilheim, and Molby
Majestic Theatre		1915	4140 Woodward Ave. 42.35301°N 83.06031°W	1,260		Art Deco	C. Howard Crane
Riverfront 4 Movie Theatres		1978	Renaissance Center; 42°19′44.38″N 83°2′22.95″W	1,250		Modern	John Portman; Skidmore, Owings and Merrill
Greektown Casino Theatre		2009	555 East Lafayette St.	1,200		Novelty, Modern	Rossetti
MGM Grand Detroit Theatre		2007	1777 Third St.	1,200	MGM Mirage	Modern	SmithGroupJJR
Bonstelle Theatre		1903	3424 Woodward Ave. 42°20′46″N 83°3′25″W	1,173	Wayne State University	Neoclassical	Albert Kahn, C. Howard Crane
Detroit Film Theatre		1927	5201 Woodward Ave. 42°21′31″N 83°3′57″W	1,150	Detroit Institute of Arts	Neo-Renaissance	Paul Philippe Cret
Senate Theater		1926	6424 Michigan Ave. 42°19′52.57″N 83°7′22.02″W	900	Detroit Theater Organ Society	Art Deco	Christian W. Brandt
Hilberry Theatre		1916	4743 Cass Ave.	532	Wayne State University	Neoclassical	Field, Hinchman and Smith
City Theatre		2004	2301 Woodward Ave.	500	Olympia Entertainment		
Gem Theatre		1927	333 Madison St. 42°20′15″N 83°2′47″W	450		Italian Renaissance	George D. Mason
Century Theatre		1903	333 Madison St. 42°20′15″N 83°2′47″W	250		Italian Renaissance	George D. Mason
Chrysler IMAX Dome Theatre		2001	5020 John R. St.	230	Detroit Science Center	Postmodern	BEI Associates, Neumann/Smith, William Kessler Associates
Detroit Repertory Theatre		1963	13103 Woodrow Wilson St.	194	Detroit Repertory Theatre		
The Players		1925	3321 East Jefferson Ave.		The Players Club	Florentine Renaissance, Arts and Crafts, Art Deco murals.	William E. Kapp, Smith, Hinchman & Grylls
Bohemian National Home		1914	3009 Tillman St.				
Studio Theatre				112	Wayne State University	Black box	
Boll Family YMCA Theatre			1401 Broadway St.		YMCA, Plowshares Theatre Company	Modern	

== Historic venues awaiting restoration ==
Name	Image	Built	Location	Capacity	Organization	Style	Architect
National Theatre (inactive)		1911	118 Monroe St. 42°19′58″N 83°2′45″W	800	Phoenix Properties LLC	Baroque-Beaux Arts-Moorish	Albert Kahn
United Artists Theatre Building (inactive)		1928	150 Bagley St.	2,070	Ilitch Holdings	Spanish Gothic	C. Howard Crane
Vanity Ballroom (inactive)		1929	1024 Newport St.	2,000		Art Deco	Charles N. Agree
Grande Ballroom (inactive)		1928	8952 Grand River Ave.	1,500		Art Deco, Moorish Revival	Charles N. Agree
Alger Theater (inactive)		1935	16541 East Warren Avenue	1,500	Friends of the Alger Theater	Art Deco	

== See also ==
- Caesars Windsor
- Grand Riviera Theater
- List of concert halls
- Music of Detroit
- Michigan Building
