= Ilitch Holdings =

Holding company

Ilitch Holdings, Inc.
- Type: Private
- Founded: 1999; 27 years ago
- Founder: Mike Ilitch; Marian Ilitch
- Headquarters: Detroit, Michigan, U.S.
- Key people: Marian Ilitch (Chairman); Christopher Ilitch (President, CEO); Scott Fisher (CFO)
- Services: Professional services
- Revenue: $568.41 million (2020)
- Owner: Marian Ilitch
- Number of employees: 23,000 (2020)
- Subsidiaries: Little Caesars; Detroit Red Wings; Detroit Tigers; Olympia Entertainment; Olympia Development; Champion Food; Ocean Casino Resort; MotorCity Casino Hotel; 313 Presents (joint venture)
- Website: ilitchcompanies.com

Ilitch Holdings, Inc. is an American holding company established in 1999 to provide all companies owned by Mike and Marian Ilitch with professional and technical services. Its privately held businesses include Little Caesars Pizza, the Detroit Red Wings, the Detroit Tigers, Olympia Entertainment, Olympia Development, Olympia Parking, Blue Line Foodservice Distribution, Champion Foods, 313 Presents, the Little Caesars Pizza Kit Fundraising Program, Hockeytown Cafe, and a variety of venues within these entities. Ilitch Holdings subsidiaries manage Ocean Casino Resort in Atlantic City; and in Detroit, the Fox Theatre (which also houses the company's headquarters, as well as City Theatre, Comerica Park, Pine Knob Music Theatre, Michigan Lottery Amphitheater, Meadow Brook Amphitheater, and Little Caesars Arena, which replaced Joe Louis Arena after closing in July 2017.

Christopher Ilitch, one of Mike & Marian Ilitch's seven children, is CEO and President of Ilitch Holdings and Chairman of Ilitch Charities. Marian Ilitch serves as the chairman. Ilitch Holdings have recently made an offer on Colliers International a commercial brokerage platform driven by Pacific Premier Bancorp. The purchase amount is expected to be around $260 million.

== Background ==
Mike and Marian Ilitch started Little Caesars in 1959. A complementary business, Blue Line Foodservice, was soon started to supply ingredients and other products to the growing restaurant chain.

In 1982, Ilitch entered into sports with the purchase of the struggling Red Wings. Ilitch, executing his long-term Detroit business conglomerate plan, also purchased Olympia Stadium Corporation that year. Olympia Stadium operated the Joe Louis and Cobo arenas.

The couple purchased and restored the downtown Fox Theatre in 1987. In 1988, they fielded an indoor football team, Detroit Drive, in the Arena Football League. In 1992, Mike purchased the Detroit Tigers. Purchasing the Tigers led him to sell the Drive in February 1994 given the leagues' overlapping schedules.

In 1996, the Ilitch family purchased the Birmingham movie theater in Birmingham, Michigan.

== History ==
Ilitch Holdings was formed in 1999 to manage their various holdings. It formed Uptown Entertainment to own its Birmingham 8 and Palladium 12 theaters.

Until 2004, Christopher and Denise Ilitch, children of Mike and Marian, were co-presidents of Ilitch Holdings. At that time, Denise grew estranged from both her brother and parents and resigned from the position.

On July 1, 2015, Uptown Entertainment sold the Birmingham 8 movie theater to Birmingham Theatre, LLC. Chris Ilitch, then president and CEO of Ilitch Holdings, was designated as successor to his parents' positions, chair and vice chair, in running the companies. At the time Mike was running the sports teams, while Marian was in charge of the casino. Marian owned the casino due to MLB regulations that bar team owners from owning gambling establishments. After the death of Mike in March 2017, Chris took over management of the sports teams per the established succession plan.

== Controversy ==
Ilitch Holdings has been criticised for leaving many properties in Detroit untenanted, allowing them to decay, and for demolishing historic buildings and leaving lots empty, or only using the lots as car parking, rather than developing them.

== Subsidiaries ==
- Blue Line Foodservice, restaurant supply distribution
- Champion Foods, manufacture frozen pizza, breadsticks, calzone and cookie dough kits for private label and store brands
  - Authentic Motor City Pizza Co., manufacture frozen Detroit-style pizza
- Ilitch Sports Entertainment
  - Detroit Tigers (1992) MLB team
  - Detroit Red Wings (1982) NHL team
  - 313 Presents (50%)
- Little Caesars Enterprise, Inc. (1959) pizza restaurant
- Little Caesars Pizza Kit Fundraising Program, fundraising business through assisting group sell pizza kits
- Olympia Development: The real estate arm which built the new Little Caesars Arena
- Olympia Entertainment (1982) formerly Olympia Stadium Corporation, manages multiple venues in sports and entertainment plus restaurants and retail.
  - Fox Theatre
  - City Theatre
  - Sound Board at MotorCity Casino Hotel
  - Comerica Park
  - Hockeytown Cafe
  - True Religion, 40% ownership
  - Little Caesars Arena
- Ocean Casino Resort, 50% ownership
- MotorCity Casino Hotel
