= Christopher Ilitch =

American businessman (born 1965)

- Ilitch in 2026
- Born: Christopher Paul Ilitch; June 2, 1965 (age 61); Detroit, Michigan, U.S.
- Education: University of Michigan
- Occupation: Businessman
- Title: President and CEO, Ilitch Holdings
- Term: 2010-
- Spouse: Kelle Lites (m. 2001; div. 2024)
- Children: 3
- Parent(s): Mike Ilitch; Marian Ilitch
- Relatives: Denise Ilitch (sister); Jim Lites (former brother-in-law)

Christopher Paul Ilitch (born June 2, 1965) is an American businessman, and president and chief executive officer (CEO) of Ilitch Holdings, Inc., a holding company for businesses that were founded or purchased by Mike and Marian Ilitch. Ilitch companies include Little Caesars Pizza, Olympia Entertainment, MotorCity Casino Hotel, the Detroit Tigers of Major League Baseball, the Detroit Red Wings of the National Hockey League, and numerous real estate holdings. In 2018, the organization's total combined revenue was $3.8 billion.

Through Ilitch Holdings, Ilitch is chairman and CEO of the Detroit Tigers, and governor, president, and CEO of the Detroit Red Wings.

== Early life ==
Ilitch is the youngest son of Mike Ilitch and Marian Ilitch. His siblings are Denise Ilitch, Ronald "Ron" Tyrus Ilitch, Michael C. Ilitch Jr., Lisa M. Ilitch Murray, Atanas Ilitch (born Thomas Ilitch), and Carole M. Ilitch. He is the former brother-in-law of sports executive Jim Lites.

Ilitch attended high school at Cranbrook Kingswood in Bloomfield Hills, Michigan, where he was captain of the baseball team, and a member of the 1983 state championship hockey team. He earned a bachelor's degree in business administration from the University of Michigan in 1987.

== Career ==
Ilitch worked a short time at IBM before joining his family's business. He started managing a Little Caesars location in Walled Lake, Michigan, and later managing several stores in the Chicago area before returning to Detroit. In 2000, Ilitch and his sister Denise Ilitch were named co-presidents of Ilitch Holdings. Denise resigned in 2004, and Christopher was named sole CEO.

As president and CEO, Ilitch leads and provides oversight to the Ilitch companies, including Little Caesars Pizza, Blue Line Distribution, the Detroit Red Wings, Olympia Entertainment, the Detroit Tigers, Olympia Development of Michigan (real estate), Little Caesars Pizza Kit Fundraising Program, and Champion Foods (food manufacturing). The organization also has a joint venture interest in 313 Presents. Additionally, Christopher's mother Marian Ilitch owns MotorCity Casino Hotel. Under Major League Baseball rules, an owner or officer of a baseball club cannot own or operate a casino. Bob DuPuy, baseball’s chief operating officer, stated in 2006 that the arrangement was permissible, as Marian has no stake in the Tigers, and Christopher has no stake in the casino.

Ilitch has his name engraved on the Stanley Cup as a member of team management for the Red Wings NHL Championships in 1997, 1998, 2002, and 2008.

== Civic roles ==
Ilitch is chairman of Ilitch Charities. He serves on the board of directors for Business Leaders for Michigan, the Downtown Detroit Partnership, and the Detroit Economic Club. Ilitch is also a member of the Detroit chapter of the Young Presidents' Organization.

Ilitch has served on the host committees for major sporting events held in Detroit, including the 2009 NCAA Division I men's basketball tournament, the 2005 Major League Baseball All-Star Game, and Super Bowl XL. Along with William Clay Ford Jr., he served as co-chair for the 2010 NCAA Division I Men's Ice Hockey Tournament held at Ford Field in Detroit.

== Personal life ==
He and his wife, Kelle, have three children and reside in metro Detroit. In August 2024, they filed for divorce.

Ilitch remains an avid hockey player and competes in an adult league in the Metro Detroit area.

Ilitch is a third generation Macedonian American, as both his mother and father were children of Macedonian immigrants to the Detroit area.
