= Pine Knob Music Theatre =

Open-air theater in Independence Township, Michigan

Coordinates: 42°44′43″N 83°22′21″W

- Lawn and pavilion in 2026
- Former names: Pine Knob Music Theatre (1972–2001; 2022–present); DTE Energy Music Theatre (2001–2022)
- Address: 33 Bob Seger Dr; Clarkston, MI 48348-4784
- Location: Pine Knob Ski Resort
- Owner: Palace Sports & Entertainment
- Operator: 313 Presents
- Capacity: 15,040: 6,968 in pavilion; 8,072 on lawn

Construction
- Opened: June 25, 1972

Website
- Official website

Pine Knob Music Theatre (formerly DTE Energy Music Theatre) is an outdoor amphitheater located in Independence Township, Michigan, approximately 40 miles (64 km) northwest of Detroit. Built by the Nederlander Organization in the early 1970s, it is known as "Pine Knob Music Theatre" due to its proximity to the nearby Pine Knob ski area and golf course. Designed by Neumann/Smith, it was conceived and built by Joe Locricchio.

Palace Sports & Entertainment, which owns the Detroit Pistons, purchased the amphitheater in 1990. 313 Presents promotes and produces concerts at the venue, in addition to five other venues across southesast Michigan, including Little Caesars Arena, Fox Theatre, Comerica Park, Meadow Brook Amphitheatre and Michigan Lottery Amphitheatre. Annually, Pine Knob ranks among the top-selling outdoor concert venues in the world and has won dozens of awards in the industry, including Pollstar's Best Major Outdoor Concert Venue (2000), Billboard's Top Amphitheater for attendance (2011) and Pollstar's Top Amphitheater Venue Worldwide for total tickets sold (2011, 2019, 2022).

== History ==
The amphitheater held its grand opening on June 25, 1972, with a matinee performance by teen idol David Cassidy. Andy Williams performed the first evening concert two nights later. At the time of its opening, Pine Knob was the largest amphitheater in the United States with a capacity of 12,500.

One of the features of the first years of Pine Knob was the entrance way to the amphitheater. Long cement retaining walls that cut through the hill/lawn were professionally hand-painted with the logos of every artist or group that had performed there. The walls were filled in and replaced by stairs and more lawn seating during the early 1980s, thus increasing the amphitheater's capacity to more than 15,000. The original sound system was novel in its day, a huge theatrical performance system designed for an outdoor theater with a custom console and large-array distributed speaker system.

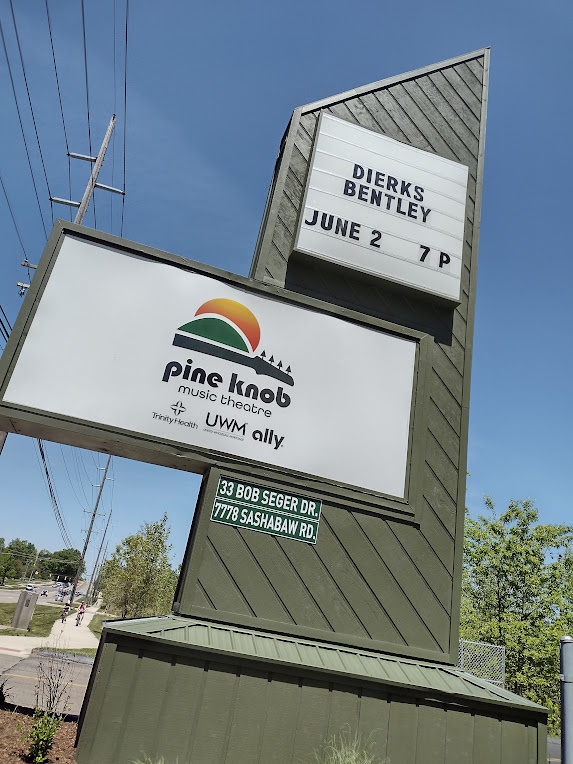
Marquee on Sashabaw Road in 2023

On November 29, 1990, Palace Sports & Entertainment purchased Pine Knob and spent $8 million on renovations. Included in the upgrades were video screens in the pavilion. In 1995, additional video screens were installed in the pavilion's roof for spectators to see from the lawn.

On January 25, 2001, Palace Sports & Entertainment entered a 20-year branding partnership with DTE Energy. For the next two decades, Pine Knob would become DTE Energy Music Theatre.

Before the 2012 season, the amphitheater received a new audio system – the Meyer MILO Line Array sound system. The amphitheater was also redesigned with forest green colors, new signage, expanded food options and a new open-air beer garden called The Pine Tap.

Many musicians have performed at the Knob. For more than 20 years (with the exception of 1995) beginning in 1989, Eddie Money opened the concert season each May. Through 2014, Chicago has appeared at the venue 82 times, more than any other act. Linda Ronstadt also performed there nearly every summer throughout the 1970s, 1980s, and 1990s. Bob Seger has played more than 33 sold-out shows at the amphitheater, including eight in 1977, a record for most performances in one season that was matched by Kid Rock in 2013, then surpassed by Kid Rock again in 2015, with ten consecutive sold-out shows. Bob Dylan played Pine Knob nine times between 1981 and 2000. Detroit's own Diana Ross often made it her hometown stop during her summer schedules. Dave Matthews Band has played Pine Knob 17 times since 2006, on their yearly summer tour.

Pine Knob is the usual Detroit-area stop for some of the biggest tours of the summer concert season, including The Area:One and Area2 Festival, Crüe Fest, Ozzfest, Curiosa, Projekt Revolution, The Gigantour, Reggae Sunsplash and The Family Values Tour. Lilith Fair made a stop at the venue in every year it toured in the 1990s (1997–1999) and also during its revival tour in 2010. It was the Detroit-area stop for Warped Tour in 1996 and 1997, and also for the Lollapalooza tour in every year of its existence but one before the tour signed an exclusive deal with the city of Chicago.

The venue hosts the Lake Orion and Clarkston High School graduation ceremonies, typically held at the end of May or beginning of June. In 2021 it also hosted the Berkley High School graduation ceremony, as it was moved from its usual venue of Meadow Brook Amphitheatre due to the COVID-19 pandemic.

The address of the amphitheater was officially changed in June 2019 from 7774 Sashabaw Road to 33 Bob Seger Drive, to honor the 33 shows he has done at the venue. He played his final show there on June 21, 2019.

In June 2021, 313 Presents announced a five-year agreement with Lume Cannabis Co. at DTE Energy Music Theatre. The agreement included renovation of the Pine Tap to become the "Tree House Lounge" located inside DTE Energy Music Theatre's West Entrance. The 6,000 square-foot Tree House includes an indoor lounge area where guests can purchase Lume-branded merchandise and learn about the company's retail offerings. Cannabis consumption and purchase is not permitted on-premises.

West entrance from parking lot in 2026

On January 14, 2022, the venue's name was changed from DTE Energy Music Theatre back to its original name, Pine Knob Music Theatre.

== Time restrictions ==
Because of the venue's close proximity to nearby residents, it is known for having a strict 11:00 pm noise curfew. The performers are subject to a $1,000 fine for every minute played past the curfew.

The time restriction is said to be the reason for an incident backstage between Marilyn Manson and Rob Zombie on October 12, 2012. Opening for Rob Zombie, Marilyn Manson took the stage late, thus forcing Rob Zombie's set short to avoid the curfew.

== Video, audio, photographic appearances ==
A variety of concerts from the venue have been videotaped and recorded through the years.

One of the latest works is a DVD release of Barenaked Ladies' Talk to the Hand: Live in Michigan. During the set, vocalist Steven Page asks how the "Pine Knobbers" are feeling, after which a large cheer fills the amphitheater.

As one of the first modern FM/broadcast television "simulcasts," in the summer of 1982, the Steve Miller Band was shown on Detroit broadcast station WKBD-TV and heard simultaneously on FM 98.7 WLLZ. This concert was a timely promotion for Miller's single, "Abracadabra", and featured an unseasonably cold and wet audience which weathered the event with excitement. Late in the afternoon, prior to the evening concert, tickets were made available at local record stores so Pine Knob could ensure a full venue, even with bad weather approaching.

Singer, songwriter and guitarist Peter Frampton released a live CD and DVD, titled Live in Detroit, featuring a July 17, 1999, Pine Knob appearance.

On the black market, many bootleg recordings from the Pine Knob soundboard exist, as well as freely traded concerts like those of the Grateful Dead and Phish. The Dead's June 19 and 20, 1991 performances (featuring Bruce Hornsby on piano) saw an official release in 2006 as Grateful Dead Download Series Volume 11.

As an additional note, Genesis drummer and frontman Phil Collins is clearly seen wearing a Pine Knob logo golf shirt in the music video for the studio version of the song "No Reply At All". Alternate live versions of the song from the Three Sides Live recordings are not the same.

Dave Matthews Band have included various live recordings on their limited edition Warehouse bonus discs, which are mailed out yearly to members of their fan association. These selections include "One Sweet World", "Hello Again", and "You Might Die Trying" from the 2018 show. They also selected "Come Tomorrow" from the 2018 show for their live compilation, "Rhino's Choice". They also broadcast a video recording of the show from July 9, 2019, as part of their "DMB Drive-In" series due to their 2020 summer tour being rescheduled as a result of the COVID-19 pandemic.

Jackson Browne used a photograph of himself and future wife Lynne Sweeney standing in the Pine Knob loading dock door in the booklet of his Running On Empty album. The photo was taken on August 21, 1977, by photographer Joel Bernstein.

The front cover of Joni Mitchell's 1974 live album, Miles of Aisles, features the interior of the pavilion as it appeared at the time, although the tracks on the album were recorded at venues in California.

Green Day's second live album, Awesome as Fuck, includes a version of "J.A.R.", recorded at DTE on August 23, 2010.

The J. Geils Band recorded their third live album, Showtime!, during a sold-out week-long stand at Pine Knob in early September 1982.

Kansas' first live album, Two for the Show, contains selections recorded at Pine Knob. Frontman Robby Steinhardt can be heard saying "Good evening, Pine Knob Clarkston and welcome to Kansas" as the volume fades on one of the album's sides, after the song "The Wall."

The fourth incarnation of Ringo Starr & His All-Starr Band, featuring Peter Frampton, Gary Brooker, Jack Bruce and Simon Kirke, filmed their performance at Pine Knob in May 1998 for home video release. To date, "Ringo Starr & His Fourth All-Starr Band" has only been released on VHS and has not been re-issued, although clips appear on 2001's "The Best of Ringo Starr & His All-Starr Band So Far".

Steely Dan's Alive in America album features four tracks ("Bodhisattva", "Peg", "Kid Charlemagne" and "Sign in Stranger") that were recorded during the band's August 27, 1994, performance at Pine Knob.

Def Leppard released a live CD/DVD And There Will Be a Next Time... Live from Detroit which was recorded at a concert at DTE in July 2016.

Roxy Music Live contains two songs, (Remake/Remodel) and (Oh Yeah!), recorded from their July 29, 2001, show at Pine Knob.

One of the most famous photographs of Cliff Burton, second bassist of Metallica, was taken by Ross Halfin at Pine Knob on July 21, 1986, during the Damage, Inc. Tour.

== See also ==
- List of contemporary amphitheatres
