= Olympia Entertainment =

Sports and entertainment company

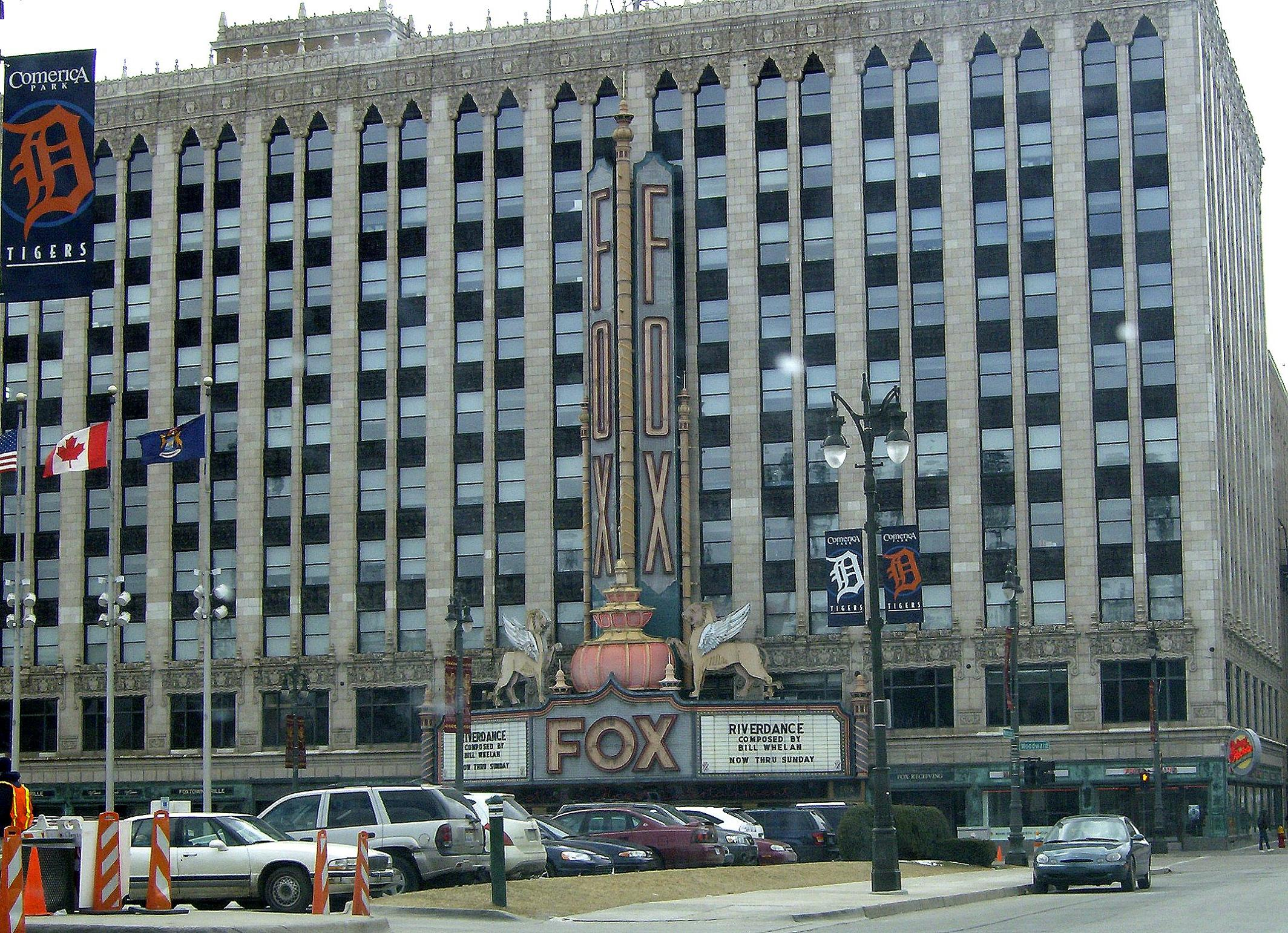
- The headquarters of Olympia Entertainment and the Fox Theatre
- Formerly: Olympia Stadium Corporation (1927—1982); Olympia Arenas (1982–1996)
- Company type: Subsidiary
- Industry: Professional sports, property management, entertainment
- Founded: 1927
- Headquarters: Fox Theatre; Detroit, Michigan, United States
- Area served: Detroit
- Key people: Marian Bayoff Ilitch
- Parent: Ilitch Holdings
- Subsidiaries: Detroit Red Wings; Detroit Tigers; Fox Theatre; Comerica Park; Little Caesars Arena; City Theatre; 313 Presents
- Website: Olympia Entertainment

Olympia Entertainment is an American sports and entertainment company headquartered in the Fox Theatre in Downtown Detroit, Michigan. Olympia is a division of Ilitch Holdings and owned by Marian Ilitch. It owns or manages the Detroit Red Wings, the Detroit Tigers, the Fox Theatre, Joe Louis Arena (management), Comerica Park (management), Cobo Arena (management), City Theatre, Hockeytown Café, as well as the new Little Caesars Arena, home of the Red Wings and Detroit Pistons. Starting on December 1, 2007, Olympia began managing the entertainment venues at the Detroit Masonic Temple after the Detroit Masonic Association ousted the previous management company Halberd.

Olympia Entertainment traces its roots to the 1927 opening of its namesake, the Olympia Stadium, longtime home of the Red Wings. By the 1930s, the Norris family, owners of the Red Wings, had formed Olympia Stadium Corporation as a management company for the arena. In 1979, Olympia Stadium Corporation became the management company for the newly built Joe Louis Arena, which was owned by the city of Detroit and leased to the Red Wings. Mike and Marian Ilitch bought Olympia Stadium Corporation as part of their 1982 purchase of the Red Wings and renamed it Olympia Arenas. The Ilitches also bought and renovated the Fox Theatre in 1987 and moved Olympia and Little Caesars' headquarters there a year later. The current name, Olympia Entertainment, was adopted in 1996.

On October 8, 2017, Olympia Entertainment and Palace Sports & Entertainment announced a joint venture known as 313 Presents, which assumed the responsibility of entertainment booking, production, media relations, and promotion of the two companies' six venues.
