= Palace Sports & Entertainment =

US sports and entertainment company

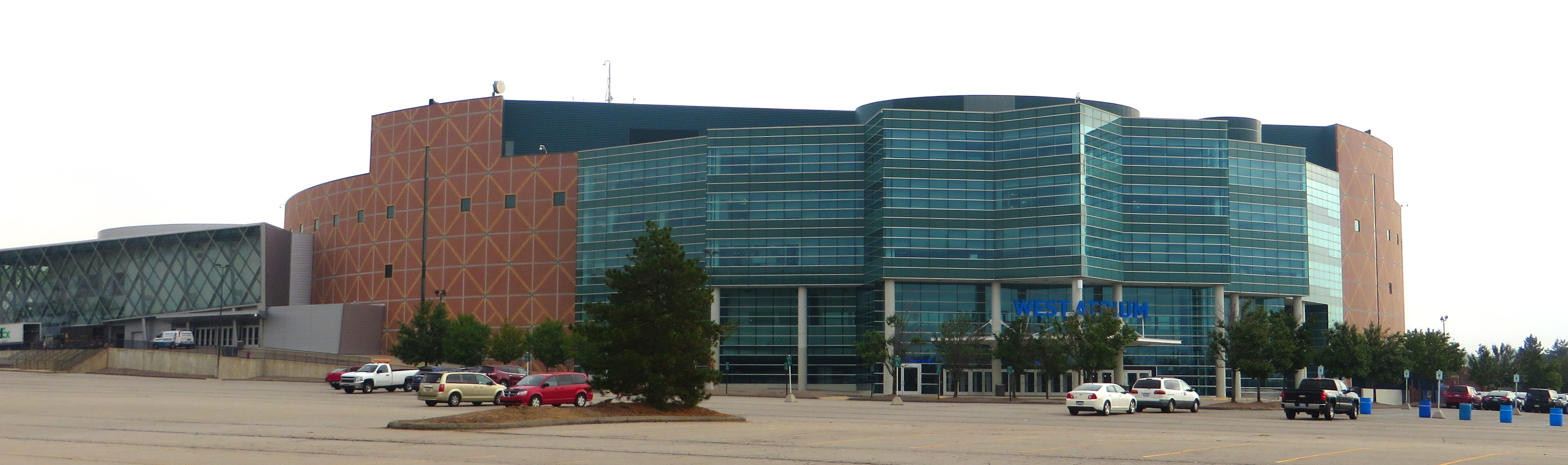
- Palace of Auburn Hills, before demolition
- Type: Privately held
- Industry: Professional sports
- Founded: 1988; 38 years ago
- Founder: Bill Davidson
- Fate: Acquired by Tom Gores
- Headquarters: 6 Championship Drive; Auburn Hills, Michigan 48326
- Area served: Metro Detroit
- Brands: Detroit Pistons
- Divisions: 313 Presents

Palace Sports & Entertainment (PS&E) is an American sports and entertainment company owned by Tom Gores. Its largest subsidiary is the Detroit Pistons of the National Basketball Association.

The company was founded by Bill Davidson, and traces its roots to Davidson's purchase of the Pistons in 1974. Its current structure dates from 1988, when the Pistons moved to a new arena, The Palace of Auburn Hills. Davidson was company chairman until his death in 2009. His widow, Karen, sold the company to Gores in 2011.

PS&E also owns and/or operates several venues, including the Pine Knob Music Theatre in Clarkston, Michigan, and the Meadow Brook Amphitheatre on the Oakland University.

On October 8, 2017, in the wake of the closure of The Palace of Auburn Hills in favor of Little Caesars Arena, Palace Sports & Entertainment announced a joint venture with Olympia Entertainment, owner of the National Hockey League's Detroit Red Wings. The venture, known as 313 Presents, assumed responsibility for entertainment booking, production, media relations, and promotion of the two companies' venues.

PS&E owned the Tampa Bay Lightning of the National Hockey League, the Asheville Tourists of minor league baseball's South Atlantic League, and the WNBA's Detroit Shock until 2009, when the team was sold to a group of investors from Oklahoma.

PS&E also owned the now-defunct Detroit Safari of the Continental Indoor Soccer League, Detroit Fury of the AFL, and Detroit Vipers of the IHL.
