= Little Caesars Arena =

Multi-purpose arena in Detroit, Michigan, US

- LCA

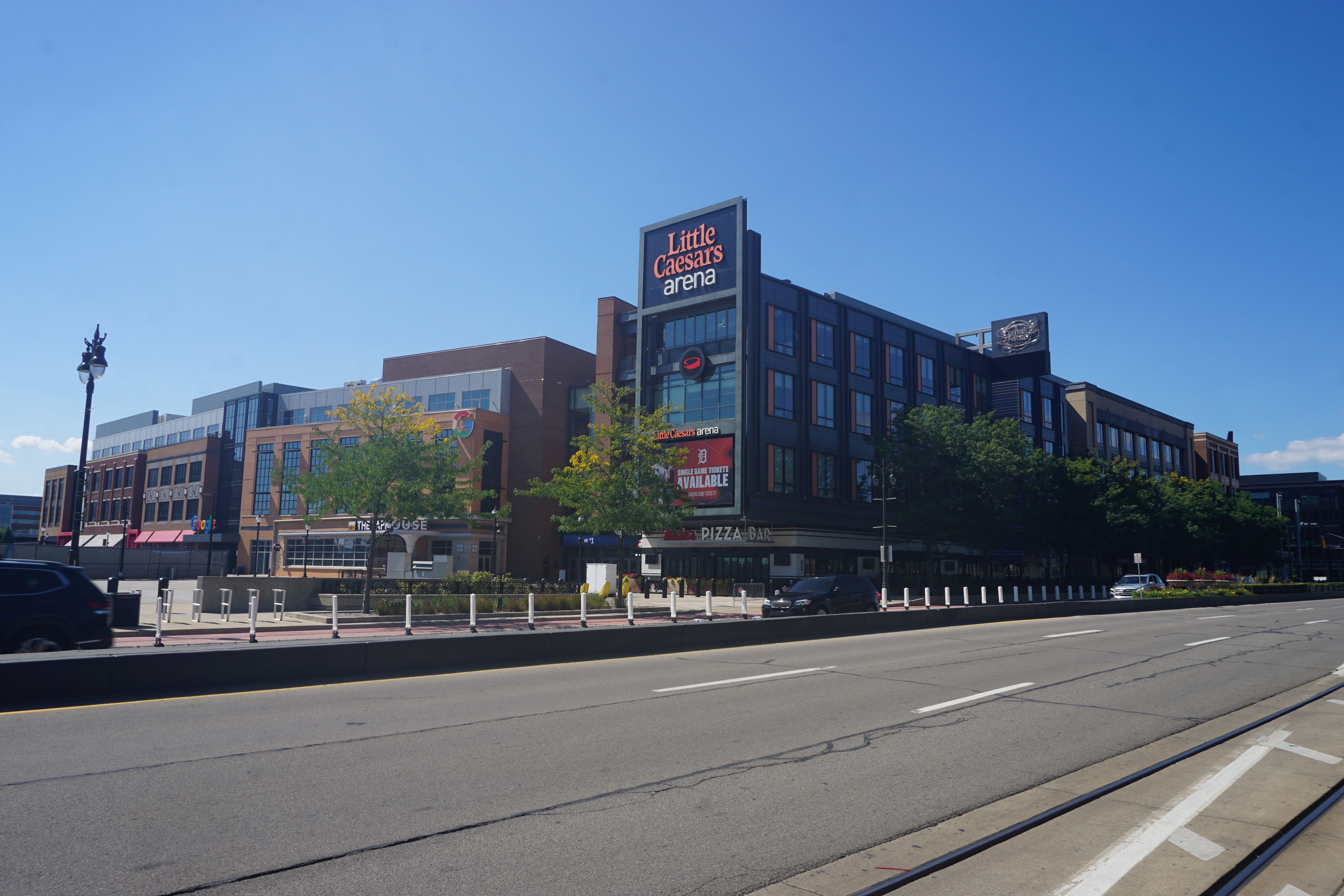
- Little Caesars Arena in 2025

- Location in Wayne County, Michigan Location in Michigan Location in the United States
- Former names: Detroit Events Center (planning name)
- Address: 2645 Woodward Avenue
- Location: Detroit, Michigan, U.S.
- Coordinates: 42°20′28″N 83°3′18″W
- Owner: Downtown Development Authority
- Operator: 313 Presents
- Capacity: Basketball: 20,332; Concerts: 15,000–22,000; Ice hockey: 19,515
- Executive suites: 62
- Public transit: Sproat Street/Adelaide Street; DDOT 4 SMART 461, 462

Construction
- Groundbreaking: September 25, 2014
- Opened: September 5, 2017
- Cost: US$862.9 million ($1.17 billion in 2025 dollars)
- Architect: HOK
- Structural engineer: Magnusson Klemencic Associates
- Services engineers: Smith Seckman Reid, Inc.
- General contractors: Barton Malow; Hunt Construction; White

Tenants
- Detroit Red Wings (NHL) (2017–present); Detroit Pistons (NBA) (2017–present); Detroit Clutch (PWHL) (starting in 2026); Detroit WNBA team (WNBA) (starting in 2029)

Website
- Official website

Little Caesars Arena is a multi-purpose arena in Midtown Detroit. Opening in September 2017, the arena, which cost $862.9 million to construct, replaced Joe Louis Arena and the Palace of Auburn Hills as the home of the Detroit Red Wings of the National Hockey League (NHL) and the Detroit Pistons of the National Basketball Association (NBA), respectively. It will also serve as the home of the Detroit Clutch of the Professional Women's Hockey League (PWHL) and the Detroit WNBA team of the Women's National Basketball Association (WNBA) in 2026 and 2029, respectively.

The arena features a unique, clear plastic roofed concourse connecting it to offices and shops surrounding it. It was designed to be the flagship of a new $2.1 billion 650,000-square-foot (60,000 m^{2}) sports and entertainment district, the District Detroit, with mixed-use neighborhoods with new residential and retail outlets located around the Cass Corridor, Ford Field, and Comerica Park. However, this has yet to materialize. The lack of progress has received both local and national attention.

== Design ==
Little Caesars Arena was designed by HOK, and features a unique "deconstructed" layout. Buildings housing retail outlets, including several restaurants, the arena's box office, and the offices of the Red Wings are built outside the arena, but a glass roof is erected between the buildings and the arena itself. The roof forms an indoor "street" that serves as the arena's concourse. The concourse will remain open year-round, even if an event is not occurring inside the arena, allowing it to also be used as a venue of its own. There is also an outdoor plaza with a large video display.

The eight-story arena is built as a bowl, with its floor 40 feet (12 m) below street level, with seating capacities of 19,515 for ice hockey and 20,332 for basketball. The bowl also features a "gondola" seating level suspended above the stands. The exterior of the bowl structure is capable of displaying video projections. A 37,300-square-foot (3,470 m^{2}) practice ice rink is also inside the arena. In addition to serving as the practice facility for the Red Wings, the rink serves as the home of both Little Caesars AAA Hockey Club and Little Caesars Amateur Hockey League as well.

The Bell Centre in Montreal has been cited to be one of the biggest influences of the arena's design. Christopher Ilitch described the arena's design as being "revolutionary", and believes that it may influence future arena designs in other cities.

The arena features a centerhung scoreboard that measures at 5,100 square feet (470 m^{2}). The arena also features 45 LED displays covering more than 13,500 square feet (1,250 m^{2}) and 16.5 million plus LEDs in and around it.

The goal horn used at Joe Louis Arena from 1995 to 2017 was not moved to Little Caesars Arena. The old horn's acoustics would have made it all but impossible to hear in the new arena. More importantly, there was no safe way to store the compressed nitrogen gas that powered the old horn. An amplified recording of the horn was played over the sound system instead, in a move that received mixed reviews from Red Wings fans. Ahead of the 2023–24 season, Little Caesars Arena installed a new horn matching the model previously used at Joe Louis Arena, but using compressed air rather than nitrogen.

== History ==
=== Rumors and announcement ===
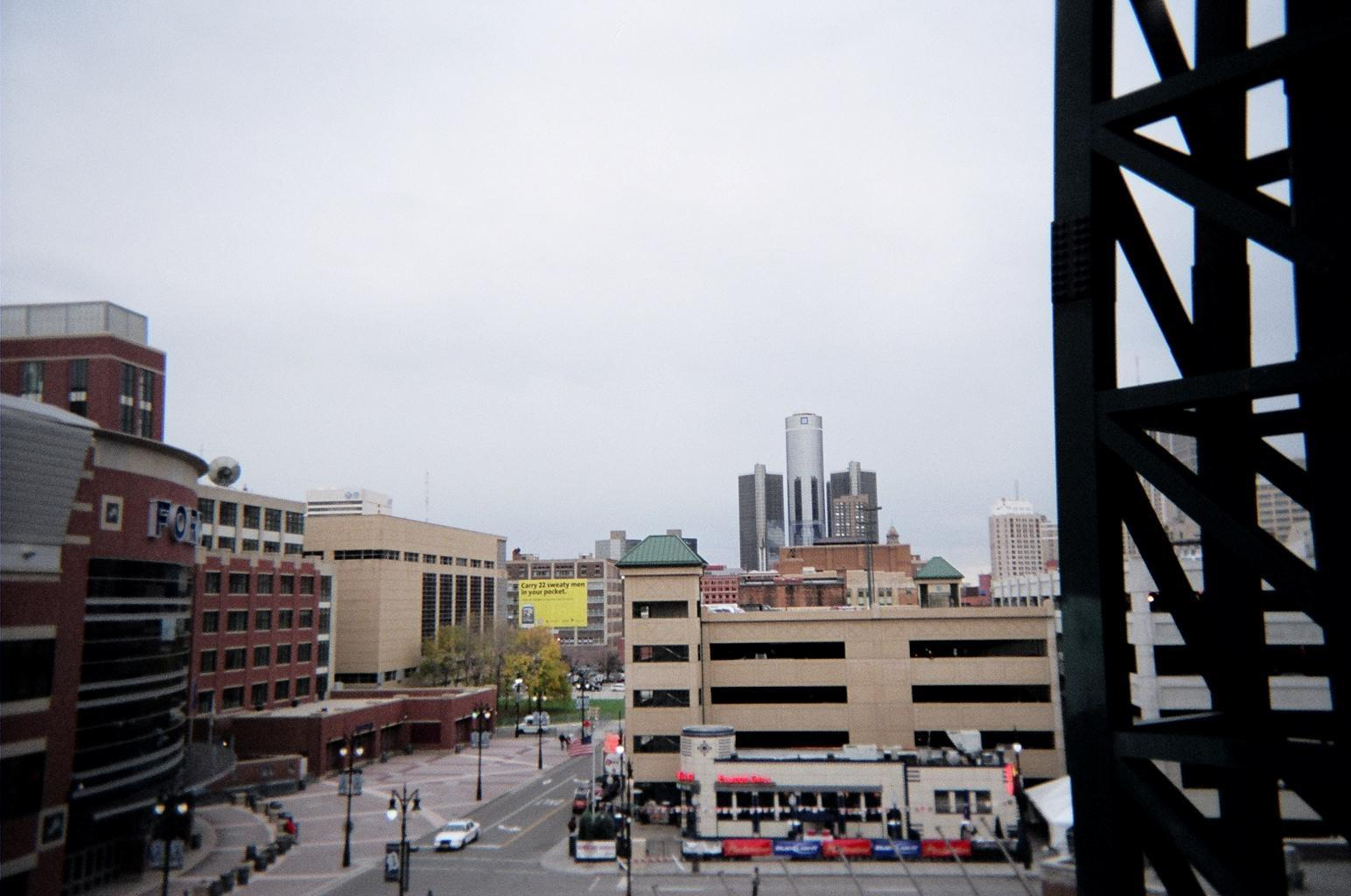
Comerica Park and Ford Field (pictured) were incorporated into a "Wildcat Corner" district near the new arena.

It was reported in May 2012 that the Red Wings had hired HKS, Inc. and NBBJ to design a new arena for the team, which would replace Joe Louis Arena. The new arena would be owned by the city's Downtown Development Authority (DDA) and its land would be leased to Olympia Entertainment, a subsidiary of the Red Wings' parent company, Ilitch Holdings, rent free for a long term. Olympia would have full operational control of the arena, an arrangement similar to the one Olympia had with the city-owned Joe Louis Arena. Sales of game tickets, parking, concessions, souvenirs, and any potential naming rights deals would not be subject to revenue sharing with the City of Detroit as they were with Joe Louis Arena. The city earned an average of $7 million per year through these revenue sharing agreements.

Olympia Entertainment officially announced in December 2012 its intention to develop a new district in downtown Detroit composed of offices, residential facilities, and "a new state-of-the-art, multi-purpose events center", with an estimated cost of $650 million. In June 2013, the DDA officially announced the location of the new arena and entertainment district. An estimated 58 percent of the cost to construct the arena was to be funded by public tax dollars, about $261 million. On July 24, 2013, the Michigan Strategic Fund approved the DDA's request for $650 million in funding.

Christopher Ilitch unveiled renderings of the new arena and entertainment district on July 20, 2014, referring to it as the District Detroit. He explained that the project's goal was to "build out a sports and entertainment district that is world-class and rivals anything in the country, perhaps the world." The district, which would complement the QLine streetcar, was primarily built on vacant land near the Cass Corridor along Woodward Avenue, and would incorporate five distinct neighborhoods with new residential and apartment units and European-influenced designs. The district would also feature a hotel, new restaurants, and new retail outlets. Olympia Development would fund the refurbishment of public infrastructure around the arena district, such as street lighting, sidewalks, and paving. One of the neighborhoods, referred to by Ilitch as "Wildcat Corner", would incorporate the area occupied by the Tigers and Lions' home venues of Comerica Park and Ford Field, respectively, and replace several parking lots with new apartment complexes featuring street-level retail outlets.

Ilitch emphasized the impact of the arena district project would have on Detroit's economy: the new facilities would result in 1,000 new jobs in the city, and 8,300 new jobs would be created for the construction process. Olympia was committed to having 51% of the construction jobs be filled by residents of Detroit. Additionally, two Michigan-based contractors would be among those working on the arena, and 80% of the materials used in the construction of the arena was also to be sourced from Michigan-based companies when possible.

Olympia Entertainment CEO Tom Wilson described an intent for the arena to be an "epicenter" for hockey, prospecting it as a site for events and tournaments at the college and junior levels such as the IIHF World Junior Championship and the Memorial Cup. Wilson also stated its commitment to continue hosting the annual collegiate Great Lakes Invitational at the arena, provided the universities involved maintained their desire to participate.

=== Construction ===
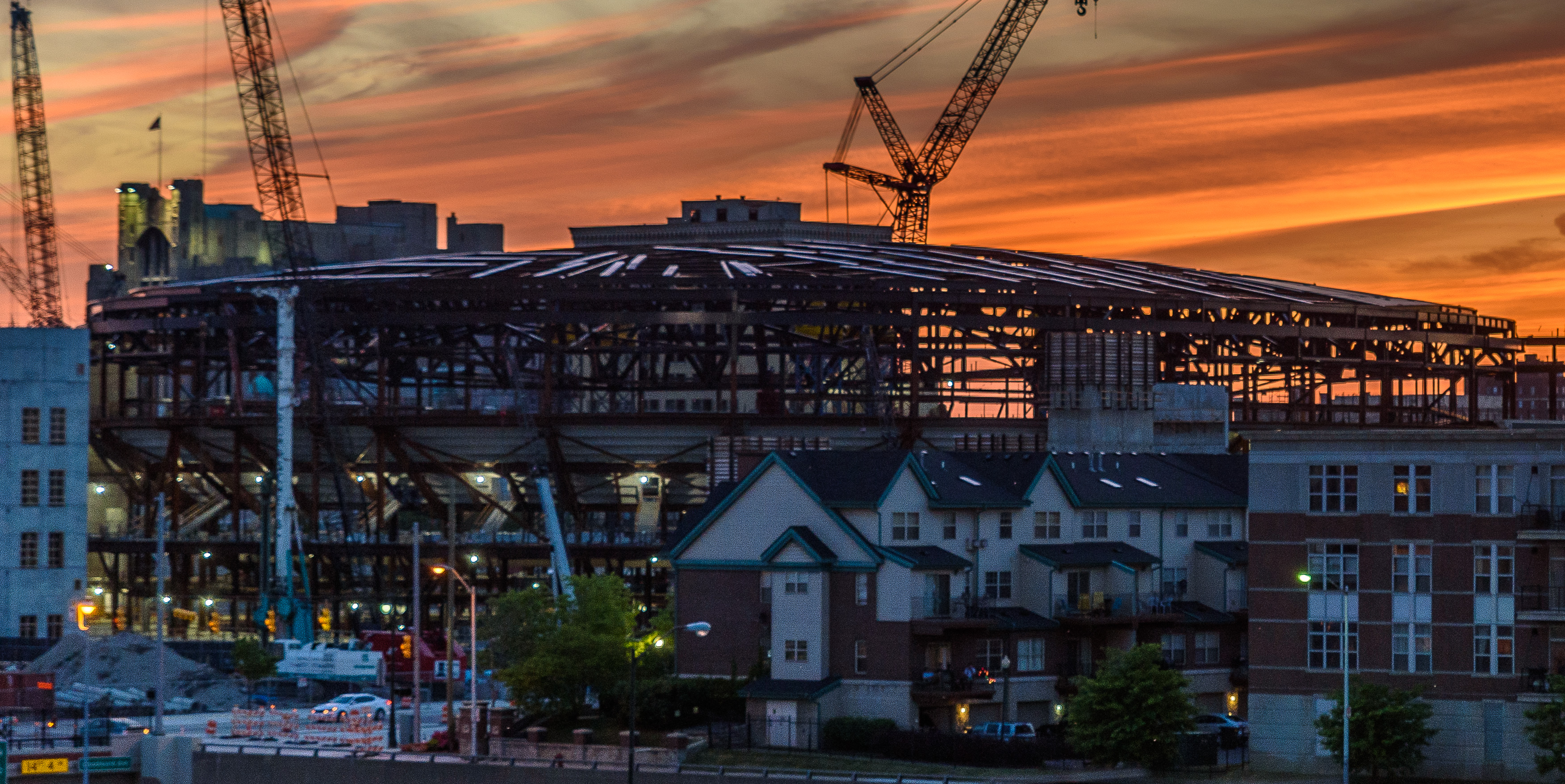
Construction in progress in June 2016.

A formal groundbreaking ceremony was held at the arena site on September 25, 2014. Following the completion of the new arena, Joe Louis Arena was demolished, and its former site was to be redeveloped into a hotel and retail complex. The sale of the Joe Louis Arena site came as part of a bankruptcy settlement between the Financial Guaranty Insurance Company and the city of Detroit.

Mass excavation at the arena site began on April 24, 2015, a few days after Detroit City Council approved a zoning change, allowing vertical construction to officially commence.

The Detroit Historic District Commission approved the demolition of the Park Avenue Hotel on June 10 to make room for the arena's loading dock. Olympia Development claimed that the Park Avenue Hotel stood in a high-security area. A demolition permit was issued on June 22. Detroit-based Adamo Demolition was the contractor listed on the permit. Despite protests, the building was imploded on July 11, 2015. On August 30, Olympia Entertainment announced that an estimated 488,000 cubic yards (373,000 m^{3}) of soil had been excavated in recent months for the below-grade bowl, and hundreds of deep pier foundations were being drilled and filled with concrete through September. The steel frame of the arena began to go up in late fall.

Construction of the ice surface began on January 5, 2017. On February 16, various construction changes began inside the arena in order to accommodate the Detroit Pistons. Construction of the ice rink began on March 8.

=== Pistons' move ===
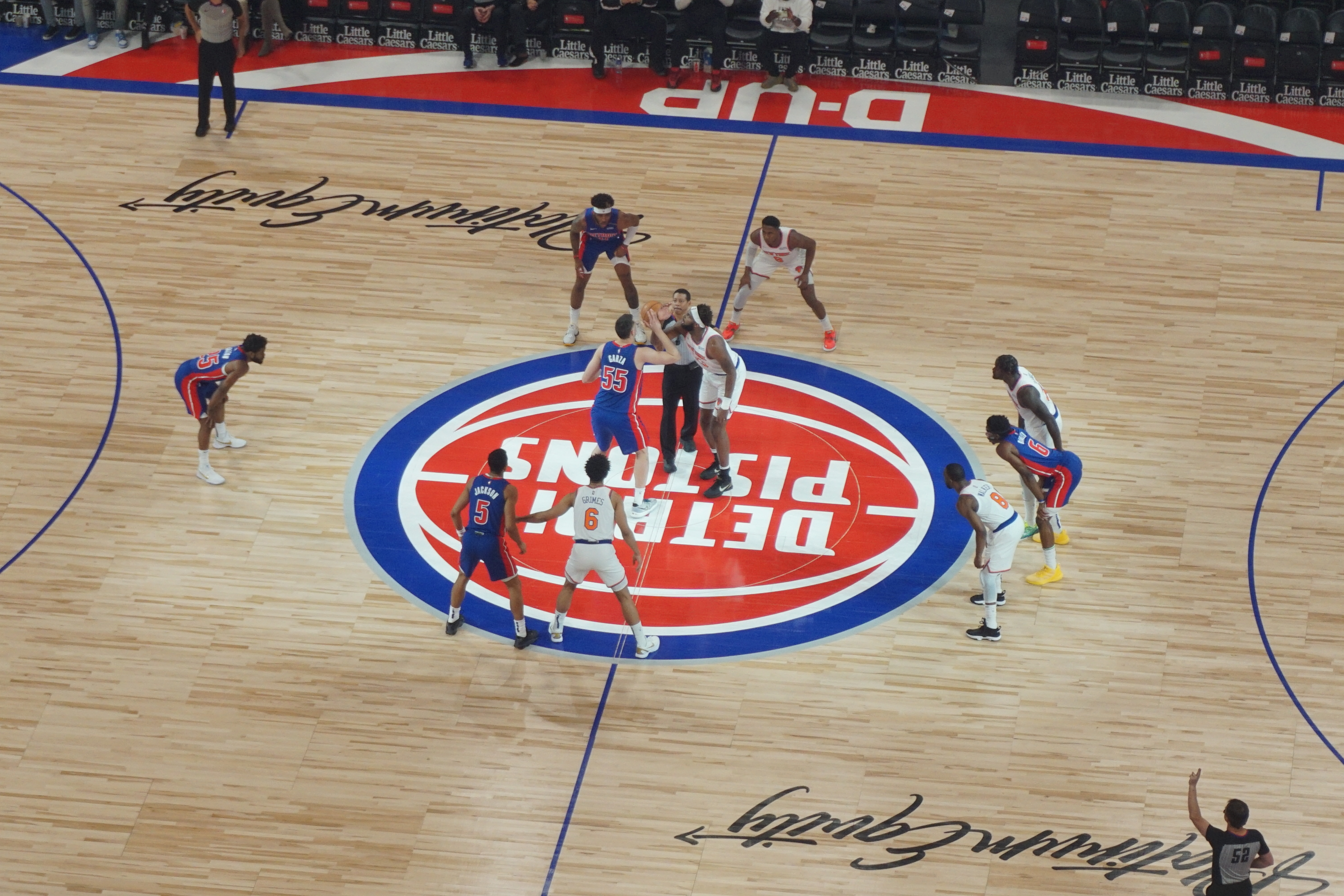
Opening tip of a Pistons game against the New York Knicks in December 2021

In late October 2016, it was reported that the Pistons were considering a move from the Palace of Auburn Hills to Little Caesars Arena as soon as the 2017–18 season, pending city and league approval. Pistons owner Tom Gores, Palace Sports & Entertainment vice chairman Arn Tellem, and Olympia Entertainment had been in negotiations over a partnership since the summer of 2015, with talks intensifying just as the Pistons were set to open their 2016–17 season; the terms also included a possible merger between Olympia and the Pistons' holding company Palace Sports & Entertainment. The Pistons sought land to construct a new headquarters and practice facility within the vicinity of the arena.

On November 22, 2016, the Pistons officially announced that they would move to Little Caesars Arena starting with the 2017–18 season.

On June 20, 2017, Detroit City Council approved the Pistons' move to Little Caesars Arena. On August 3, the NBA Board of Governors unanimously approved the move, which made it official. This marked the first time since 1974 that all four of Detroit's major league sports teams played in the city limits on a regular basis, and the first time since 1978 that the Pistons played in the city of Detroit on a regular basis. The move also marked the first time since 1961 that they and the Red Wings shared the same arena on a regular basis. The move made Detroit the only U.S. city to have four major league sports teams in its downtown district, and one of only two U.S. cities to have four major league sports teams play in a single complex, the other being Philadelphia.

On October 8, as a byproduct of the move, Olympia Entertainment and Palace Sports & Entertainment formed 313 Presents LLC, a joint venture that handles entertainment bookings and event management at the venues owned by both companies.

== Opening ==
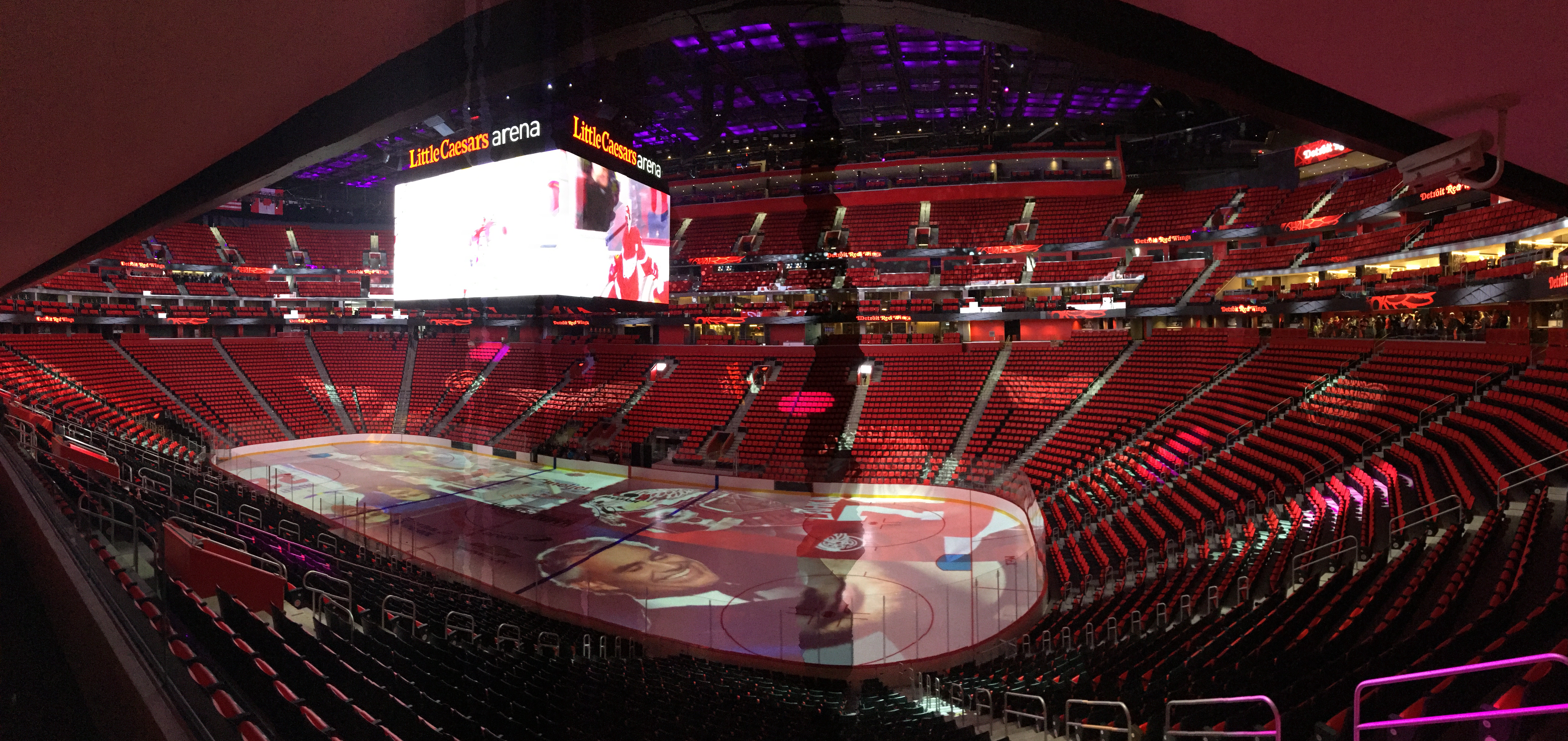
Interior in ice hockey configuration in September 2017.

Little Caesars Arena opened on September 5, 2017, with a ribbon cutting ceremony. The Red Wings played their inaugural game at Little Caesars Arena during the preseason against the Boston Bruins on September 23. They won the game 5–1. They played their first regular season game at the arena on October 5 against the Minnesota Wild. The Red Wings won the game 4–2.

The Pistons played their inaugural game at Little Caesars Arena during the preseason against the Charlotte Hornets on October 4. They lost the game 108–106. Their regular season home opener, also against the Hornets, was played on October 18. The Pistons beat the Hornets 102–90.

Upon moving to Little Caesars Arena, the Pistons unveiled a new basketball court featuring the Platinum Equity logo in place of the LCA logo, making them the only NBA team not to display any arena signage on the court.

In the inaugural season of Little Caesars Arena, concerns were raised over diminished attendance of Red Wings and Pistons games. During the Red Wings' first regular season game at the arena, the sight of a half empty lower bowl was noticeable due to it being nationally televised. When asked about this, Olympia CEO Tom Wilson explained that many fans went to the concourse to check out the arena, noting that the same thing happened during the first event. In early November 2017, the team announced that all of the home games played at that point were sellouts despite the sight of empty seats. Like the Red Wings, the Pistons have had similar issues. When asked about it, they stated that ticket sales were up despite the empty seats.

=== Subsequent arena developments ===
In October 2018, it was announced that all of the arena's red seats would be replaced by black ones. Media outlets noted that the red seats made the sight of empty seats appear more obvious.

In August 2018, Google relocated a regional sales office from Birmingham to leased office space on the Little Caesars Arena property.

== The District Detroit and surrounding area ==
As of 2026, beyond a new Little Caesars world headquarters across from Comerica Park, the Wayne State University Mike Ilitch School of Business neighboring Little Caesars Arena (both of which have ties to the Ilitch family), a renovated Eddystone Building, and an office building, little of the promised redevelopment tied to the arena has materialized. The lack of progress prompted The Guardian to write an article about the situation in 2018. The following year, Real Sports with Bryant Gumbel notably pointed out that zero housing had been built at that point. Construction had and remains stalled on housing that was to adjoin two new arena parking garages, directly across from the arena.

To prevent further demolition of nearby existing buildings, Detroit City Council approved a historic designation in July 2018. In late 2021, the Eddystone reopened as an apartment building. Originally set to open in 2018 as part of the agreement to demolish the next door Park Avenue Hotel, a revised agreement was made in 2019 that included a surety bond to be used in the event of any further delays. It marked just the third building Illitch entities had restored, after the Fox Theatre and Hockeytown Cafe. A new development agreement was approved by Detroit City Council in 2023. However, as of 2026, only one of the 10 proposed projects from that agreement was underway.

== Budget ==
It was originally announced that Little Caesars Arena would cost $450 million to construct, on top of an additional $200 million for constructing the new district. $285 million of the total $650 million cost would be public funds, with $365.5 million in private funding.

On May 23, 2017, it was reported that the cost of the arena had risen to $862.9 million.

In June 2017, a lawsuit was filed by Robert Davis and city clerk candidate D. Etta Wilcoxon, seeking to prohibit the use of school property tax revenue to fund Little Caesars Arena and the new Pistons headquarters without a public vote. The money had originally been approved by voters only for use by Detroit Public Schools Community District to cover operational expenses. District Judge Mark A. Goldsmith dismissed much of the suit, ruling that the plaintiffs lacked standing to sue over the issue. The judge did, however, allow an unrelated count, alleging violations of the Equal Protection Clause by the DPSCD against Davis, to move forward.

The DDA, which owns the arena, uses an estimated $15 million annually in state school taxes to repay Michigan State.

== Naming rights ==
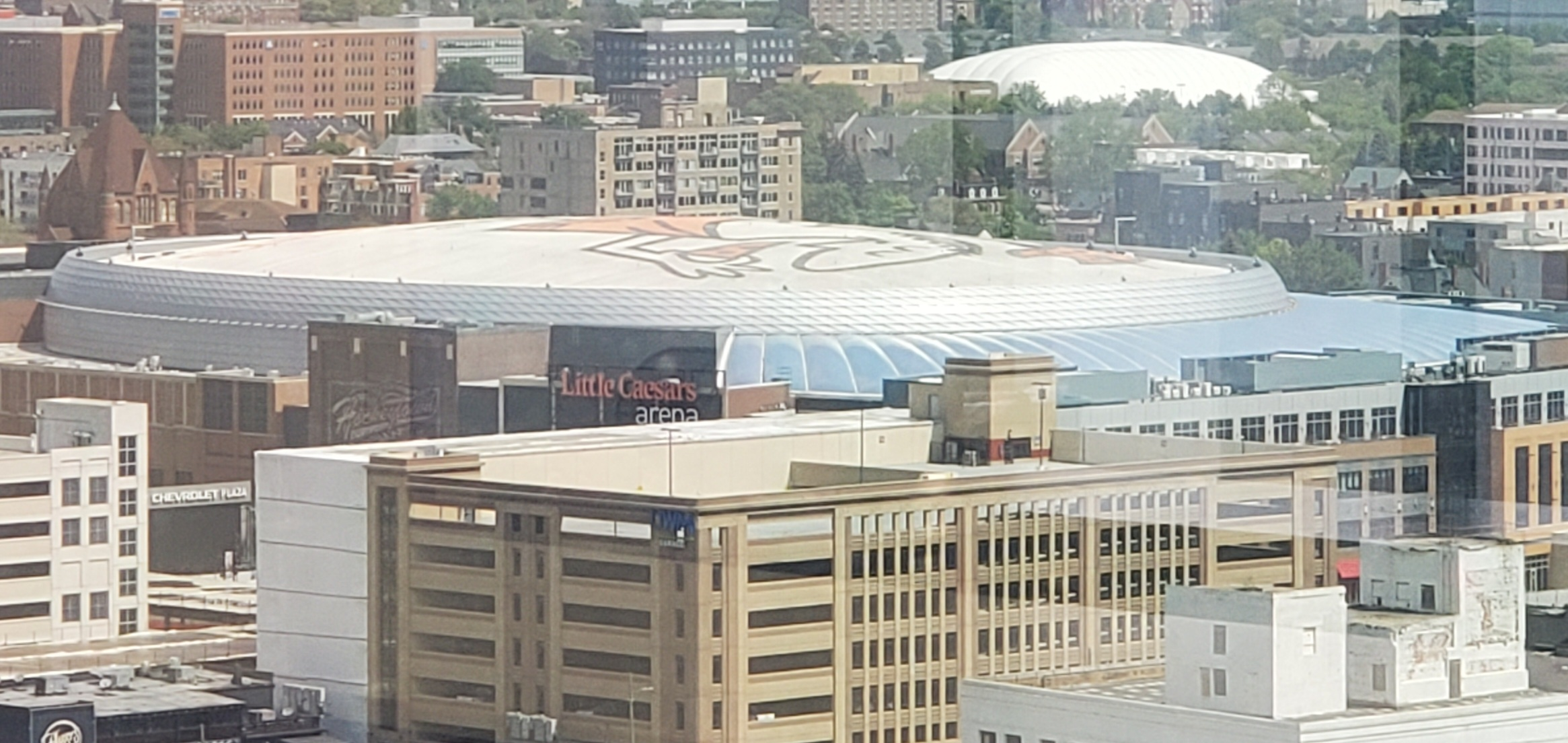
A view of the Little Caesars logo on the top of the arena

On February 11, 2016, it was reported that a local businessman had sold the domain name "littlecaesarsarena.com" three weeks earlier to an international brokerage firm for "five figures", which suggested that Little Caesars, a pizza chain also owned by the Ilitch family, had acquired the naming rights to the new arena. Olympia Entertainment officially announced on April 28 that the venue would be known as Little Caesars Arena. It was also revealed that a large Little Caesars logo would be displayed on the arena's roof; the previous plan for the LED roof was dismissed as being a "placeholder". Chris Ilitch defended the decision of not selling the naming rights to a third-party company, arguing that it was meant to reflect Little Caesars' position as a "legacy business" of the Ilitch family.

The announcement was poorly received. Prior to the unveiling of the official name, some fans suggested to The Detroit News that the arena should have been named after Gordie Howe. Following Howe's death on June 10 an online petition began to circulate requesting that Little Caesars Arena be renamed in honor of the former Red Wings player.

== Events ==
=== Ice hockey ===
The 2017–18 edition of the Great Lakes Invitational moved to the arena for the first time from January 1–2, 2018.

The 2020 NCAA Men's Frozen Four was scheduled to be held at Little Caesars Arena, hosted by Michigan State University. However, on March 12, 2020, the NCAA announced that all championships for the season would be cancelled due to the COVID-19 pandemic.

The Professional Women's Hockey League (PWHL) hosted a game at Little Caesars Arena on March 16, 2024, between its Boston and Ottawa clubs; a crowd of 13,736 watched the game, which was the largest crowd to ever watch a professional women's hockey game in the United States at the time. The PWHL hosted another game at Little Caesars Arena between the Minnesota Frost and the New York Sirens on March 16, 2025; a crowd of 14,288 watched the game. The PWHL hosted a third game at Little Caesars Arena between the Vancouver Goldeneyes and Boston Fleet on January 3, 2026. A fourth game between the New York Sirens and Montreal Victoire was held on March 28. The success of each PWHL Takeover Tour event lead to the creation of the Detroit Clutch.

=== Basketball ===
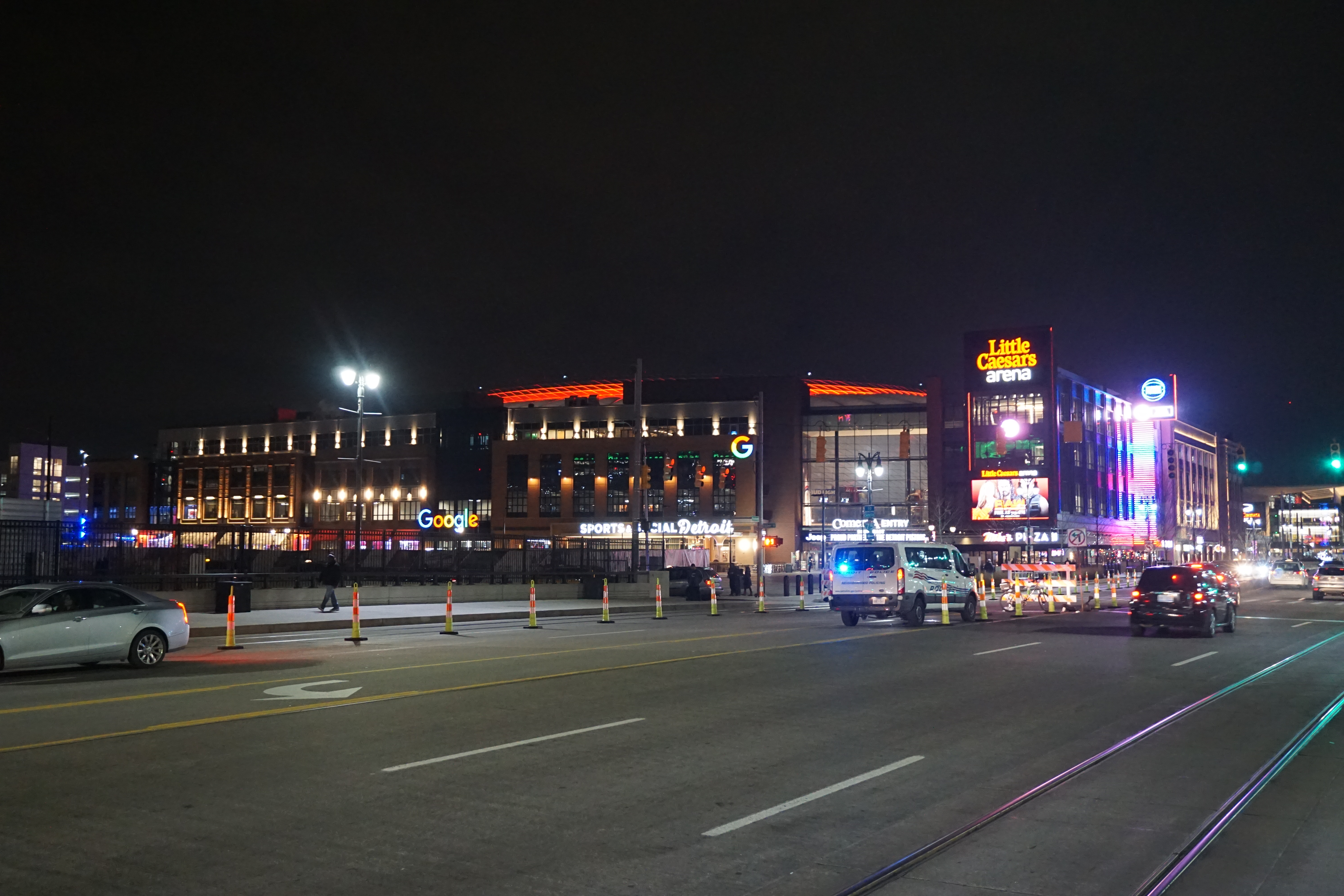
Little Caesars Arena in December 2018.

The first regular season college basketball games held at Little Caesars Arena were played on December 16, 2017, with a doubleheader featuring the Michigan Wolverines playing the Detroit Mercy Titans, and the Michigan State Spartans playing the Oakland Golden Grizzlies.

As part of a contract carried over from Joe Louis Arena, Little Caesars Arena hosted the Horizon League's men's and women's basketball tournaments until 2019, under the blanket title Motor City Madness. Detroit began hosting the men's tournament at Joe Louis Arena in 2016 under a five-year deal, and the women's tournament in 2017. The tournaments moved to Indianapolis for 2020.

Little Caesars Arena hosted first and second-round games during the 2018 NCAA Division I men's basketball tournament, hosted by the University of Detroit Mercy. Although the nearby Palace of Auburn Hills hosted preliminary rounds of the Tournament in 2013, this was the Tournament's first visit to Detroit since the city hosted the 2009 Final Four at Ford Field. The Tournament returned to the arena for the Midwest Regional in 2024. The Tournament will return to the arena again for the Midwest Regional in 2028. The Tournament was originally slated to return in 2021. However, due to the COVID-19 pandemic, the games were relocated.

On July 17, 2019, the Michigan State Spartans and the Oakland Golden Grizzlies announced a six-year deal that extended their series. The games rotated between Little Caesars Arena and the Breslin Center. The first game was played at the arena on December 14, while the second game was played on December 21, 2021. The third and final game was originally scheduled to take place in 2023. However, it was moved to the Breslin Center as the Spartans instead played the Baylor Bears at Little Caesars Arena on December 16. The third game in the series to be played at Little Caesars Arena took place on December 17, 2024. A fourth game took place at Little Caesars Arena on December 20, 2025.

The 2020 Big3 championship game was scheduled to be held at Little Caesars Arena on August 29, 2020. However, on May 18, the Big3 announced that the 2020 season would be cancelled due to the COVID-19 pandemic.

On November 11, 2022, the Michigan Wolverines and the Eastern Michigan Eagles played at Little Caesars Arena. The Wolverines played the Wake Forest Demon Deacons at Little Caesars Arena on November 11, 2025.

A neutral site game between the Duke Blue Devils and the Gonzaga Bulldogs will be played at Little Caesars Arena on February 20, 2027.

Little Caesars Arena will host the Big Ten women's basketball tournament in 2028.

=== Combat sports ===
Little Caesars Arena hosted UFC 218 on December 2, 2017.

The 2022 NCAA Division I Wrestling Championships were held at the arena, hosted by the University of Michigan.

=== Figure skating ===
Little Caesars Arena hosted the 2019 U.S. Figure Skating Championships.

=== Professional wrestling ===
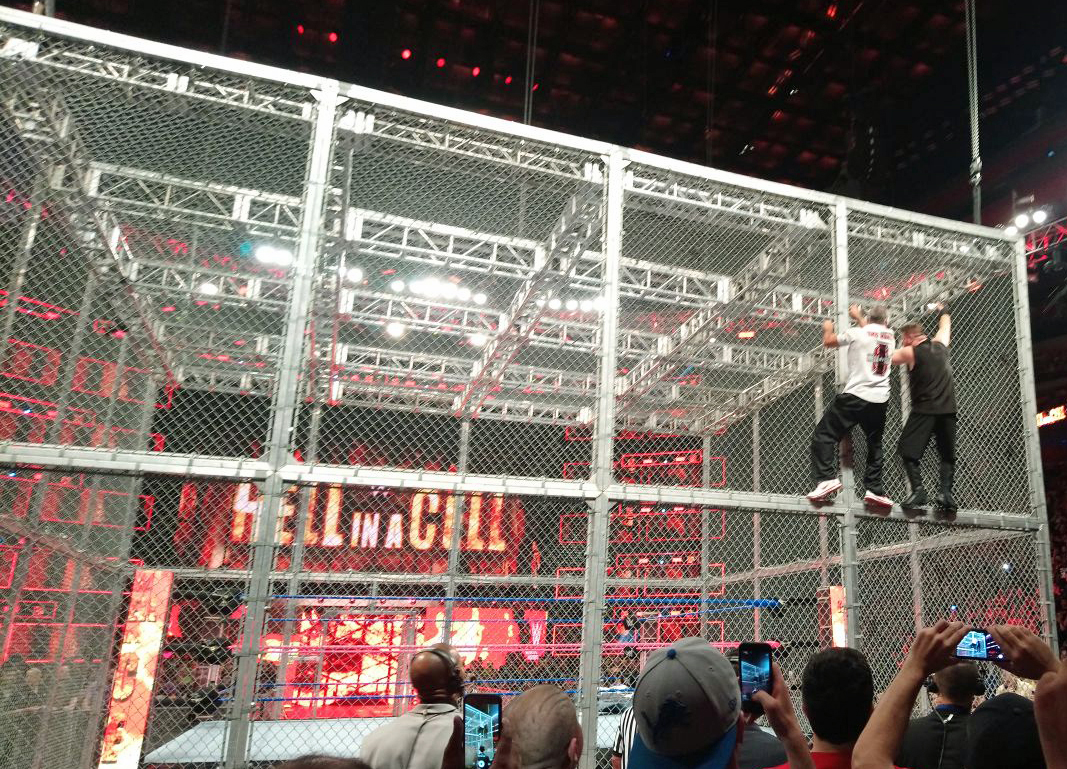
Little Caesars Arena during Hell in a Cell.

In its first WWE event, Little Caesars Arena hosted the pay-per-view Hell in a Cell on October 8, 2017, followed by its first Raw broadcast on March 12, 2018.

Raw returned on December 28 to pre-record an episode aired on New Year's Eve. Nearly a year later, WWE returned for a live SmackDown at the arena on December 27, 2019, and recorded a match for broadcast during Fox's New Year's Eve with Steve Harvey. SmackDown was originally scheduled to return on March 13, 2020, but the show (and all other WWE programming) was called off and relocated to the WWE Performance Center in Orlando due to the COVID-19 pandemic. Raw returned on December 27, 2021, for the final episode of the year.

All Elite Wrestling (AEW) hosted its first event at Little Caesars Arena on June 29, 2022, including a live broadcast of Dynamite, featuring the second Blood & Guts special and match, and tapings of Rampage and Dark: Elevation.

=== Esports ===
In August 2019, Little Caesars Arena hosted the 2019 League of Legends Championship Series Summer Finals. The event featured a performance by Detroit musician Jax Anderson for its opening ceremony.

=== Concerts ===
Little Caesars Arena is often used for concerts. The first one took place on September 12, 2017, with Kid Rock. Other artists have performed at the arena, such as Paul McCartney, Guns N' Roses, Radiohead, Foo Fighters, Kendrick Lamar, Madonna, and Mary J. Blige.

== Reception ==
In June 2018, the arena was named "Sports Facility of the Year" at the 2018 Sports Business Awards.

== See also ==
- List of indoor arenas by capacity

Events and tenants
Preceded by Joe Louis Arena	Home of the Detroit Red Wings; 2017–present	Succeeded by Current
Preceded by The Palace of Auburn Hills	Home of the Detroit Pistons; 2017–present	Succeeded by Current
Preceded by First arena	Home of the Detroit Clutch; 2026–present	Succeeded by Current
Preceded by TD Garden; Boston	Host of WWE Hell in a Cell; 2017	Succeeded by AT&T Center; San Antonio, Texas
Preceded by KeyBank Center; Buffalo, New York	Host of the Frozen Four; 2020 (cancelled)	Succeeded by PPG Paints Arena; Pittsburgh
