= 313 Presents =

American live entertainment company

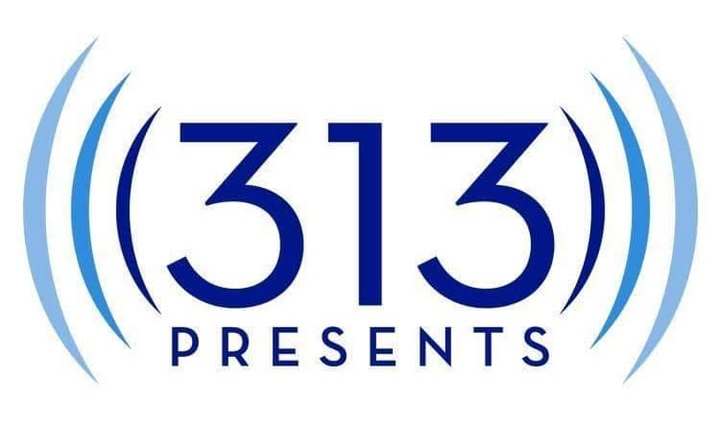
- Type: Joint Venture
- Industry: Entertainment company
- Founded: October 6, 2017; 8 years ago
- Headquarters: 2525 Woodward Avenue; Detroit, Michigan 48201
- Area served: Metro Detroit
- Key people: Keith Dowdican, COO
- Owners: Olympia Entertainment, Palace Sports & Entertainment
- Number of employees: 40 (2019)
- Website: www.313presents.com

313 Presents, LLC is a live entertainment company based in Detroit. It is a joint venture between Olympia Entertainment and Palace Sports & Entertainment (PS&E) that produces and promotes live events held at six of the two companies' venues in southeast Michigan, including the Olympia-owned Little Caesars Arena, Fox Theatre, and Comerica Park, and the PS&E-run Pine Knob Music Theatre, Meadow Brook Amphitheatre, and Michigan Lottery Amphitheatre.

== History ==
Announced on October 6, 2017, 313 Presents was formed as a condition of the Detroit Pistons' move from the Palace-run The Palace of Auburn Hills to the Olympia-run Little Caesars Arena, which resulted in the closure of the Palace.The company takes its name from the area code for Detroit, 313. Crain's Detroit Business estimated that the company held control of 44% of Detroit's major entertainment venues in terms of seats.

It was initially staffed by 40 employees drawn from the two companies. Howard Handler was named as the first official president of 313 Presents on December 5, 2019. Handler previously served as chief marketing officer of Major League Soccer and held various marketing roles for Madison Square Garden, EMI Music, MTV, Virgin Mobile, and the National Football League. Handler left the company March 31, 2026 as part of a planned leadership transition. Following Handler's leave, Keith Dowdican was named Chief Operating Officer of the company.

== Venues ==
Venue	Location	Type	Owner
Meadow Brook Amphitheatre	Rochester	Amphitheater	Palace Sports & Entertainment
Pine Knob Music Theatre	Clarkston	Amphitheater	Palace Sports & Entertainment
Michigan Lottery Amphitheatre	Sterling Heights	Amphitheater	Palace Sports & Entertainment
Little Caesars Arena	Detroit	Arena	Olympia Entertainment
Comerica Park	Detroit	Stadium	Olympia Entertainment
Fox Theatre	Detroit	Theatre	Olympia Entertainment
Sound Board at MotorCity Casino Hotel	Detroit	Theatre	Olympia Entertainment
