= Meadow Brook Amphitheatre =

Outdoor music venue of Oakland University in Rochester Hills, Michigan, US

Coordinates: 42°40′34.5″N 83°12′11.0″W

Meadow Brook Amphitheatre On The Campus Of Oakland University
- Interactive map of Meadow Brook Amphitheatre On The Campus Of Oakland University
- Former names: Meadow Brook Music Festival (1994-2016)
- Address: 3554 Walton Blvd. Rochester Hills, Michigan; United States
- Owner: Oakland University
- Operator: 313 Presents
- Capacity: 7,701

Construction
- Opened: 1964

The Meadow Brook Amphitheatre (originally the Meadow Brook Music Festival) is an outdoor pavilion music venue, located at 3554 Walton Boulevard in Rochester Hills, Michigan on the campus of Oakland University.

The venue seats 7,701 patrons with 2,819 pavilion seats and 4,882 in the lawn.

== History ==
Opened in 1964, Meadow Brook Music Festival was the summer residence of the Detroit Symphony Orchestra through 1991. It remains a venue for various concerts and shows. It also holds graduation ceremonies for various high schools in the area. The venue came under the management of Palace Sports and Entertainment in 1994 where it still remains today.

=== Barns ===
The two remaining of the 10 original barns on Meadow Brook Estate have been situated on what is currently the Meadow Brook Music Festival grounds since they were relocated from their original site in 1935. In 2014, one of the barns was restored while the other was torn down. Both were originally constructed around the 1910s.
