= Mike Ilitch =

American businessman (1929–2017)

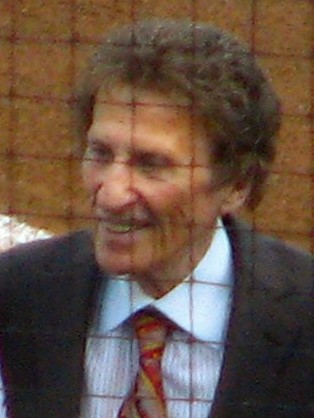
- Ilitch in 2011
- Born: Michael Ilitch; July 20, 1929; Detroit, Michigan, U.S.
- Died: February 10, 2017 (aged 87); Detroit, Michigan, U.S.
- Occupations: Entrepreneur, restaurateur
- Spouse: Marian Ilitch
- Children: 7, including Christopher and Denise

Michael Ilitch Sr. (July 20, 1929 – February 10, 2017), also known as "Mr. I", was an American entrepreneur and restaurateur. He founded Little Caesars in 1959 and later owned two Detroit professional sports franchises: the Detroit Red Wings (1982–2017) of the National Hockey League and the Detroit Tigers (1992–2017) of Major League Baseball.

A second-generation American of Macedonian descent, Ilitch was also active in Detroit real-estate redevelopment, including the restoration of the Fox Theatre and the relocation of his corporate headquarters to that venue.

== Early life ==
Ilitch was born in Detroit in 1929 to Macedonian immigrants Sotir and Sultana Ilitch. His father was a tool and die maker.

A graduate of Cooley High School in Detroit, Michigan, Ilitch served in the U.S. Marine Corps for four years.

== Business career ==
After returning to Detroit, Ilitch signed with the Detroit Tigers organization for a reported $3,000 and played four seasons (1952–1955) in the minors, primarily as a second baseman in the Tigers, New York Yankees, and Washington Senators systems. A knee injury ended his playing career.

After leaving baseball, Ilitch and his wife Marian founded the pizza company Little Caesars Pizza Treat in Garden City, Michigan in 1959. In 1999, the Ilitches established Ilitch Holdings, Inc. to provide their various enterprises with professional and technical services, and held the titles of chairman and vice chairwoman, respectively. The combined total revenues for these enterprises in 2007 reportedly exceeded $1.8 billion. Ilitch had fallen off Forbes magazine's annual list of the "400 Richest Americans", but in 2006 he returned to the list at No. 242. As of December 2016, he was No. 86 on the Forbes 400 and had an estimated net worth of $6.1 billion.

In 2000, Ilitch and his wife appointed two of their children as co-presidents of Ilitch Holdings, Inc.: Christopher Ilitch and daughter Denise Ilitch, an attorney. Christopher Ilitch was named to the new post of CEO and president. Denise Ilitch later left the company "to pursue other opportunities."

== Sports ownership ==
=== Detroit Wheels ===
In an era of experimentation in sports leagues, the Detroit Wheels were a football team that played in the World Football League for the 1974 season. Ilitch was part of a 33-person consortium (including Motown singer Marvin Gaye) that funded the ill-fated WFL team which would not even last the inaugural season in the start-up league.

=== Detroit Caesars ===
The Detroit Caesars were a professional softball team that began play in the American Professional Slow Pitch Softball League (APSPL) in 1977. The team disbanded after the 1979 season.

Prior to formalized professional play, a major sponsor of amateur softball in the Detroit area was Little Caesars, who sponsored the 1970 American Softball Association national championship team. With the formation of a professional league, Ilitch formed a team in his first solo step into professional sports ownership.

The Caesars played at Memorial Field in East Detroit and featured former Detroit Tiger stars Jim Northrup, Mickey Stanley, Jim Price and Norm Cash, along with established softball players such as Mike Nye, Ronnie Ford, Mike Gouin, Bert Smith, and Tex Collins. The team was led by manager Gary Vitto, earning the team two championships before disbanding after the 1979 season. Vitto would go on to serve as General Manager of the Detroit Drive of the Arena Football League and then served in the front office of the Detroit Tigers, both owned by Ilitch.

=== Detroit Red Wings ===
In 1982, Ilitch purchased the Detroit Red Wings from Bruce Norris for US$8 million. Over the next two decades, Detroit returned to perennial playoff contention, winning the Stanley Cup in 1997, 1998, 2002, and 2008 and appearing in the Finals three times between the 1994–95 and 1997–98 seasons. The Red Wings added two more championships in 2002 and 2008. Prior to the 2004–05 NHL lockout, Forbes magazine ranked the Red Wings as the fifth-most valuable franchise in the NHL, despite a $16 million operating loss.

For the 2007–2008 hockey season, the team won the President's Trophy for the best record in the NHL for the sixth time—the most of any NHL team since the President's Trophy was introduced in 1985–1986. The Red Wings made the playoffs for 25 consecutive seasons through 2015–2016. The 25 consecutive playoff berths were the longest active streak of post-season appearances in all of the North American professional sports, before ending in the 2016–2017 season. It is tied for third all-time in NHL history after 29 consecutive appearances by the Boston Bruins from 1967–1968 to 1995–1996, 28 consecutive trips by the Chicago Blackhawks from 1969–1970 through 1996–1997, and is tied with the 25 consecutive appearances by the St. Louis Blues from 1979–1980 to 2003–2004.

=== Detroit Tigers ===
Ilitch purchased the Detroit Tigers in 1992 from fellow pizza magnate Tom Monaghan, the founder of Domino's Pizza. Under his ownership, the Tigers logged losing records in twelve out of thirteen seasons before their turnaround in 2006.

After acquiring the team, Ilitch expressed interest in moving the struggling team to a new ballpark. In 2000, his expectations were realized when the team moved from Tiger Stadium into the newly built Comerica Park. He financed approximately 60% of the $350 million facility; the taxpayers of the greater Detroit-Wayne County and federal grants covered the balance. Various Ilitch Holdings, Inc. enterprises manage and operate Comerica Park and its concessions.

In 2005, the Detroit Tigers hosted MLB's 76th All-Star Game at Comerica Park.

When the Tigers won the AL Wild Card under manager Jim Leyland and general manager Dave Dombrowski in 2006, they made the playoffs for the first time since 1987. They also reached the World Series for the first time since 1984, but the Tigers eventually lost in five games to the St. Louis Cardinals in the World Series. After Dombrowski was brought in, Ilitch steadily agreed to bring in marquee free agents and finance a larger payroll, with the Tigers beginning the 2008 season as one of the highest-salaried teams in baseball.

On September 16, 2011, the Tigers won the Central division title—their first division crown since Ilitch's purchase. On January 24, 2012, Ilitch signed Prince Fielder to a nine-year, $214 million contract, the fourth-largest contract in baseball history. The 2012 Tigers went all the way to the World Series, but were swept by the San Francisco Giants. Prior to the 2013 season, Ilitch agreed to sign starting pitcher Justin Verlander to a seven-year, $180 million contract extension, at the time the highest single offer ever tendered to a major league pitcher. The Tigers won four consecutive AL Central Division titles between 2011 and 2014, but Ilitch's quest for a World Series title was not achieved before his death in 2017.

=== Detroit Drive ===
Ilitch was one of the early team owners in the Arena Football League, starting up the Detroit Drive in 1988. The Drive were one of the most successful teams in the early days of the AFL, both on and off the field. They generally had strong attendance, and the Drive were in the ArenaBowl in every year of their six-year existence, going 4–2 in the title games.

After Ilitch bought the Tigers in 1992 though, he decided he didn't want to own another franchise that would take away fans from the Tigers, so he sold the team and they moved to Worcester, Massachusetts.

=== Awards and honors ===
- Inducted into the Hockey Hall of Fame (builder) in 2003 and the United States Hockey Hall of Fame in 2004.
- Presented with the key to the City of Detroit in February 2008.

== Philanthropy ==
One of Ilitch's first philanthropic efforts was the Little Caesars Love Kitchen, established in 1985. The traveling restaurant was formed to feed the hungry and assist with food provisions during natural disasters. The program has been recognized by former Presidents Bill Clinton, George H. W. Bush and Ronald Reagan, and has served more than 2 million individuals in the United States and Canada.

In 2006, inspired by a veteran returning to civilian life after losing both of his legs in the war, Ilitch founded the Little Caesars Veterans Program to provide honorably discharged veterans with a business opportunity when they transition from service or seek a career change. Ilitch received the Secretary's Award from the U.S. Department of Veterans Affairs for this program in 2007; it is the highest honor given to a civilian by the department.

The Little Caesars Amateur Hockey Program, established by Ilitch in 1968, helped thousands of children. Additionally, Ilitch Charities for Children was founded in 2000 as a non-profit foundation dedicated to improving the lives of children in the areas of health, education, and recreation.

In 2008, the charity was renamed Ilitch Charities and its focus was broadened. The new charity invests in the community's future by supporting innovative, collaborative and measurable programs that promote economic development and spur job growth, as a means to address social issues such as poverty, unemployment, homelessness, and hunger.

In 2015, the Ilitch family announced a $40 million gift to Wayne State University to build the Mike Ilitch School of Business in downtown Detroit.

According to OpenSecrets, reports required by the Federal Election Commission from 2002 to 2005 indicate Ilitch Holdings, Inc. members and business partners have contributed more than $500,000 to political campaigns and PACs.

After civil rights icon Rosa Parks was attacked in her Detroit apartment in 1994, Ilitch quietly paid years of Parks's rent to enable her to live in a safer part of Detroit. He continued doing this until Parks died in 2005. The arrangement became public years later through national news media such as CBS News, CNN, and Stay Inspired News, after Ilitch died in 2017.

== Personal life ==
Ilitch was married to Marian Ilitch (née Bayoff, born 1933), who would go on to become one of the world's wealthiest women. Like Ilitch, his wife was born in Michigan to immigrants from Macedonia. Together, they had seven children: Denise Ilitch (born 1955), an attorney; Ron Ilitch (1957–2018), who died of a fentanyl overdose at the age of 61; Michael Ilitch Jr., a film producer whose credits include Lost in Space (1998) and The Angriest Man in Brooklyn (2014); Christopher Ilitch (born 1965), the current CEO of Ilitch Holdings; Lisa Ilitch Murray, who served as the executive vice president of the Detroit Red Wings; Atanas Ilitch, an actor and singer whose most notable credit was that of the Driller Killer in Slumber Party Massacre II (1987); and Carole Ilitch Trepeck, also an attorney.

The family was presented the key to the City of Detroit by Mayor Kwame Kilpatrick in February 2008, and were the fifth recipients of this award.

== Death ==
Ilitch died on February 10, 2017, at the age of 87 in Detroit, Michigan. The Red Wings wore a patch on their right shoulders in his memory, which featured his nickname "Mr. I" in a rectangle, for the remainder of the season; in addition, the nickname was featured on the ice at Joe Louis Arena, being painted on the center section of the rink, facing the Red Wings' bench.

The Detroit Tigers also wore a black patch with his nickname "Mr. I" in a circle on the right sleeve of their home and away jerseys. In the aftermath of this death, his son Christopher took control of Ilitch Holdings and its properties.

== See also ==
- List of members of the United States Hockey Hall of Fame
- List of members of the Hockey Hall of Fame
