= Marian Ilitch =

American businesswoman, entrepreneur and billionaire (born 1933)

- Born: Marian Bayoff; January 7, 1933 (age 93); Dearborn, Michigan, U.S.
- Occupation: Businesswoman
- Known for: Owner of Detroit Tigers & Detroit Red Wings; Co-founder of Little Caesars Pizza
- Spouse: Mike Ilitch (m. 1955; died 2017)
- Children: 7, including Christopher and Denise

Marian Bayoff Ilitch (born January 7, 1933) is an American billionaire businesswoman, and the co-founder of Little Caesars Pizza with her late husband, Mike Ilitch. As of March 2018, Ilitch was one of the world's seven richest women, according to Bloomberg.

== Personal life ==
She was born in 1933 and raised in Dearborn, Michigan, the daughter of Macedonian immigrants from the village of Bouf (modern day Akritas, Florina, Greece).

She met her future husband Mike Ilitch, also a child of Macedonian immigrants, in 1954 when the two went on a blind date arranged by his father. A year later, they married. The couple has seven children together.

== Business ==
The Ilitches founded Little Caesars Pizza in 1959, which they expanded as a franchise. They have since expanded their interests to include restaurants, entertainment, sports and gaming.

== Casinos and Native American gaming ==
One of the original investors in Detroit's MotorCity Casino, Ilitch realized an opportunity to purchase total interest in the casino resort complex from various minor stakeholders and Mandalay Resort Group in 2005. Marian solely paid $600 million to buy MotorCity Casino from the other investors and for subsequent renovations. Michigan gaming laws prohibit one company from owning more than one Detroit casino property. With Ilitch as owner, MotorCity Casino is reportedly one of the largest independently owned casino enterprises in the United States—likely the largest woman-owned casino in the U.S.

Ilitch and a partner, Michael J. Malik, Sr., have pursued other casino gambling interests outside of Detroit, and from coast to coast. They have acted as a developer of casinos for federally recognized tribes of Native Americans, who have started to use this as a means of generating revenues. They have worked with the Little River Band of Ottawa Indians, developing Little River Casino Resort in Manistee, Michigan. Ilitch has partnered with the Shinnecock Indian Nation in Hampton Bays, New York on plans to develop a casino on Long Island. Ilitch also partnered with Barwest, LLC and the Los Coyotes Band of Cahuilla and Cupeno Indians to develop casinos in Barstow, California.

== Ilitch Holdings, Inc. ==
Ilitch served as vice chairwoman and secretary-treasurer of all of her family's various holdings until 1999, when Ilitch Holdings, Inc. was formed as the parent company for her family's widespread interests. She became chairwoman upon her husband's death.

Ilitch Holdings includes Little Caesars Pizza, Blue Line Foodservice Distribution, Little Caesars Pizza Kit Fundraising Program, Champion Foods, Detroit Red Wings, Detroit Tigers, Olympia Entertainment, Olympia Development and various food service and entertainment venues within these businesses.

Marian and Mike bought the Red Wings for $8 million in 1982. The Detroit Red Wings have won four Stanley Cups under Ilitch family ownership: 1997, 1998, 2002, and 2008. Marian Ilitch and three daughters are among only 12 women to have had their names engraved on the trophy.

Mike Ilitch's Detroit Tigers, a baseball team, logged losing records in 12 out of 13 seasons but turned the team around in 2006. They made the playoffs for the first time since 1987. The Ilitches successfully spearheaded a public/private partnership with the taxpayers of the greater Detroit area to build a new home for the Tigers in downtown Detroit. The $300 million plus Comerica Park opened in April 2000. Ilitch Holdings, Inc. manages the stadium and parking.

== Investing in the community ==
In 1985, Ilitch and her husband established the Little Caesars Love Kitchen Foundation, which consists of a mobile pizza restaurant. The Love Kitchen has fed more than 2 million people, aiding the hungry and disaster victims across the U.S. and Canada. Three presidents, President Ronald Reagan, President George Bush Sr, and President Bill Clinton have recognized the work of the Love Kitchen.

Besides donating millions of dollars to charitable organizations, Ilitch and her husband have established Ilitch Charities for Children, a non-profit organization dedicated to improving the lives of children in the areas of health, education, and recreation. The charity has sponsored numerous programs in the Detroit area, including amateur sports sponsorships for hundreds of thousands of children.

== Ilitch family ==
Ilitch and her husband have seven children: Christopher Paul Ilitch (born June 1965) is CEO and president of Ilitch Holdings, Inc.; Denise D. Ilitch (born November 1955) is an attorney and former co-president, with her brother, of Ilitch Holdings. Other children are Ronald "Ron" Tyrus Ilitch, Michael C. Ilitch, Jr., Lisa M. Ilitch Murray, Atanas Ilitch (born Thomas Ilitch) and Carole M. Ilitch. Ron Ilitch was found dead in his hotel room in February 2018 at the age of 61, having predeceased his mother.

== Legacy and honors ==
- 1988, Ilitch received the Roundtable for Women in Foodservice Pacesetter Award.
- 1994, the Greater Detroit Chapter of the National Association of Women Business Owners recognized Ilitch as one of Michigan's Top 25 women business owners.
- 1996, recognition from American Red Cross of Southeastern Michigan for aiding emergency services and the work of the Red Cross friends.
- 1997, Hospice of Southeastern Michigan Council Crystal Rose Award
- 1999, Michigan Executive of the Year by the Wayne State School of Business Administration
- 2001, inducted into Michigan Women's Hall of Fame
- 2004, she was named one of Detroit's Enterprising Women by the Detroit Historical Society in partnership with the Women's Economic Club, National Association of Women Business Owners, Greater Detroit Chapter and Crain's Detroit Business.
- 2005, Crain's Detroit Business Top Women in Business Honoree.
- 2008, she was elected to the Michigan Sports Hall of Fame and inducted in 2010.
