= City Theatre (Detroit) =

Theatre in Detroit, Michigan, US

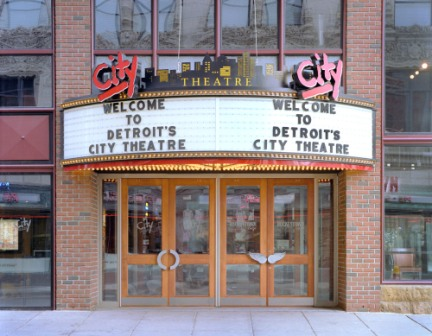
- The entrance and marquee of City Theater in Detroit, Michigan, as seen from the south via Montcalm street.
- Interactive map of City Theatre
- Location: 2301 Woodward Avenue; Detroit, Michigan
- Coordinates: 42°20′19.95″N 83°3′10.08″W
- Owner: Olympia Entertainment
- Capacity: 400
- Type: Indoor theater

Construction
- Opened: 2004

Website
- City Theatre at Olympia Entertainment

City Theatre is a 400-seat theatre in the Hockeytown Café building in Downtown Detroit, Michigan. City theater produces and presents concerts, comedy shows, theatrical performances, and corporate events. Originally called "Second City Theater" the venue was home to a resident Second City comedy troupe. After the departure of Second City the theater adopted its current name "City Theater" in 2004. City Theater is owned and operated by Olympia Entertainment.
