= Little Caesars =

American multinational pizza chain

Little Caesar Enterprises Inc.
- Logo used since 2017

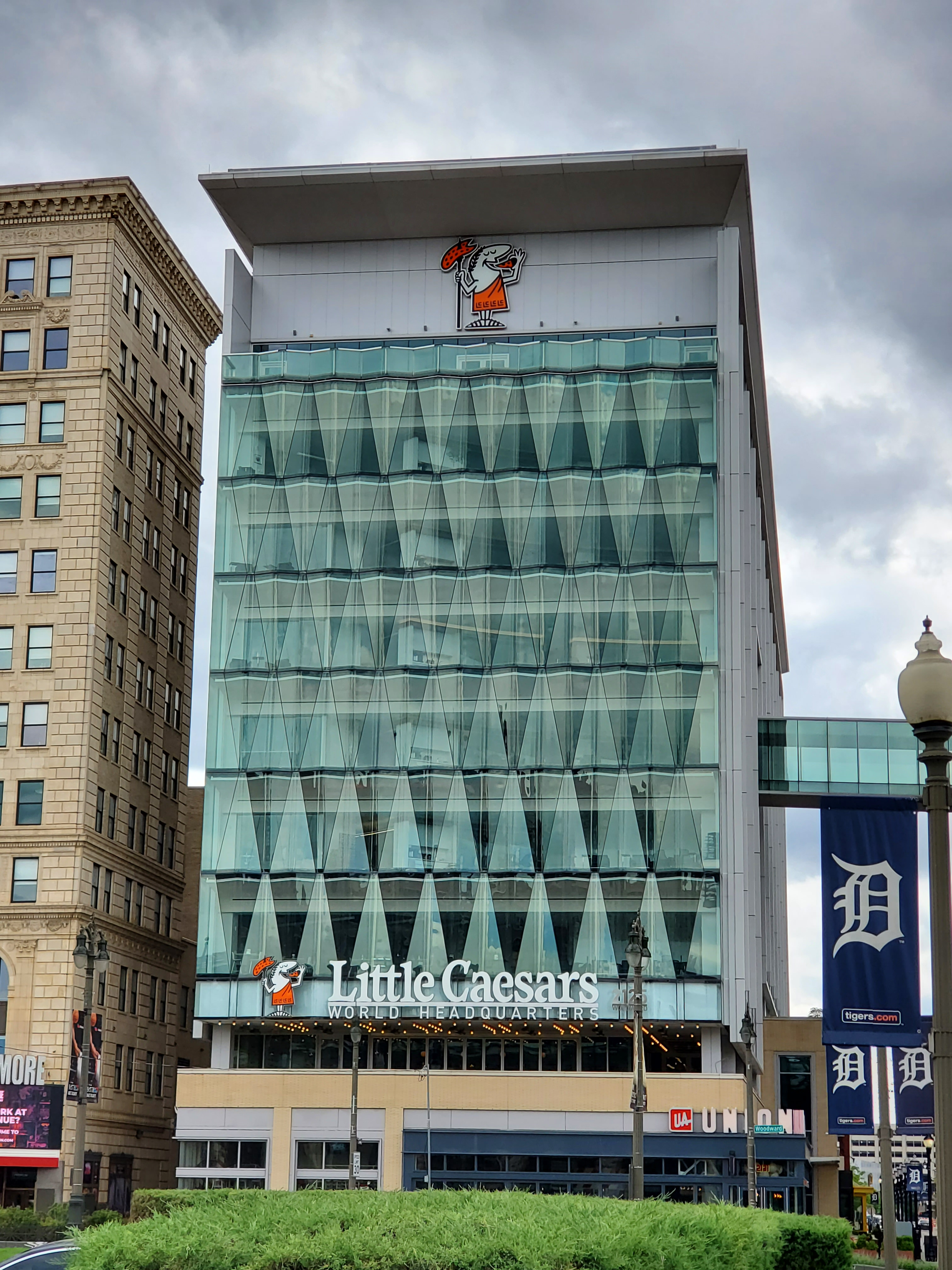
- Headquarters in Detroit (Detroit Tigers banners are in shot due to its proximity to Comerica Park)
- Trade name: Little Caesars
- Formerly: Little Caesar's Pizza Treat (1959–1971)
- Type: Private
- Industry: Restaurant Franchising
- Genre: Fast food Pizzeria
- Founded: May 8, 1959; 67 years ago Garden City, Michigan, U.S.
- Founders: Mike Ilitch; Marian Ilitch
- Headquarters: Detroit, Michigan, U.S.
- Number of locations: 5,463 (2017)
- Area served: List: United States (including Puerto Rico and Guam); Bahamas; Bahrain; Barbados; Cambodia; Canada; Chile; Colombia; Costa Rica; Dominican Republic; El Salvador; Guatemala; Honduras; India; Jamaica; Kuwait; Malaysia; Mexico; Nicaragua; Panama; Peru; Portugal; Saudi Arabia; Spain; Trinidad and Tobago; Turkey; United Arab Emirates
- Key people: David Scrivano (President and CEO); Paula Vissing (COO)
- Products: Pizza, chicken wings, breadsticks, soft drinks
- Owner: Ilitch Holdings
- Website: littlecaesars.com

Little Caesar Enterprises Inc. (LCE) (doing business as Little Caesars) is an American multinational chain of pizza restaurants founded in 1959. Little Caesars is the third largest pizza chain by total sales in the United States behind Domino's and Pizza Hut. It operates and franchises pizza restaurants in the United States and internationally in Asia, Europe, North America, and South America. The company is owned by Ilitch Holdings, and headquartered in Detroit, Michigan.

== History ==
Little Caesars Pizza was founded on May 8, 1959, by the married couple Mike Ilitch and Marian Ilitch. The first location was in a strip mall in Garden City, Michigan, a suburb of Detroit, and named "Little Caesar's Pizza Treat". The original store closed in October 2018, relocating down the street to a new building in nearby Westland.

The first Little Caesar's franchise location opened in 1962 in Warren, Michigan, and was still called Little Caesar's Pizza Treat. The same year the Little Caesar's logo became a 3D figure and was used in outdoor signage.

Caesar's design used from 1988 to 2017

The company is well known for its advertising catchphrase "Pizza! Pizza!", which was introduced in 1979. The phrase refers to two pizzas being offered for the comparable price of a single pizza from competitors. Initially, the pizzas were served in a single long package (a piece of corrugated cardboard in 2-by-1 proportions, with two pizzas placed side by side, then slid into a form-fitting paper sleeve that was folded and stapled closed). In 1988, they introduced a square deep-dish pizza called “Pan! Pan!”. Customers could purchase the “Pan! Pan!” pizzas as part of the 2-for-1 deal or mix and match with one pan pizza and one original round pizza. Little Caesars has since discarded the unwieldy packaging in favor of typical pizza boxes. For a time, in addition to pizza, the menu included hot dogs, chicken, sub sandwiches, shrimp, and fish.

In the mid-1980s, Little Caesars opened several family entertainment centers in the Detroit and Chicago area with Little Caesars branding, initially being named Little Caesars Family Fun Pizzeria. Several of these locations were formerly Chuck E. Cheese's Pizza Time Theatre locations owned by Mike Ilitch. Little Caesars Family Fun Pizzeria would be rebranded into Caesarland by the mid-1990s, which featured play places similar to Discovery Zone. Caesarland would operate until 2011, when the last locations would close due to declining business.

In 1997, the chain introduced shaker boards to advertise its "Hot-N-Ready Pizza", a large pepperoni pizza sold for $5. The concept was successful enough to become a permanent fixture of the chain, and Little Caesars' business model has shifted to focus more on carryout.

In 1998, Little Caesars filled what was then the largest pizza order, filling an order of 13,386 pizzas from the VF Corporation of Greensboro, North Carolina.

Little Caesars was among the first to use a new kind of speed-cooking conveyor oven, the "Rotary Air Impingement Oven".

On December 10, 2014, Little Caesars announced plans for a new eight-story, 205,000-square-foot Global Resource Center to be built at Woodward Avenue and Columbia Street in downtown Detroit. Intended to double the size of Little Caesars World Headquarters Campus, the new building's location was chosen near the Fox Office Center building, which houses both the Fox Theatre, and 186,000 square feet of office space for Little Caesars, and other Ilitch-affiliated ventures. An overhead pedestrian bridge over Columbia Street was planned to connect the Fox with the new Little Caesars Global Resource Center and workspace for an additional 600 jobs to be brought to Detroit over time. On January 31, 2016, it was announced that the proposed new Little Caesars Pizza Global Resource Center had grown by one floor to be a nine-story building at Woodward and Columbia Street. The building was scheduled to be completed in 2018, but in October of that year, was pushed back due to construction delays.

In 2017, to coincide with the opening of Little Caesars Arena, the company launched a slightly updated logo, which removed Caesar's chest hair, updated the wreath, and updated the toga to have hidden letters spelling "LC" for "Little Caesars". The company also started using the updated Caesar in its advertising, replacing the more cartoonish Caesar that had been used in ads since 1988.

== Marketing ==
Little Caesars is legally prevented from using its “Pizza! Pizza!” slogan in Canada since the unaffiliated Pizza Pizza restaurant chain holds the countrywide trademark for its name. Instead, Little Caesars uses other slogans such as "Two Pizzas!" and "Delivery! Delivery!".

== Franchising ==
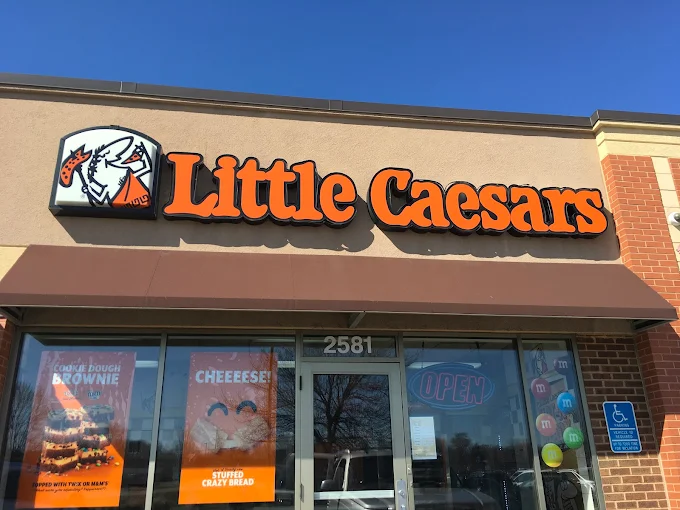
A Little Caesars branch in Mounds View, Minnesota

Little Caesars locations in the world as of May 2025

Little Caesars sold its first franchise in 1962 and, by 1987, had restaurants in all 50 states. Throughout the 1990s and early 2000s, Little Caesars were commonly found in Kmart stores, more specifically in Big Kmarts and Super Kmart. Little Caesars pizza was also included in many older, remodeled Kmart locations. The first Kmarts with Little Caesars were built in Garden City, Michigan. After Kmart's bankruptcy issues, many Kmarts replaced the Little Caesars restaurants with their own branded "K-Cafe". However, as of 2021, two Little Caesars/Kmart locations remain– in Guam and USVI.

Between 2008 and 2015, Little Caesars was the fastest-growing pizza chain in the United States. As of 2017, the company had 5,463 locations including U.S. and international units.

The estimated total investment necessary to begin the operation of a Little Caesars Franchise ranges from $378,700 to $1,695,500.

=== International growth ===
By 1987, the company was operating across the Northern United States, purchasing the Mother's Pizza chain out of receivership in Canada, the United States, and the United Kingdom in 1989 (left between 2000 and 2022). As of 2022, the company is present in Canada (some Canadian cities had locations since 1969), Honduras, Nicaragua, Saudi Arabia, Costa Rica, Dominican Republic, Mexico (since 2006), Colombia, Panama, Peru, Turkey, Guatemala, Barbados, Bahamas, El Salvador, Jamaica, Bahrain, Trinidad and Tobago, Chile, Spain, and Singapore.

The Little Caesars brand began operating in the Philippines in the 1990s, but it gradually closed down in the 2000s. It re-entered the market on January 25, 2019, launching under a new franchisee and new branch in Ermita, Manila.

In 2019, Little Caesars restaurants in Australia closed their doors and went into administration, having entered the Australian market in 2014.

Little Caesars entered the Indian market on January 29, 2020, opening two stores in Ahmedabad, Gujarat.

In March 2022, Little Caesars left Russia due to the War in Ukraine.

In December 2022, the company re-entered the UK market after 22 years, opening a store in Derby, followed by stores in Greenford and Nottingham in 2024.By 2026 however they would quietly and slowly close down all of their locations, with the Greenford branch being the last location to shut its doors, exiting the UK market once more after 4 years.

In early September 2024, Little Caesars announced that it would be exiting Singapore, with the last day of operations for the chain being September 30. The last store was in Funan, after the gradual closure of the chain's six other branches throughout the island.

In 2022, Little Caesars had plans to expand into France, Germany, and Portugal.

In July 2025, Little Caesars expanded to the United Arab Emirates, opening its first branch in Al Barsha, Dubai.

In May 2026, Little Caesars expanded to Malaysia, opening its first branch in Damansara Utama.

== Products ==
An Ultimate Supreme pizza from Little Caesars

Little Caesars produces a variety of pizzas. Several core menu items are part of the HOT-N-READY menu, designed to make popular items available for immediate carry-out, while others are considered either specialty pizzas or custom pizzas. In 2013, they added the Deep! Deep! Dish Pizza, a Detroit-style pizza, to the menu.

Additional entrée options include flavored Caesar Wings and bread, such as Crazy Bread and Italian Cheese Bread. Select locations offer salads. All Little Caesars locations carry Pepsi products. Little Caesars also sells brownies.

In 1996, they introduced Pizza by the Foot, a three-foot-long rectangular pizza. The product has since been discontinued; however, its equivalent, Pizza by the Meter, has been sold in the Saudi Arabian market since the 90s and is a top-rated product. On occasion, Little Caesars releases limited time offers. In 2014, they introduced the Soft Pretzel Crust Pizza, and in 2015, the "Bacon Wrapped Deep! Deep! Dish Pizza."

In May 2019, Little Caesars began testing a pizza with meatless sausage made by Impossible Foods.

In June 2020, Little Caesars reintroduced Stuffed Crazy Bread. They first introduced it in 1995. The original Crazy Bread was first introduced in 1982.

As of May 15, 2023, Little Caesars introduced Crazy Puffs in Canada as a handheld snack made with pizza dough filled with cheese, pepperoni, and sauce, topped with garlic sauce and herbs. They later launched in the U.S. on March 11, 2024, offering both pepperoni and cheese varieties.

== Sponsorships ==
In September 2022, Little Caesars became the official pizza sponsor of the National Football League.

== See also ==
- List of pizza chains of the United States
