= MotorCity Casino Hotel =

Casino and hotel in Detroit

Coordinates: 42.339°N 83.069°W

- Interactive map of MotorCity Casino Hotel
- Location: 2901 Grand River Avenue Detroit, Michigan 48201
- Opened: December 14, 1999; 26 years ago (casino); November 2007; 18 years ago (hotel tower)
- Theme: Future Retro
- No. of rooms: 400 (33 premium suites)
- Gaming space: 100,000 sq ft (9,300 m^{2})
- Permanent shows: Sound Board
- Casino type: Land-based
- Owner: Marian Ilitch
- Operating license holder: Detroit Entertainment, L.L.C.
- Public transit access: DDOT 2, 3
- Website: Official website

MotorCity Casino Hotel is a casino hotel located in Detroit, Michigan, United States. It was opened on December 14, 1999.

The $825 million MotorCity complex contains a historic building that housed the Wagner Baking Company, makers of the brand Wonder Bread. The complex houses a 100,000 square-foot casino with approximately 2,500 slot machines, and 59 table games; a 13,000-square-foot spa; 67,000 square feet of meeting and convention space; Sound Board, a live music theater with a capacity of 2,400 people; and a luxury hotel with 400 guest rooms and suites.

Originally opened by Mandalay Resort Group, their 53.5% stake was later purchased on April 12, 2005, for $525 million by Marian Ilitch, who already owned 25% of MotorCity.

== Architecture ==
The building, located on Grand River Avenue at the Lodge Freeway (M-10), was designed by architect Walter W. Ahlschlager. As part of the property's renovation as a casino, the terracotta elements of the former bread bakery were restored to their original condition, preserving the features of the building.

Chip Foose, a custom car designer and television personality, was a member of the design team. Foose's influence is reflected strongly in the sweeping roof design, a 304-foot-long stainless steel undulating ribbon produced by Quality Metalcraft Inc., under the direction of Michael Chetcuti. It is considered a reference to Detroit's automotive history. Foose says it was inspired by the door molding on a 1957 Chevrolet Bel Air. The roof ranges in height from 3.5 feet to 10 feet and weighs over 181 tons.

== Casino ==
The casino features more than 100,000 square feet of gaming space. It includes approximately 2,400 slot machines, approximately 59 table games, and two poker rooms.

The interior of the casino is notable for Foose's design of the ceiling, which features large, extruded aluminum-like beams and thousands of multi-color LEDs that can display video with more than 256,000 colors. The style is referred to as "Future Retro," and the ceiling resembles a giant custom car radiator.

In a nod to Detroit's Motown and other musical roots, the pillars of the Amnesia event space are designed to resemble bass clefs. The five-bar musical staff is used as a design element on items ranging from slot machine bases to signage throughout the property. Zebrawood, a wood often used in guitar construction, is incorporated into the hotel lobby and guestrooms.

== Sound Board ==
With a capacity of 2,400, Sound Board is a performance venue located inside the MotorCity Casino. Since opening with a concert by Detroit native Anita Baker on October 23, 2008, Sound Board has hosted entertainment and musical performers. The theater also hosts events such as live boxing and major product launches.

The sound, lighting, and video equipment includes a d&b Line Array Sound System with Yamaha PM7 Rivage audio consoles, an HES Road Hog Full Boar lighting console, more than 50 moving lights and DL-3 lighting fixtures.

== Photo gallery ==
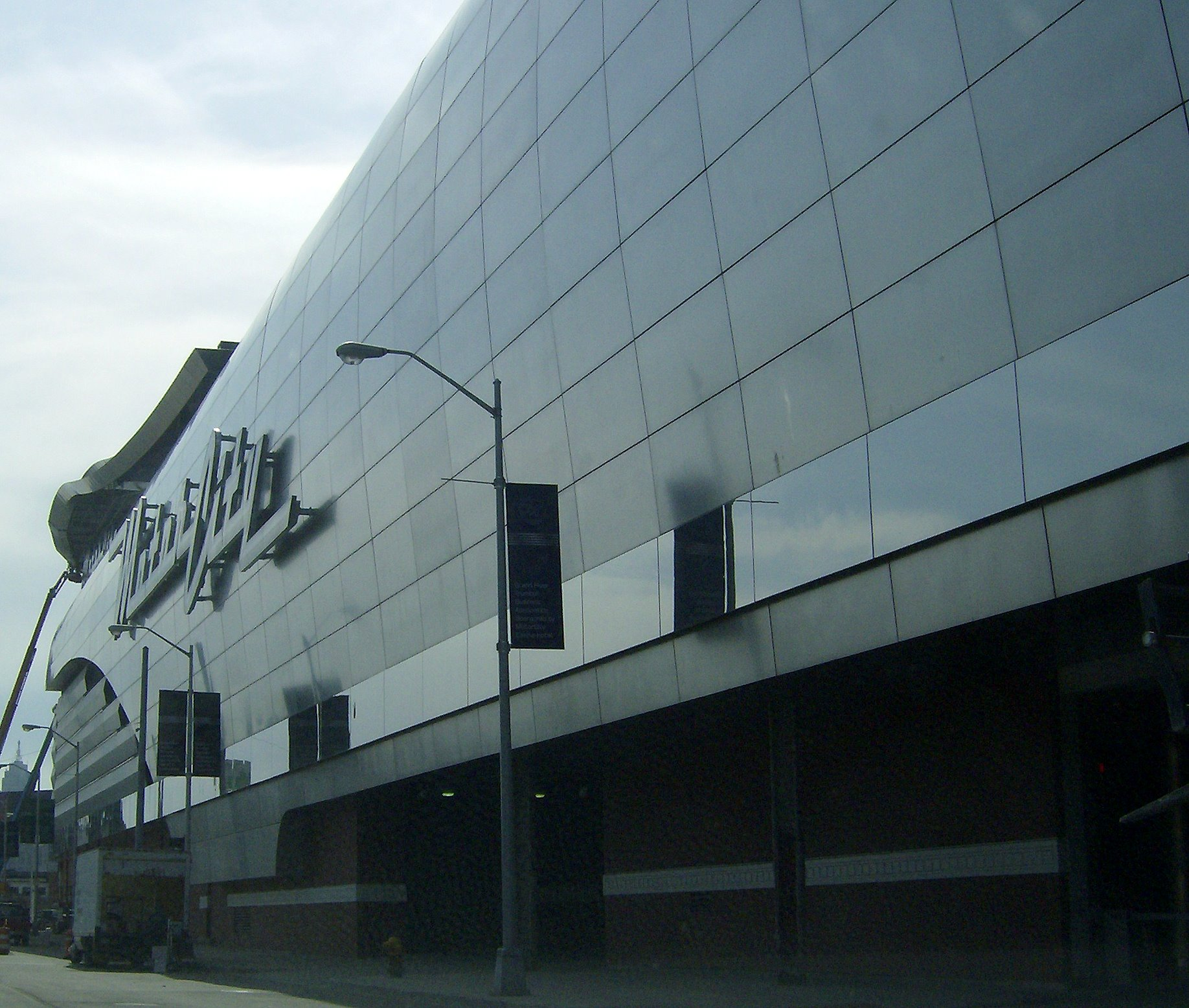
Chrome panels accent original tile work on the Grand River façade

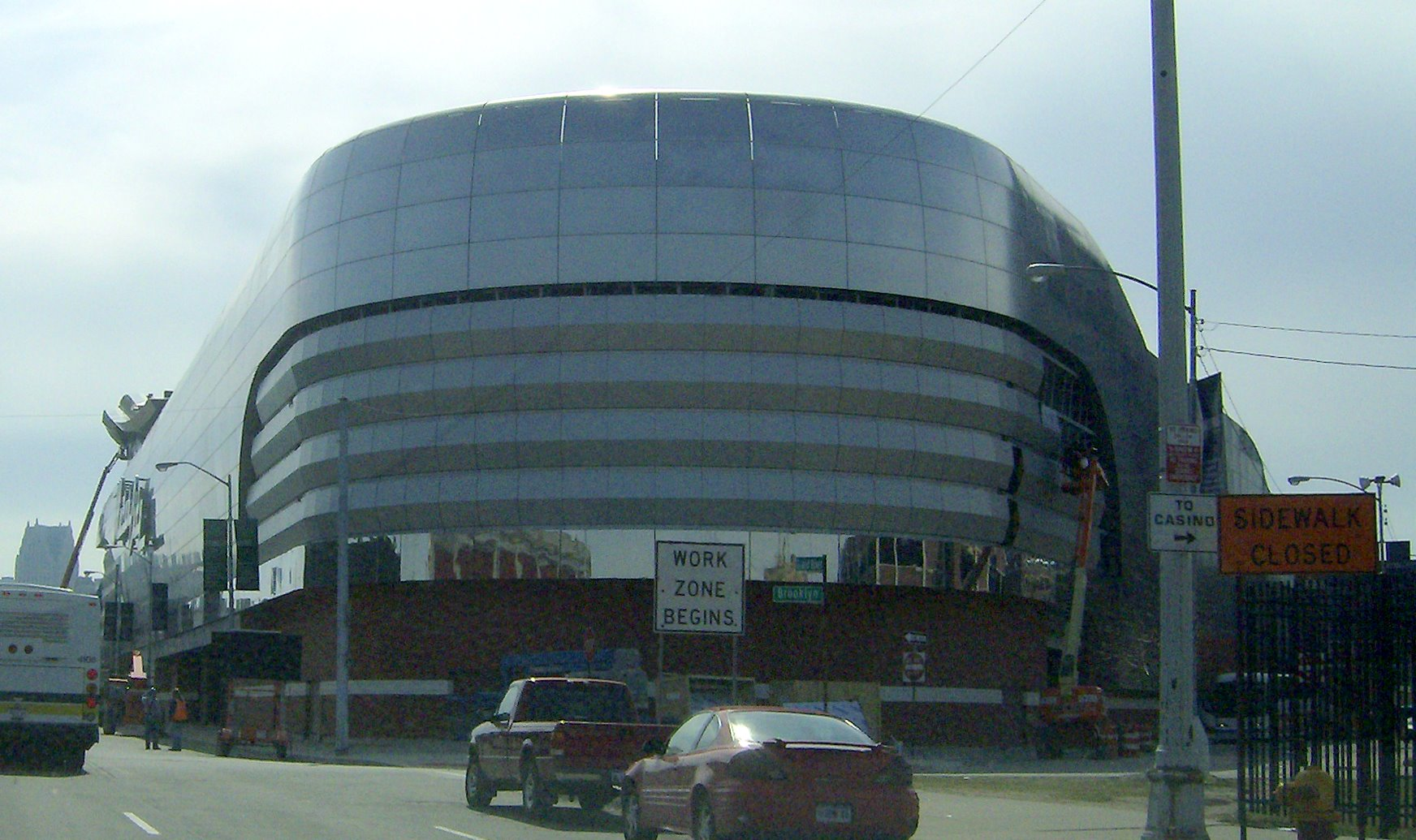
Casino details designed to resemble a classic 1950s tailfin-style car

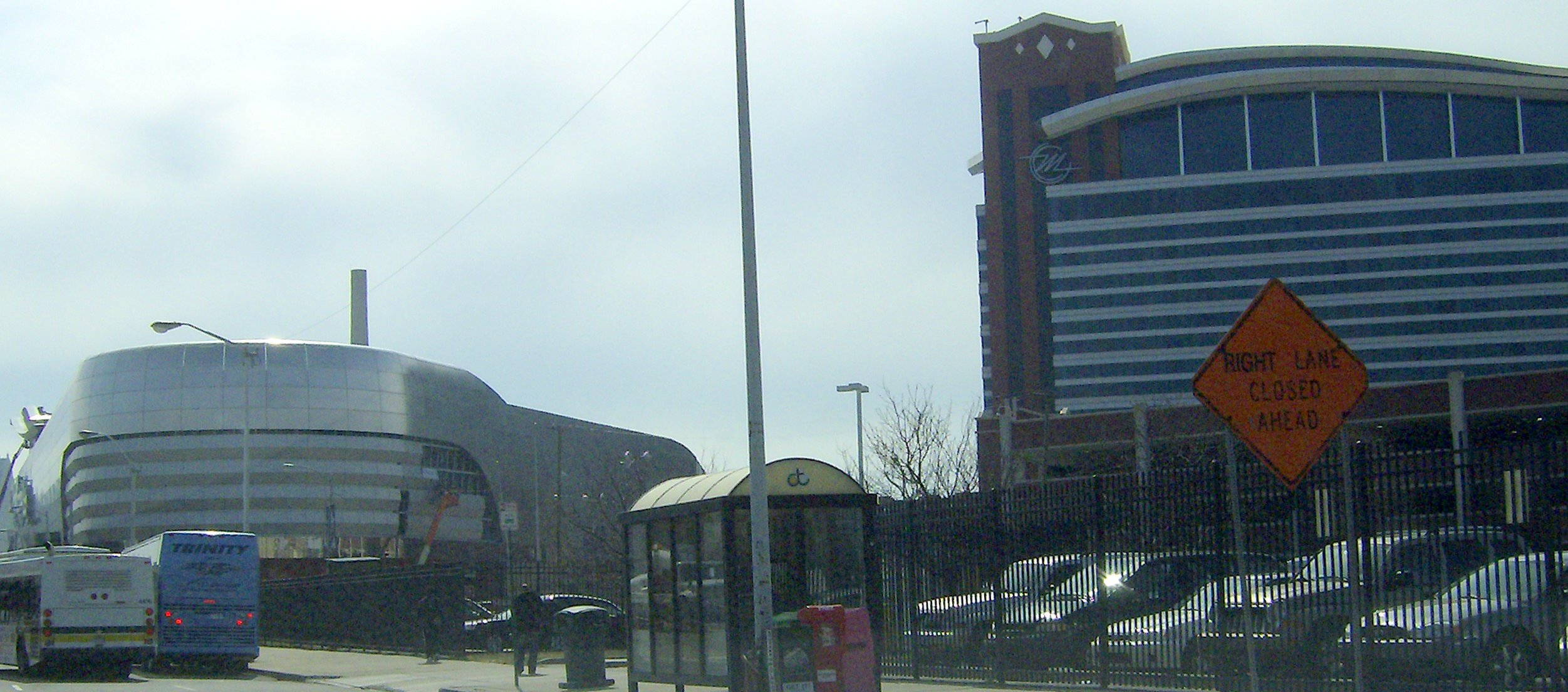
Looking southwest with casino on the left and the high-rise hotel addition to the right

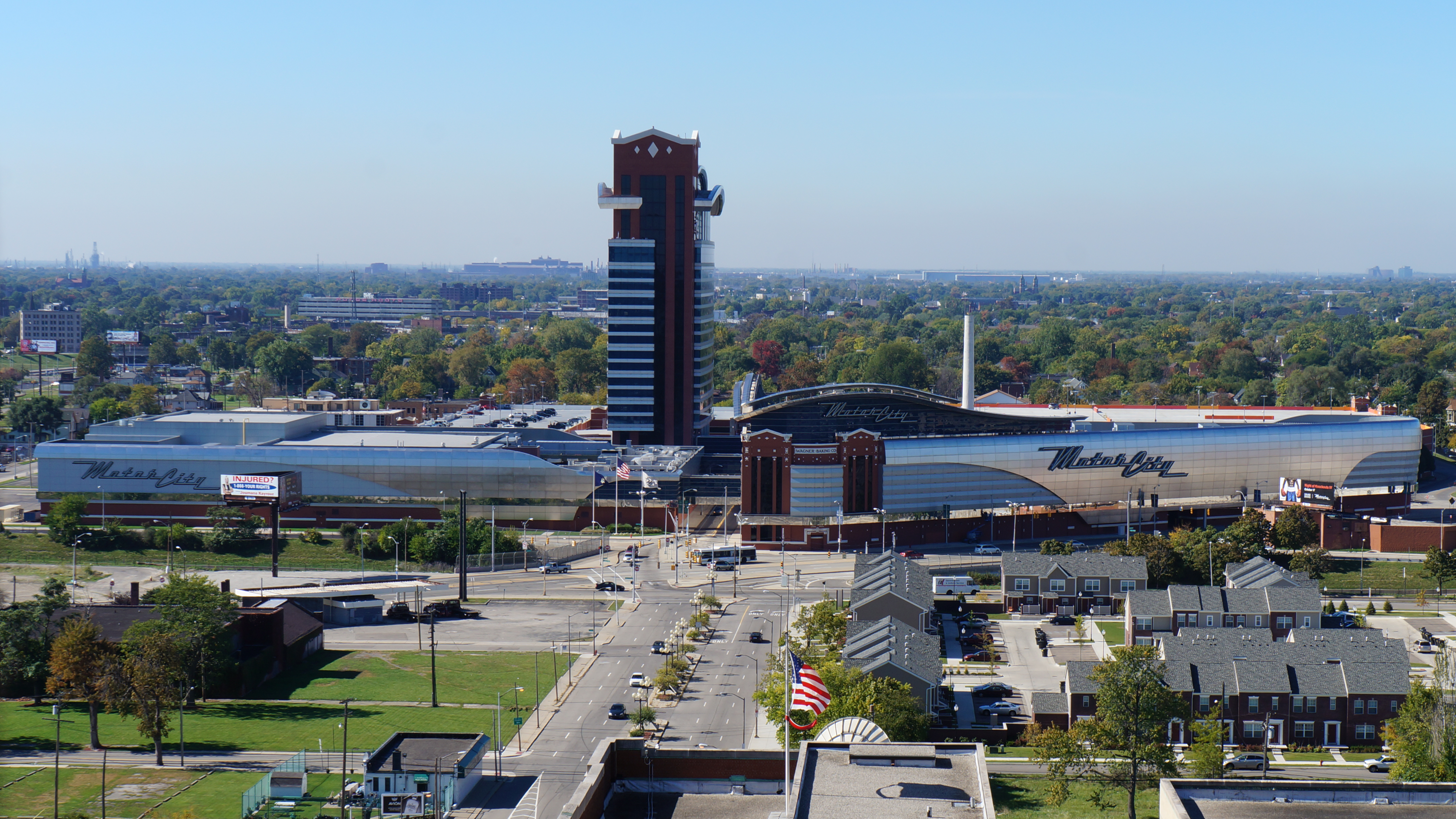
The casino complex looking west

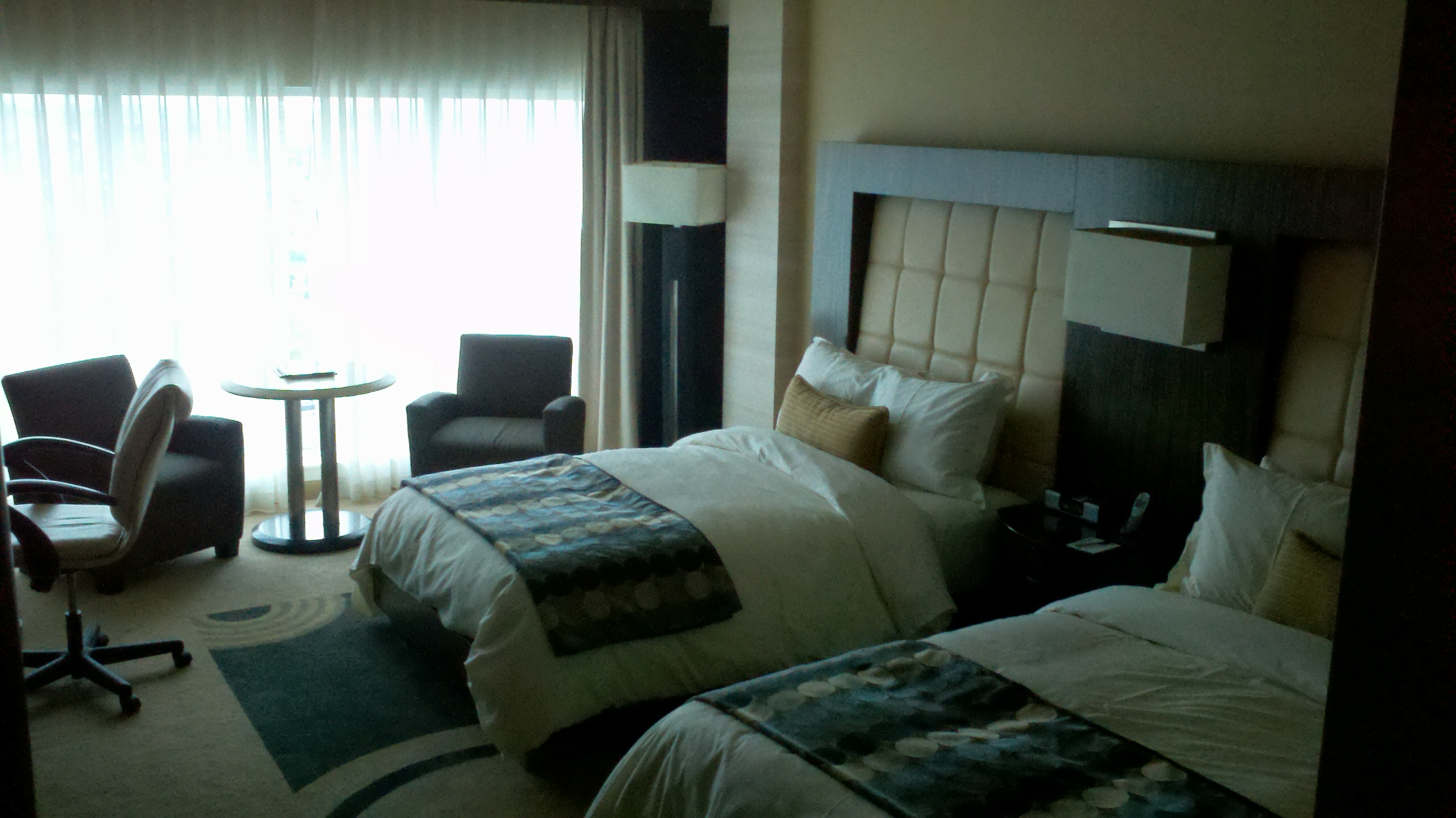
Guest room at the hotel

== See also ==
- Caesars Windsor
- Hollywood Casino at Greektown
- MGM Grand Detroit
- List of casinos in Michigan
- List of integrated resorts
- Wikimedia graph of Detroit's casino revenues
