= Emerald Theatre =

Theatre in Mt. Clemens, Michigan, US

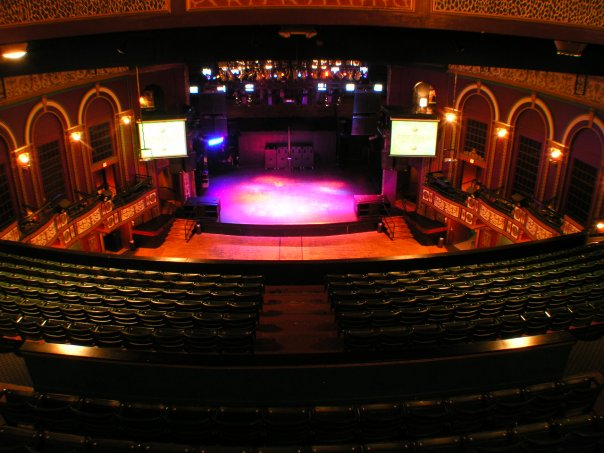
- Grand opening in 2000
- Interactive map of Emerald Theatre
- Former names: Macomb Theatre; Club Hollywood; Great Lakes Dinner Playhouse; JD's Macomb Theater; Emerald Ballroom; Macomb Music Theatre
- Location: 31 N. Walnut St. Mt. Clemens, Michigan, United States
- Capacity: 1,640 (General admission)
- Type: Concert and live performance venue

Construction
- Opened: 1921
- Renovated: 2000, 2016
- Architect: C. Howard Crane

Website
- theemeraldtheatre.com

The Emerald Theatre is a live multi-use entertainment and concert venue located in downtown Mt. Clemens, Michigan.

== The venue ==
The 23,000 square foot venue contains a theater with a general admission capacity of 1,640 on three levels, with cabaret-style terraced seating and a dance floor that both convert to theater-style seating. The mezzanine level contains permanent theater seating and a standing room third floor grand balcony. The venue hosts a variety of local and national concert, comedy, corporate, weddings and entertainment events.

== History ==
Opened in 1921 as a grand movie palace and vaudeville live performance venue, the theater was known as the Macomb Theatre until 1987, when it went through a series of name, use and ownership changes.

The theatre was designed by noted theater architect, C. Howard Crane, who also designed Detroit's Orchestra Hall and Fox Theatre. One of the first grand movie palaces in the metropolitan Detroit area, the historic theater is the largest venue of its type in Macomb County.

From 2000 to 2012, the venue was known as the Emerald Theatre, and although one of metropolitan Detroit's most successful concert venues during that time, in July 2012, the theater was padlocked in foreclosure by Talmer Bank and Trust, closing the venue.

On November 5, 2012, the theater was purchased and renovations began on the historic property at an anticipated cost in excess of $2 million. Under new ownership, it was renamed the Macomb Music Theatre. The newly renovated venue opened its doors on April 13, 2013, with a sold out jazz concert featuring Grammy award winners and nominees Gerald Albright, Norman Brown and Alex Bugnon, followed by the Grammy award-winning comedy duo Cheech & Chong on April 21, 2013, but it closed after a short run in 2014 as a result of a falling out between the partners.

New owners purchased the property in February 2016, and after further restoration and repairs including a new marquee, redesigned Rock Room bar, and a revival of the Emerald Theatre name, the venue reopened in December 2016, once again hosting live concerts, corporate, wedding and other private and entertainment events.

== Productions ==
Notable live events at the venue include the taping of VH1's "Kid Rock Christmas", featuring Kid Rock and Carmen Electra, and the Sports Illustrated Super Bowl XL Party in 2006. Other artist performances at the venue include, among others, Uncle Kracker, Funkadelic, Vince Neil, Mike Posner, The Cult, The Insane Clown Posse, Styx, The Psychedelic Furs, Motörhead, Pearl Jam, and Michael Bolton.
