= Film Exchange Building =

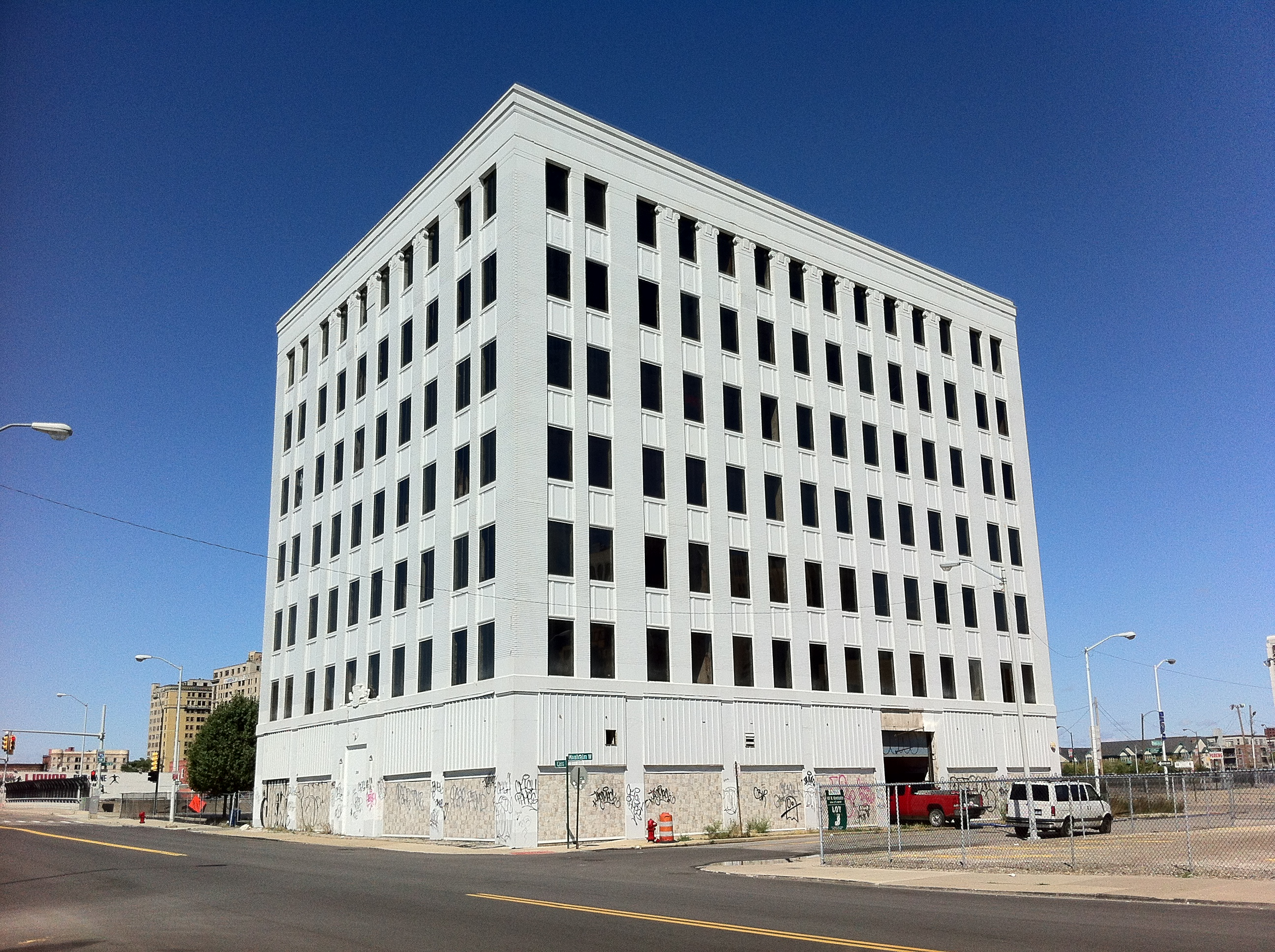
- The Film Exchange Building (2012)
- Alternative names: FEB

General information
- Type: Low-rise building
- Architectural style: Art deco Art Moderne
- Location: Detroit, Michigan, 2310 Cass Ave
- Coordinates: 42.3376°N 83.0559°W
- Completed: 1926
- Cost: ≈ $1.5 million

Height
- Height: 103.28 ft approximately

Technical details
- Floor count: 7

Design and construction
- Architect: C. Howard Crane

The Film Exchange Building (FEB) is located in Detroit, Michigan, and was designed by C. Howard Crane and built in 1926 for the distribution and booking of movies for the Detroit area. This seven-story building was built near the city's theater district and is located on the northeast corner of the intersection of Cass Avenue and W. Montcalm Street at the edge of the Cass Corridor. It is three blocks west of Comerica Park and less than a block away from the Fisher Freeway (I-75).

== History and construction ==
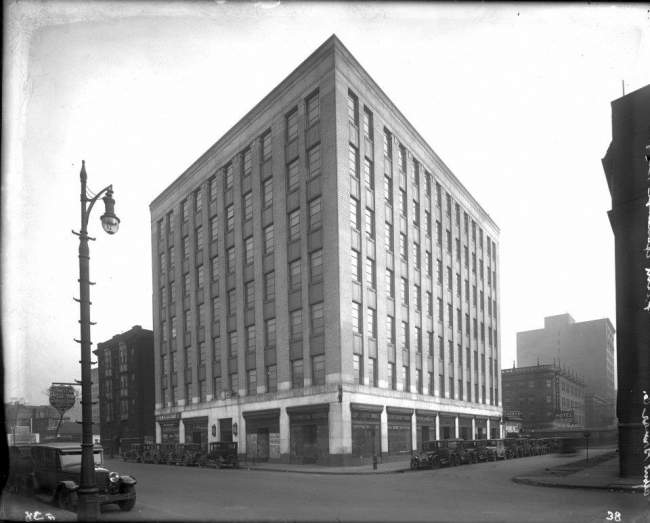
Photograph of the building in its original state.

The city of Detroit was described as a vibrant, culturally diverse and progressive city in its heyday. It was thought of as the birthplace of Motown culture and of the Big Three American auto companies. At over 100 movie houses, Detroit also had a movie theater history from the 1920s through the 1950s. Some of the halls in Detroit rivaled those in New York and Chicago.

In major cities with large numbers of first and second-run theaters like Detroit, the film companies leased office spaces and facilities in buildings called "film exchanges". The film exchange is where exhibitors (theater owners) returned their old films and exchanged them for new releases. The area where the exchanges were located was most often called the "film row".

The Detroit Film Exchange Building, also known as the FEB, is seven stories high and was completed in 1926. It is located on the corner of Cass Avenue and W. Montcalm Street, and it had stores along Cass Avenue and Montcalm Street with offices and lofts above. Some of the tenants included MGM, Warner Brothers, and Universal, each of whom leased whole floors in the building. It was the first building of its kind, and many other cities subsequently built film exchange buildings in a similar fashion.

The Film Exchange Building employed a large office staff that included salespeople, bookkeepers, secretaries, clerks and typists in addition to those in the shipping and receiving departments. Also, because of the fragile nature of film stock (thin reels of celluloid played on a movie projector), there was a large staff of inspectors employed. Before being shipped to another theater, the staff of inspectors diligently inspected the entire reel for any damages consisting of tears, scratches, damaged patches, and ripped sprocket holes. Most often the damages were entirely repaired onsite, with the cost being billed to the theater returning the movie reel. Some film stock was made out of nitrate, which is very flammable, so those employees working with the film operated in fireproof rooms that had self-closing fireproof doors.

The major movie studios released up to 60 feature films annually plus many weekly shorts and news reels. Detroit's Film Exchange Building distributed these to over 600 theaters in its territory of the Lower Peninsula of Michigan. The Milwaukee offices covered the Upper Peninsula of Michigan territory.

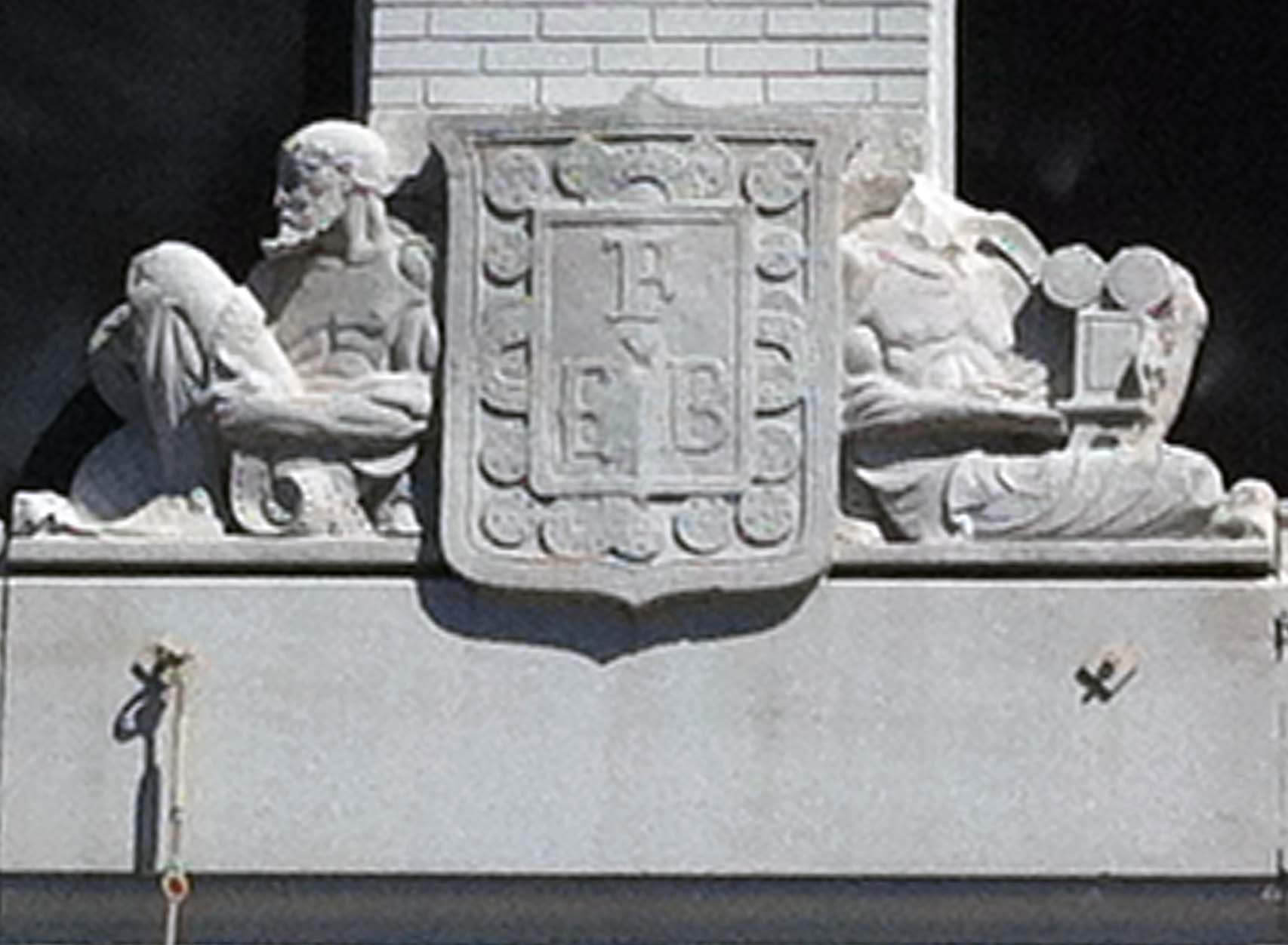
Two figures laced in film; the one on the right holding a film projector. The relief showing "FEB" is also surrounded by film stock.

The Film Exchange Building was revolutionary for its time and because of that many cities built their own film exchange buildings in its style. Many notable movie houses such as The Fox Theatre, The Alger, The Eastown, The National State Theater (The Fillmore), and others only exist because of the Film Exchange Building.

As for the structure of the building, the seven floors contain a system of vents, film vaults, sprinkler system, lobbies with travertine marble and a screening room. It has a frontage of 91 feet on Cass Avenue and 118 feet on Montcalm. On the exterior of the building there is a granite base that is four feet high with the rest of the building covered in Indiana limestone and light-faced brick. Inside the structure are fireproof vaults made for nitrate films, which contain vents that lead to the roof, where they are covered by wooden sheds. The sheds were placed for climate control, since low temperatures prevented the film from reacting.

Due to technological developments, one being safety film, the Film Exchange Building became obsolete in the 1950s. Ending in 1964, the building's main occupants were union members, but after that, the number of tenants began to decline. By the 1970s, the building was closed. Since then, changes have been made to the building. Around 2000, the roof was replaced, and in 2005 the building's broken windows were boarded up and the building securely sealed. Finally, during the summer of 2009 the owners painted the façade bright white.

The structure was built for Mr. and Mrs. Walter R. Stebbins. The architects hired were C. Howard Crane, Elmer George Kiehler and Ben A. Dore associates. The construction contract was awarded to the H. G. Christman Company, now The Christman Company of Lansing, Michigan, and completed on November 15, 1926, costing $1.5 million.

== Gallery ==
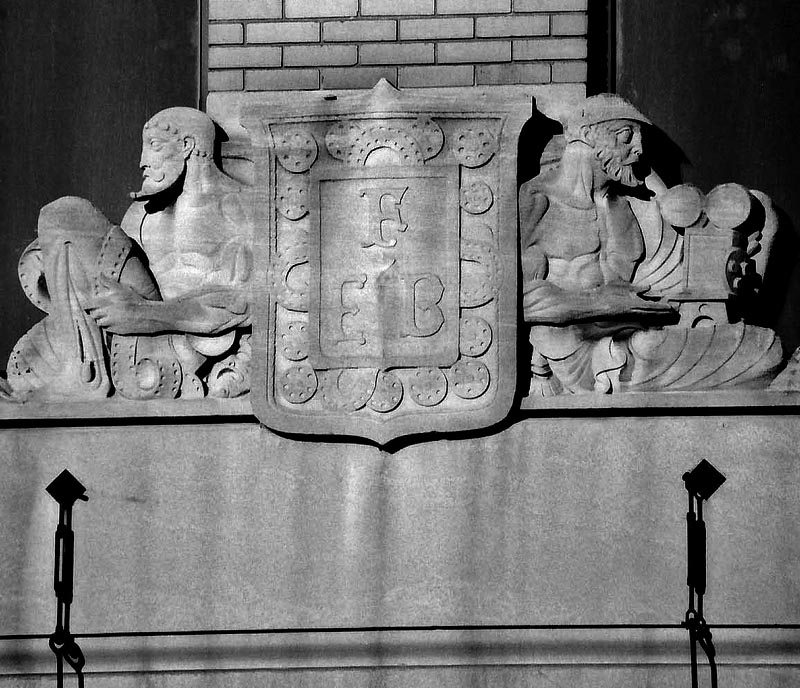
The crest before it was damaged

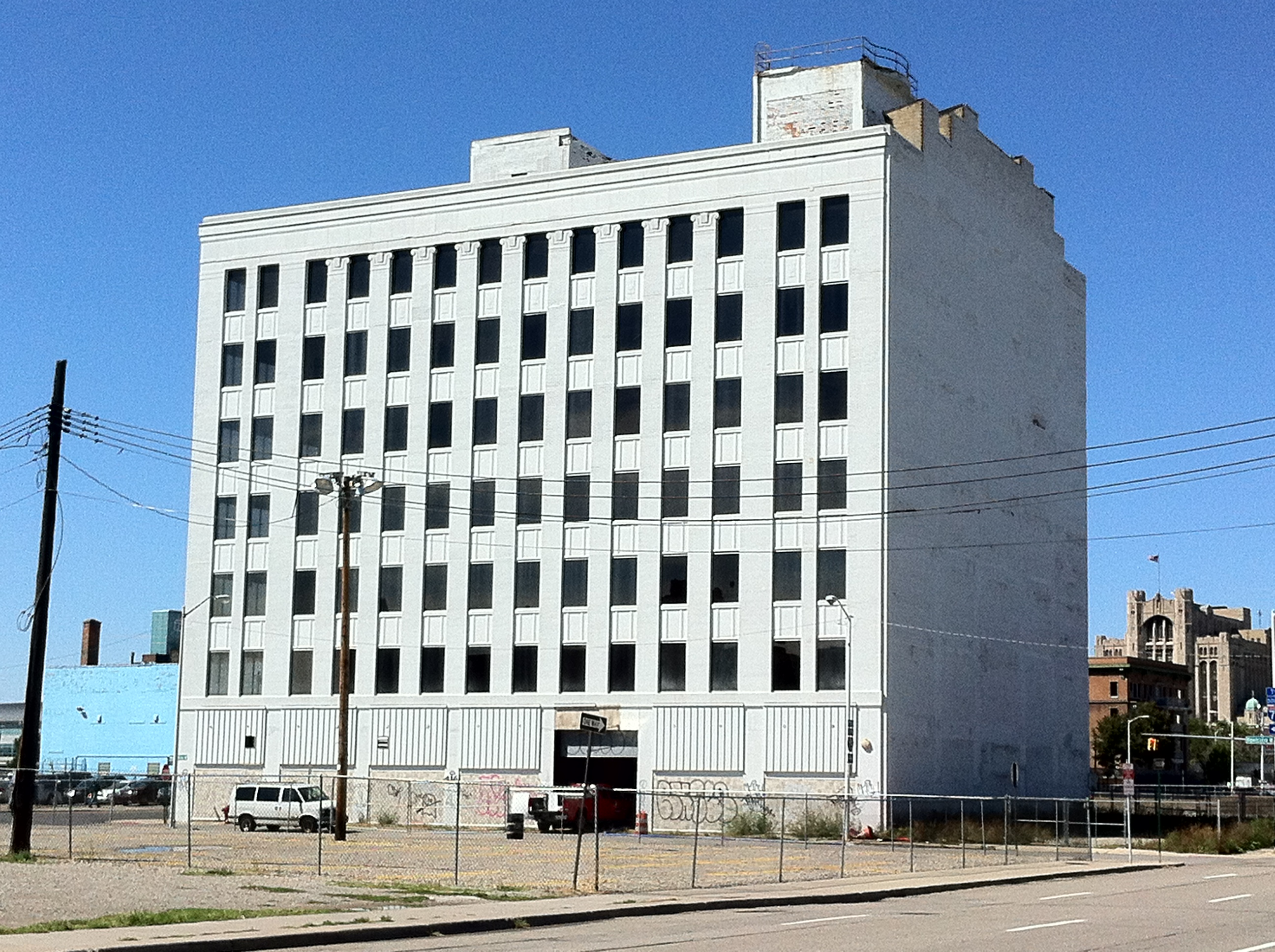
FEB viewed from a block away

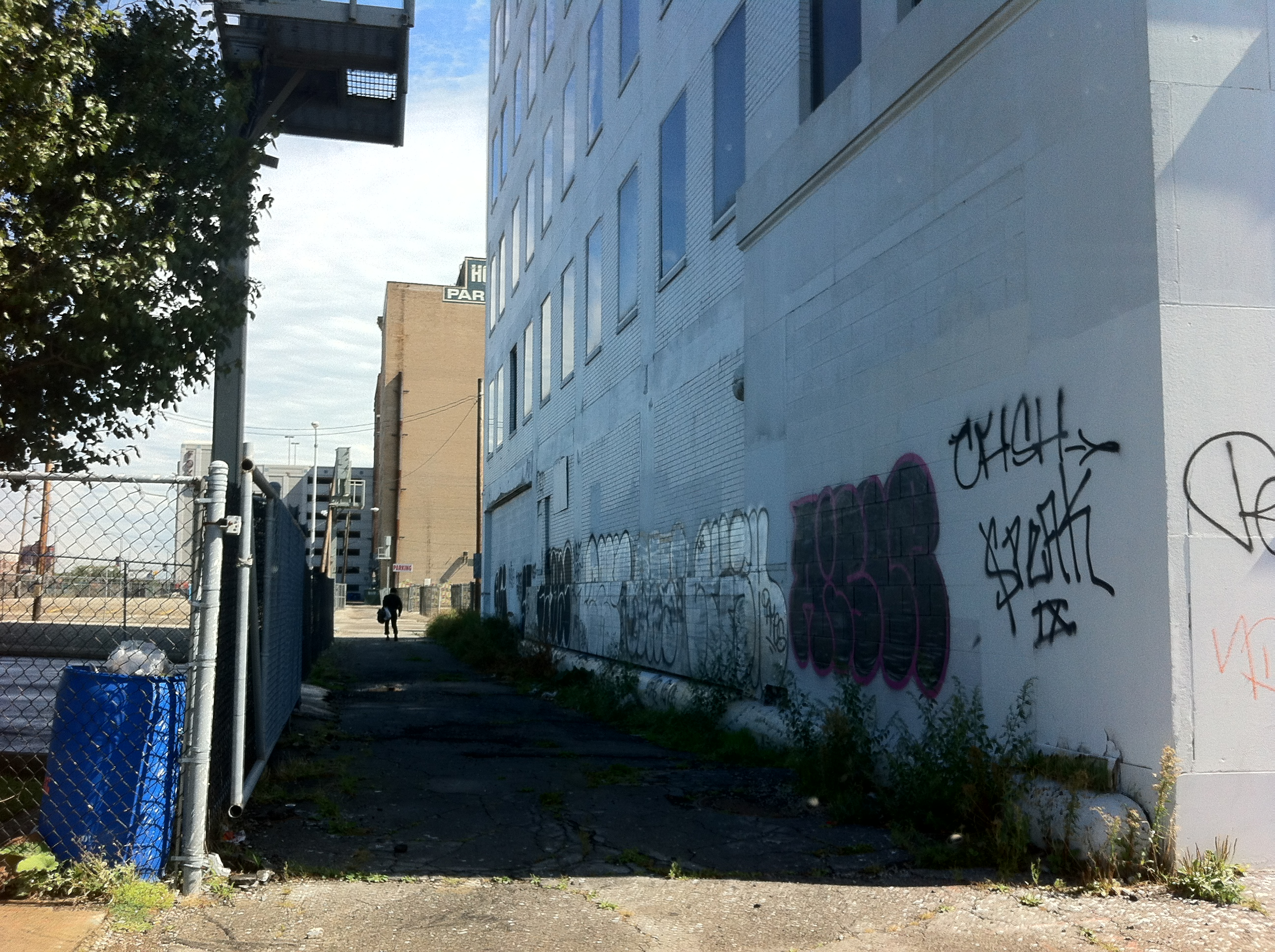
Alley on the side of the building

== See also ==
- Planning and development in Detroit
- Theatre in Detroit
- Paramount Film Exchange (Pittsburgh), another 1920s exchange
- Oklahoma City Film Exchange District, a "film row" from the same era
