= Liberty/Paramount Theatre =

- Liberty Theatre
- U.S. National Register of Historic Places
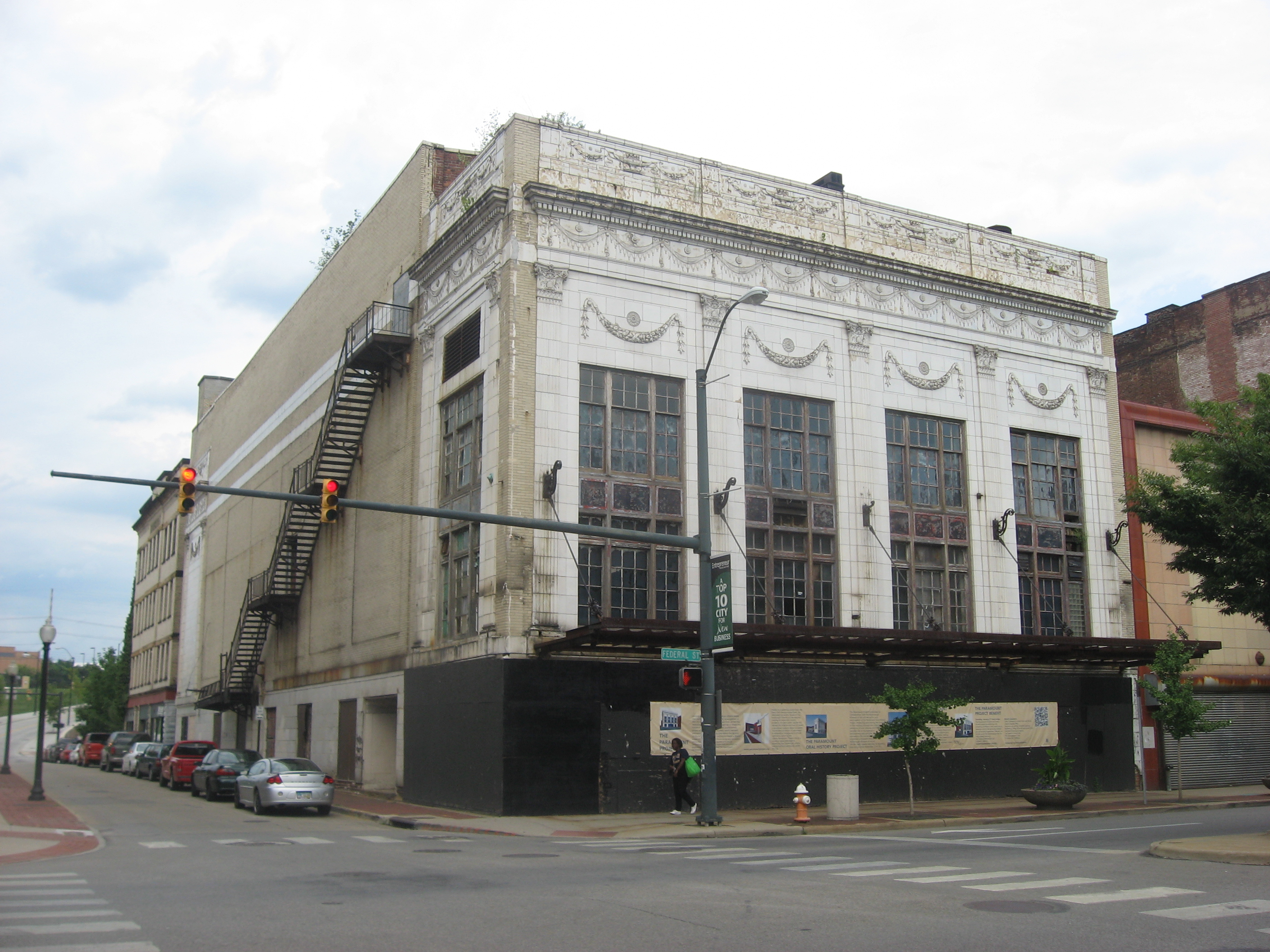
- Theatre in 2012

- Location within Ohio Location within the United States
- Location: 142 Federal Plaza W., Youngstown, Ohio
- Coordinates: 41°6′4″N 80°39′6″W
- Area: less than one acre
- Built: 1917
- Architect: Crane, C. Howard
- Architectural style: Classical Revival
- Demolished: 2013
- NRHP reference No.: 84003776
- Added to NRHP: February 9, 1984

The Liberty/Paramount Theatre was an early movie palace located on West Federal Street and Hazel Avenue in Youngstown, Ohio.

Designed by Detroit architect C. Howard Crane, the theatre opened as the Liberty Theatre on February 11, 1918. The auditorium originally seated 1,700 patrons. The exterior has extensive terra cotta ornamentation, with swags and pilasters. The exterior is an example of the late Neo-classical style popularized by the Ecole des Beaux Arts. The theatre opened as a vaudeville house, and the original operators were C.W. Diebel Associates.

In 1922 the McCrory Group acquired 60% of the stock for $209,000. In 1929 Paramount Pictures Corporation purchased the theatre and renamed it the Paramount Theatre. The company spent $200,000 modernizing the building and installing a sound system so the theatre could present the popular new talkies. In 1933 Paramount Pictures went into receivership, but movies by then became the staple of entertainment for the American public. The theatre survived and prospered until the 1960s when, as with so many American cities during that period, the central area of Youngstown went into a sharp decline.

The final movie screened was a Bill Cosby film, Let's Do it Again, in 1976. The theatre was then closed and the building fell into disrepair. Several attempts were made to revive it, but all failed. The property was listed on the National Register of Historic Places on February 9, 1984, as building #84003776. Ohio One purchased the property 1985 for $26,800. In 1997 Ohio One sold the property on a land contract to Manhattan Theatre Proprietorship. Although the group had the best of intentions, there was no financial plan that could be implemented. On April 21, 2006, Ohio One sold the theatre to Liberty/Paramount Theatre Youngstown, LLC, an investment group led by Grande Venues, Inc. (Mike Novelli, Paul Warshauer and Jon Tharnstrom) of Wheaton, Illinois and USA Parking of Cleveland, (Lou Frangos). The development plan was to restore the theatre on the first floor for theatre and musical events, create a restaurant and cabaret bar in the basement and to create two movie theatres in the balcony. The plan to restore the theatre fell through. It has since been purchased by the city and is slated for demolition.

In July 2011, the city of Youngstown received a $803,490 grant for demolition of the theater. The preservation of the facade would have cost an additional $1 million, with no guarantee of success. So, after years of neglect and unrealized attempts at preservation, demolition of the Liberty Theater began in early July 2013. Preliminary work began July 1, with demolition beginning on July 8. Baumann Enterprises Inc. was hired for the $721,000 demolition project. The site is slated to become a parking lot.
