= C. Howard Crane =

American architect

- Born: Charles Howard Crane; August 13, 1885; Hartford, Connecticut, U.S.
- Died: August 15, 1952 (aged 67); London, England
- Occupation: Architect

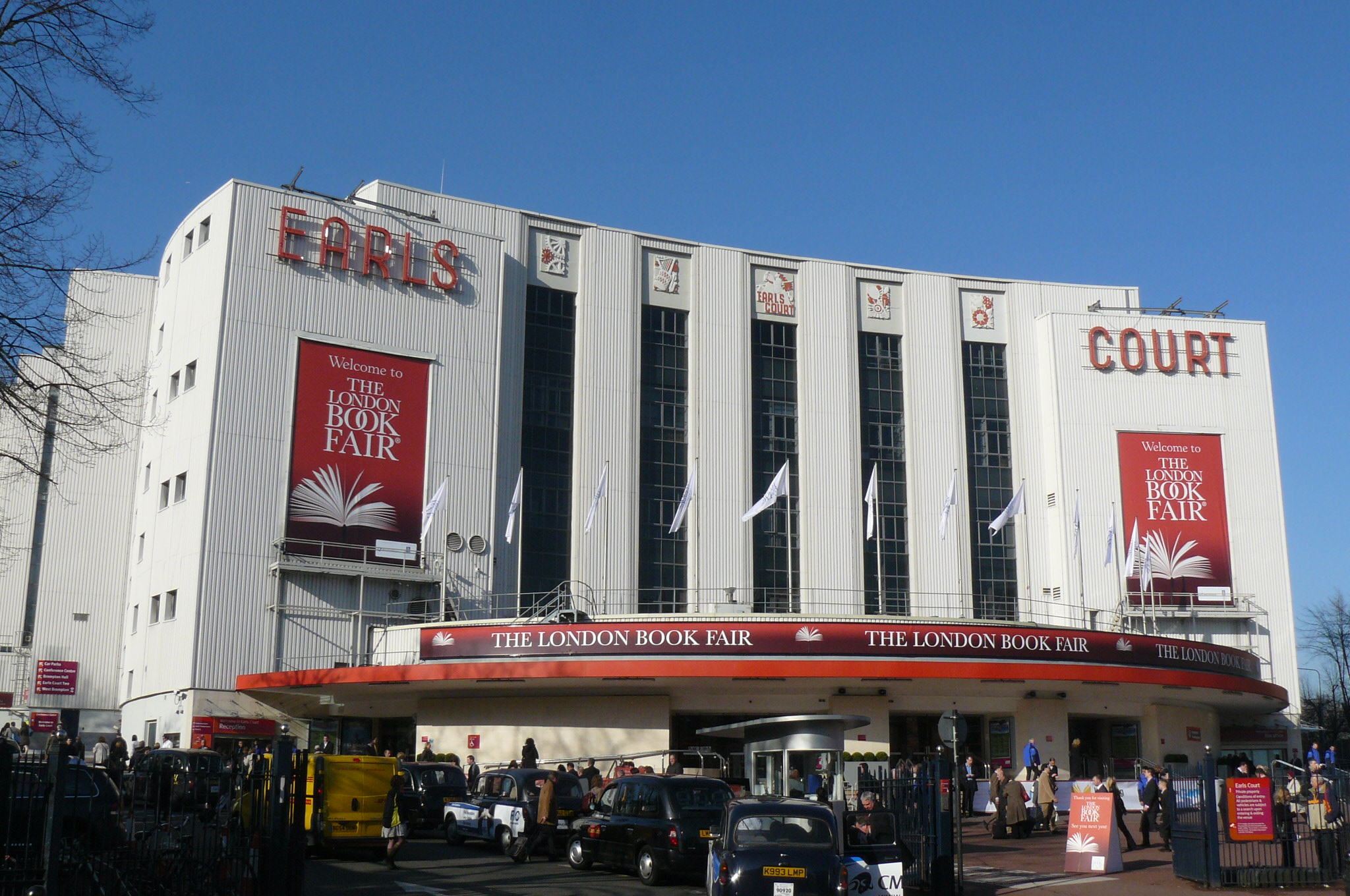
The now demolished iconic Earl's Court Exhibition Centre

Charles Howard Crane (August 13, 1885 – August 14, 1952) was an American architect who was primarily active in Detroit, Michigan. His designs include Detroit's Fox Theatre and Olympia Stadium, as well as LeVeque Tower in Columbus, Ohio, which remains that city's second tallest building.

== Biography ==
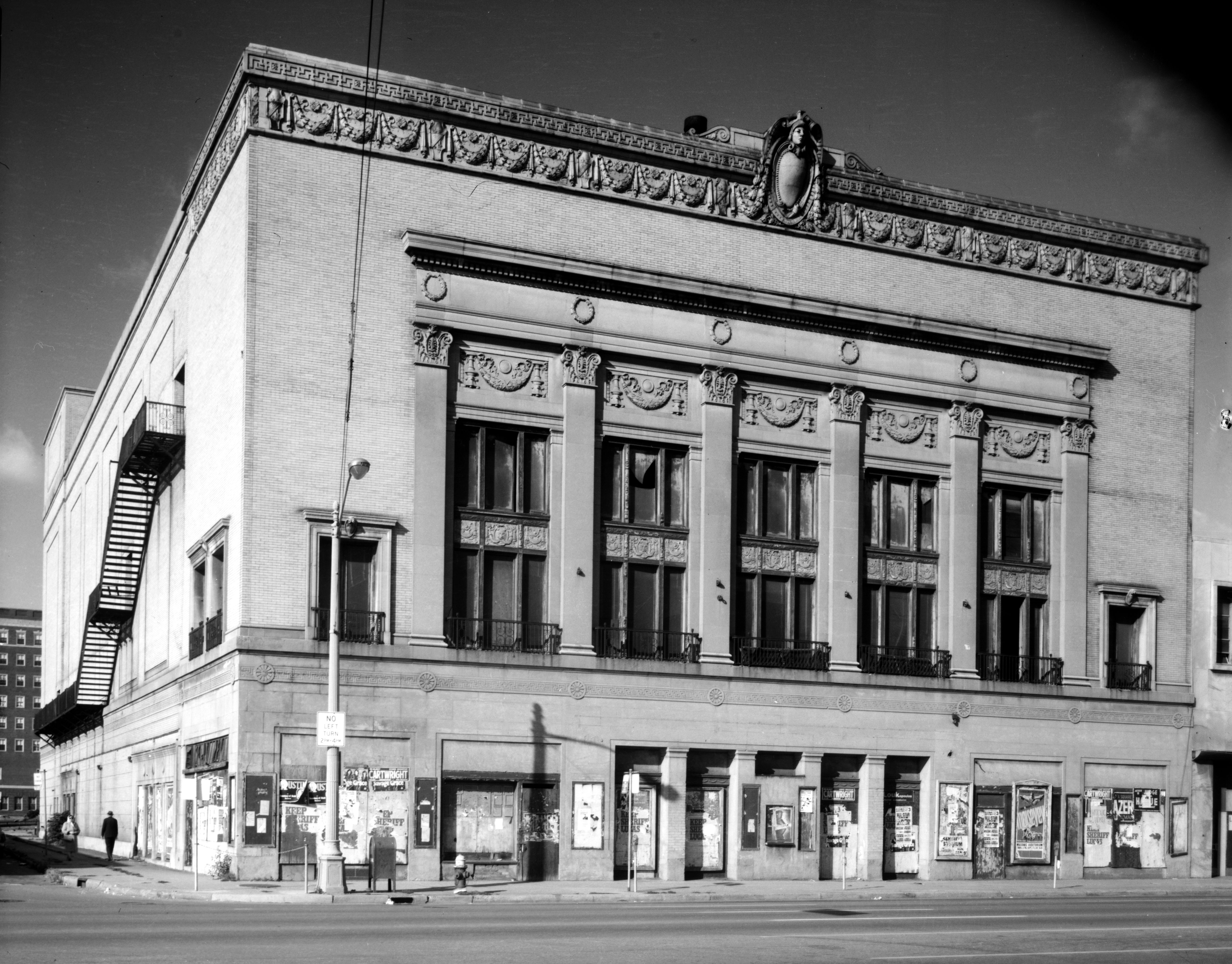
Detroit Orchestra Hall, 1919

Born in Hartford, Connecticut, Crane moved to Detroit in 1904. He worked as a draftsman for several architectural firms, including Albert Kahn Associates, Smith, Hinchman & Grylls, and the office of Gustave A. Mueller, before opening his own office in 1908.

Like Thomas W. Lamb and John Eberson, Crane specialized in the design of movie palaces in North America. Crane's career would include some 250 theaters in total, with 62 of them in the Detroit area. His 5174-seat Detroit Fox Theatre was the largest of the Fox Theatres. The 4,500 seat Fox Theatre in St. Louis was its slightly smaller architectural near twin. These were considered to have been his architectural masterpieces. Among the five massive Fox theatres, Crane also designed the Brooklyn Fox (4,088 seats, razed).

Crane also designed Olympia Stadium (Detroit Olympia), which eventually had seating for 13,375 plus standing room for 3,300. Olympia, used by the Detroit Red Wings, was razed in 1987.

Crane also designed many office buildings. Most of his many downtown Detroit movie palaces had attached office towers that he designed (the Fox, United Artists, State, Capitol). However, Crane's office tower masterpiece is the 47 story 555 ft. tall LeVeque Tower in Columbus, Ohio.

Due to the 1929 Great Depression, Crane's theatre and office building commissions dried up. He became disillusioned and in 1930 moved to London, England, although he kept his Detroit office open for many years after moving. Crane designed many cinemas across Britain, but in much tamer designs than his American movie palaces.

Crane's most famous U.K. commission was Earls Court Exhibition Centre, an Art Moderne convention center that opened in 1937. It closed in 2014 and was demolished between 2015 and 2017.

Crane returned to visit Detroit once or twice a year until World War II. He then remained in London, where he died and was buried in 1952. His namesake descendants (C. Howard Crane III, et al.) now live in the Detroit area.

== Crane-designed buildings ==
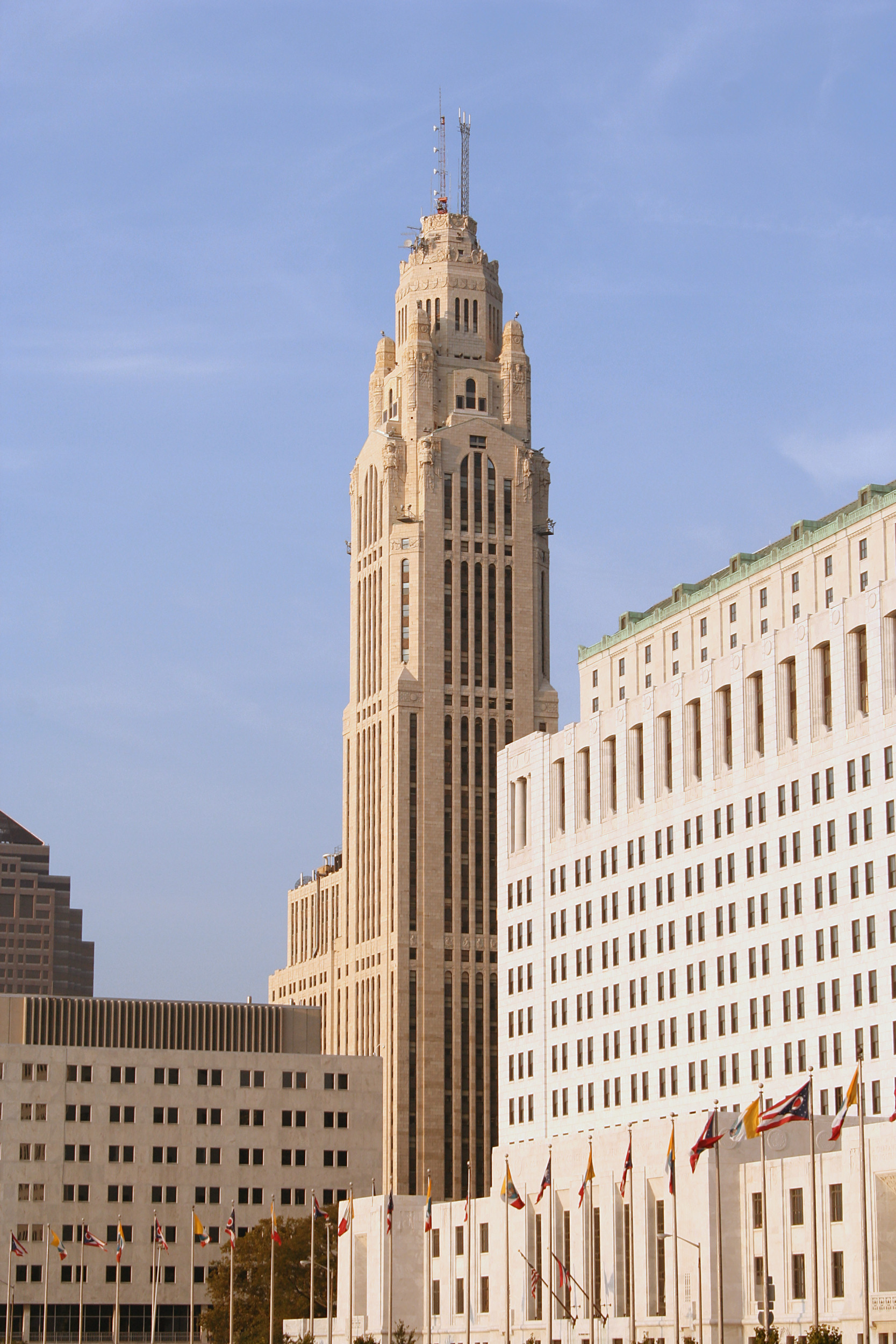
LeVeque Tower, 1927

=== United States ===
==== Detroit ====
- Majestic Theatre, 1915
- Orchestra Hall, 1919
- Detroit Opera House, 1922
- Temple Beth-El conversion to theatre, 1922
- Detroit Institute of Arts (consulting architect), 1923–27
- Lafayette Building, 1923, razed 2010
- The Fillmore Detroit, 1925
- Film Exchange Building, 1926
- Detroit Olympia, 1927, razed 1987
- United Artists Theatre Building, 1928
- Fox Theatre, 1928

==== Elsewhere ====
- Liberty/Paramount Theatre, Youngstown, Ohio, 1918
- Macomb Music Theatre, Mount Clemens, Michigan, 1921
- Virginia Theatre, Champaign, Illinois, 1921
- World Theater, Omaha, Nebraska, 1922, razed 1980
- Warner Theatre, Washington D.C., 1924
- August Wilson Theatre, New York City, New York, 1925
- United Artists Theater, Los Angeles, California, 1927
- LeVeque Tower, Columbus, Ohio, 1927
- Fox Theatre, St. Louis, Missouri, 1929
- State Theatre, Ann Arbor, Michigan, 1942

=== Canada ===
- The Metropolitan, Winnipeg, Manitoba, 1919
- Old Walkerville Theatre, Walkerville, Ontario, 1920
- Palace Theatre, Calgary, Alberta, 1921

=== England ===
- Earls Court Exhibition Centre, London, 1937, demolished 2014
- Odeon Cinema, Holloway, London, 1938
- Vickers-Armstrongs headquarters, Brooklands, Weybridge, 1938

== See also ==
- Architecture of metropolitan Detroit
- Performing arts in Detroit
