= Holloway, London =

Area in London, England

Coordinates: 51.5570°N 0.1173°W

Holloway
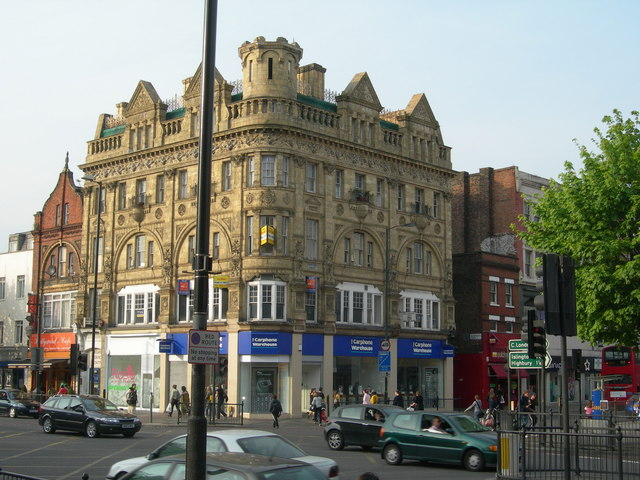
- Junction of Holloway Road and Seven Sisters Road in central Holloway

- Location within Greater London
- OS grid reference: TQ306859
  - Charing Cross: 3.3 mi (5.3 km) S
- London borough: Islington
- Ceremonial county: Greater London
- Region: London
- Country: England
- Sovereign state: United Kingdom
- Post town: LONDON
- Postcode district: N7, N19
- Dialling code: 020
- Police: Metropolitan
- Fire: London
- Ambulance: London
- UK Parliament: Islington South and Finsbury; Islington North
- London Assembly: North East

Holloway is an area of north London in the borough of Islington, 3.3 miles (5.3 km) north of Charing Cross, which follows the line of the Holloway Road (A1). At the centre of Holloway is the Nag's Head commercial area which sits between the more residential Upper Holloway and Lower Holloway neighbourhoods. Holloway has a multicultural population and includes the Emirates Stadium, home of Arsenal F.C. Until 2016, it was the site of Holloway Prison, the largest women's prison in Europe. Before 1965, it was in the historic county of Middlesex.

== History ==
The origins of the name are disputed; some believe that it derives from Hollow, or Hollow way, due to a dip in the road caused by the passage of animals and water erosion, as this was the main cattle driving route from the North into Smithfield. In Lower Holloway the former Back Road, now Liverpool Road was used to rest and graze the cattle before entering London. Others believe the name derives from Hallow and refers to the road's historic significance as part of the pilgrimage route to Walsingham.

No documentary evidence can be found to support either derivation; and by 1307, the name Holwey was applied to the district around the road. The main stretch of Holloway Road runs through the site of the former villages of Tollington and Stroud. The exact time of their founding is not known, but the earliest record of them is in the Domesday Book. The names had ceased being used by the late 17th century, but are still preserved in the local place names of Tollington Park and Stroud Green.

The original route from London went through Tollington Lane. By the 14th century it was in such poor condition that the Bishop of London built a new road up Highgate Hill and was claiming tolls by 1318. This was the origin of the Great North Road, now the A1, which passes through Holloway.

Until the 18th century, the area was predominantly rural, but as London expanded in the second half of the 19th century it became urbanised. Holloway, like much of inner north London, experienced further rapid growth in the early 1900s. It became an important local shopping centre, benefitting from the road junction at Nag's Head which became an important hub for trolleybuses till their withdrawal in the 1950s. The London and North Eastern Railway opened a station here, which had a significant impact on the residential and commercial development of the neighbourhood in the latter part of the 19th century. The station, now closed, was at the same spot as the current Holloway Road tube station, on the Piccadilly line.

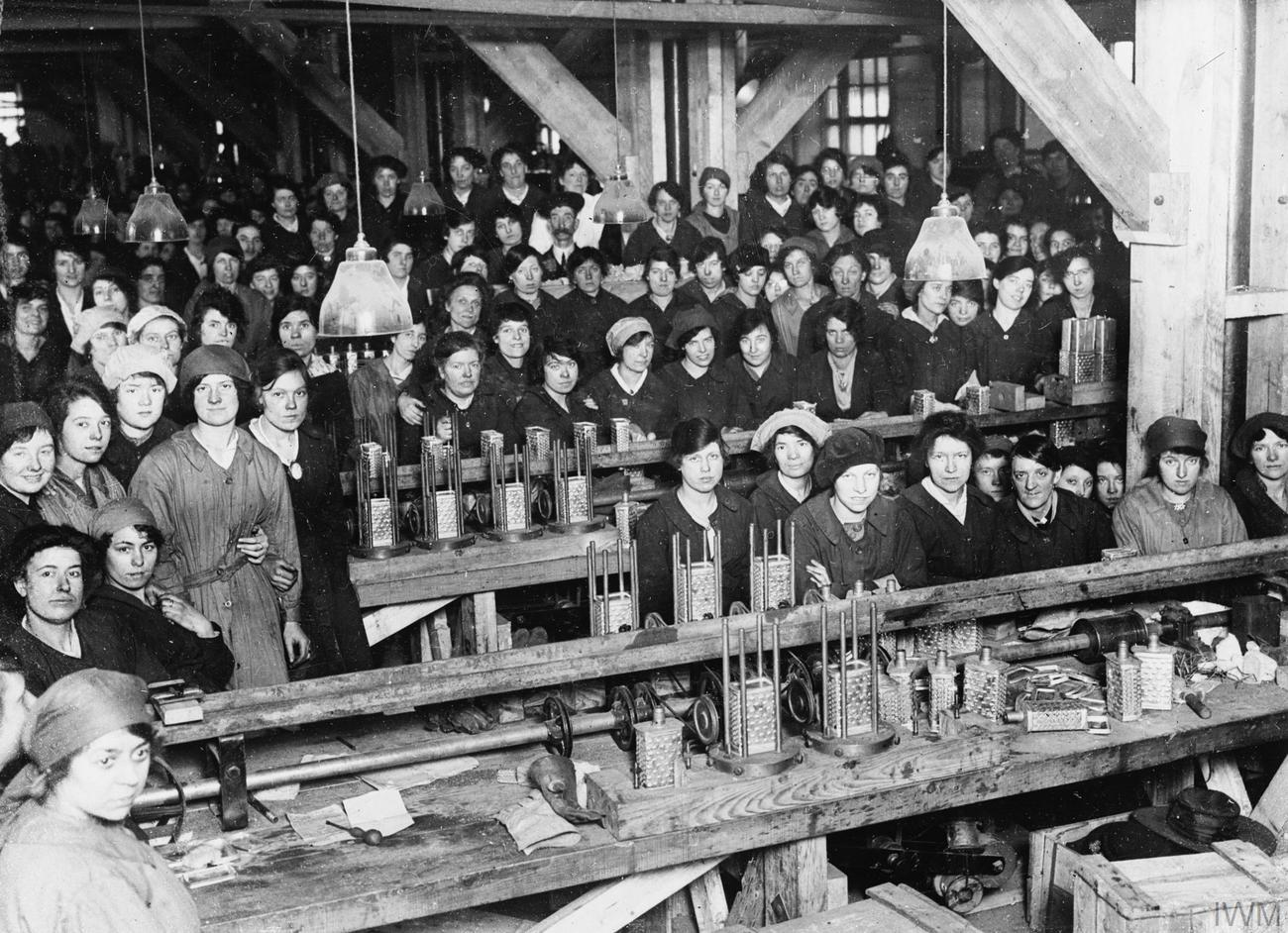
Female workers in a gas mask factory, Holloway, London, 1918

In 1921, the first sexual health clinic for women in the whole of the UK was opened in Holloway by Marie Stopes. The Mothers' Clinic at 61 Marlborough Road, Holloway, North London, opened on 17 March 1921. The clinic was run by midwives and supported by visiting doctors. It offered mothers birth control advice, taught them birth control methods and dispensed Stopes own "Pro-Race" brand cervical cap. The free clinic was open to all married women for knowledge about reproductive health. Stopes opposed abortion; she tried to discover alternatives for families and increase knowledge about birth control and the reproductive system.

In the late 1930s, the Odeon cinema on the junction of Tufnell Park Road and Holloway Road was built as a Gaumont but was severely damaged by a doodlebug during the Second World War. It has recently undergone extensive refurbishment but retains its foyer and staircase. It is Grade II listed.

During the Second World War, parts of Holloway experienced intense bombing due to its proximity to King's Cross railway station.

Holloway was also home to HMP Holloway in Parkhurst Road, which was first built in 1852, originally housing both male and female prisoners, and from 1902 until its closure in 2016 housed only women and was the UK's major female prison. Prisoners that had been held at the original prison include Ruth Ellis, Isabella Glyn, Christabel Pankhurst and Oscar Wilde. The site is due to be redeveloped, though as of 2017 the prison buildings still stand.

== Holloway as of 2021 ==
Audio description of "Paradise park" in Holloway by Bobby Baker

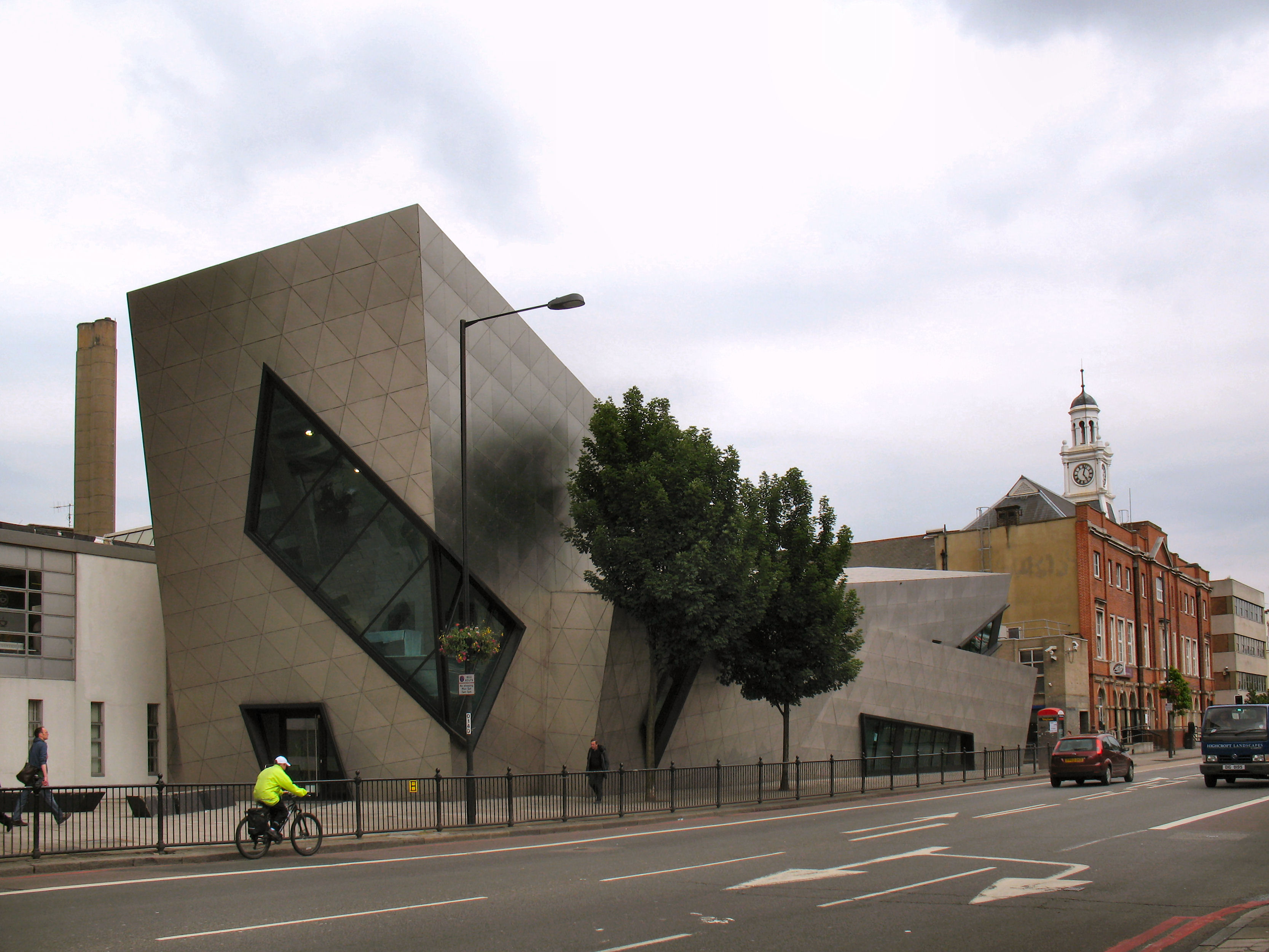
Daniel Libeskind's Orion Building, London Metropolitan University on Holloway Road

Like many other parts of Islington, the gentrification of Holloway is now under way, particularly in the Hillmarton and Mercers Road/Tavistock Terrace conservation areas (to the south and west of Holloway Road). There are also many luxury development projects taking place over a large area between the Arsenal stadium development and Caledonian Road. In addition, Islington London Borough Council have earmarked many improvement projects for the Nag's Head area over the next decade. It is also home to the large, sprawling Andover housing estate.

Near to Holloway Road tube station is the North Campus of London Metropolitan University. This includes the Tower building, Stapleton House and the Learning Centre. Another prominent feature in Holloway is the Emirates Stadium, home of Arsenal F.C.

The area is home to many artists and people who work in the media, including many journalists, writers and professionals working in film and television. It is also known as a hotspot for many of London's graffiti artists.

== Demographics ==
At the 2001 census, the population of Holloway was 41,329, of those 48% male and 52% female. It is home to a very multicultural population, with the Holloway ward in 2011 recorded as: 42% white British, 21% from other white backgrounds, 7% mixed race, 14% Black, and 11% Asian. The mixed race population is in the top 100 out of 8,500 wards in the country. It is one of the most densely populated areas of London, with a density of approximately 40,000 people per square mile.

== Notable residents ==
- Jimmi Harkishin (born 1965), actor known for playing Dev Alahan in Coronation Street, lived and grew up on Tollington Road in Holloway.
- Edward Lear (1812 – 1888), artist, illustrator, writer and poet; born and brought up in Holloway.
- Joe Meek (1929 – 1967), record producer, sound engineer, songwriter, and audio inventor; lived, worked and died at 304 Holloway Road N7.
- Steve Howe (born 1947), guitarist with Yes and Asia; born and lived in Loraine Mansions, Widdenham Road, through his teen years.
- David Littlewood (born 1955), cricketer.
- John Lydon (born 1956; AKA Johnny Rotten), singer and musician with Sex Pistols and Public Image Ltd, grew up in Benwell Road.
- Kaya Scodelario (born 1992), actress.
- Douglas Adams (1952 – 2001), author; wrote The Hitchhiker's Guide to the Galaxy at 19 Kingsdown Road.
- Tony Alexander King (born 1967), serial rapist and murderer known as "The Holloway Strangler".
- Christian Wolmar (born 1949), author, railway historian and politician.

== Ashburton Grove ==
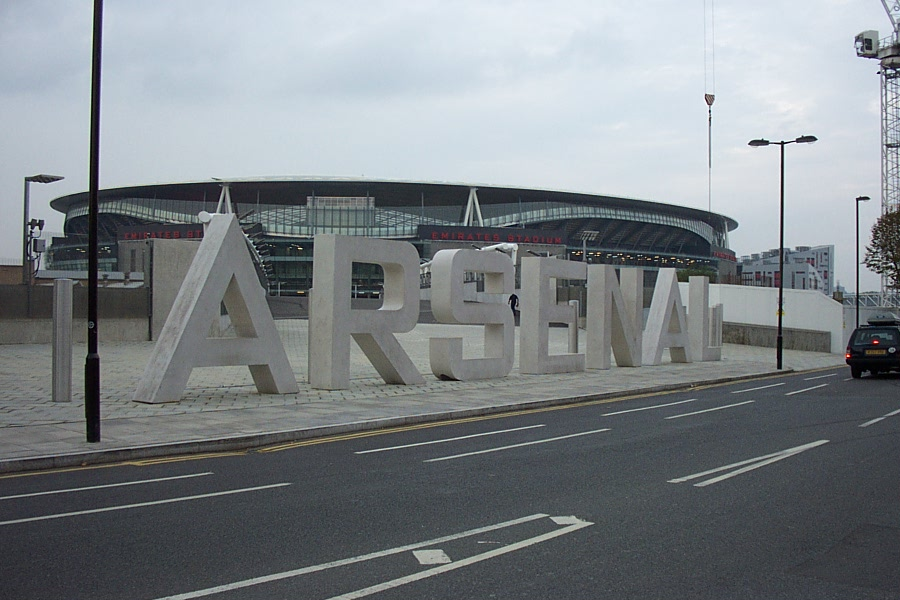
Arsenal's statue lettering at the Emirates Stadium

Arsenal Football Club moved after 93 years at Highbury to a new stadium at Ashburton Grove in Holloway. It was informally known as Ashburton Grove until a naming rights deal with Emirates was announced. The stadium opened in the summer of 2006, and has an all-seated capacity of 60,355, making it the third biggest stadium in the Premiership after Old Trafford and the Tottenham Hotspur Stadium and the fourth biggest in London after Wembley Stadium, Twickenham Stadium and the Tottenham Hotspur Stadium. The overall cost of the project was £390 million.

Ashburton Grove was the site of Islington's Waste Transfer station. This facility has been moved to nearby Hornsey Street. All of Islington's waste is shipped here for onward processing - together with a significant proportion of that generated by the neighbouring London Boroughs of Camden and Hackney. The waste is transported by road to the Edmonton Solid Waste Incineration Plant or to landfill sites in Cambridgeshire and Bedfordshire.

== Transport ==
The nearest London Underground stations are Caledonian Road, Highbury & Islington, Holloway Road and Archway.

The nearest London Overground stations are Caledonian Road & Barnsbury, Camden Road, Highbury & Islington and Upper Holloway.

Drayton Park railway station is near the southern end of Holloway Road, and is on the Northern City Line.

Holloway is served by the following bus routes: 4, 17, 21, 29, 43 (24-hour), 91, 153, 253, 254, 259, 263, 310 and 393 and night routes N29, N41, N91, N253 and N279.

== See also ==
- St Mary Magdalene Church, Holloway Road
