= Fox Theatre (St. Louis) =

Theater in St. Louis, Missouri, United States

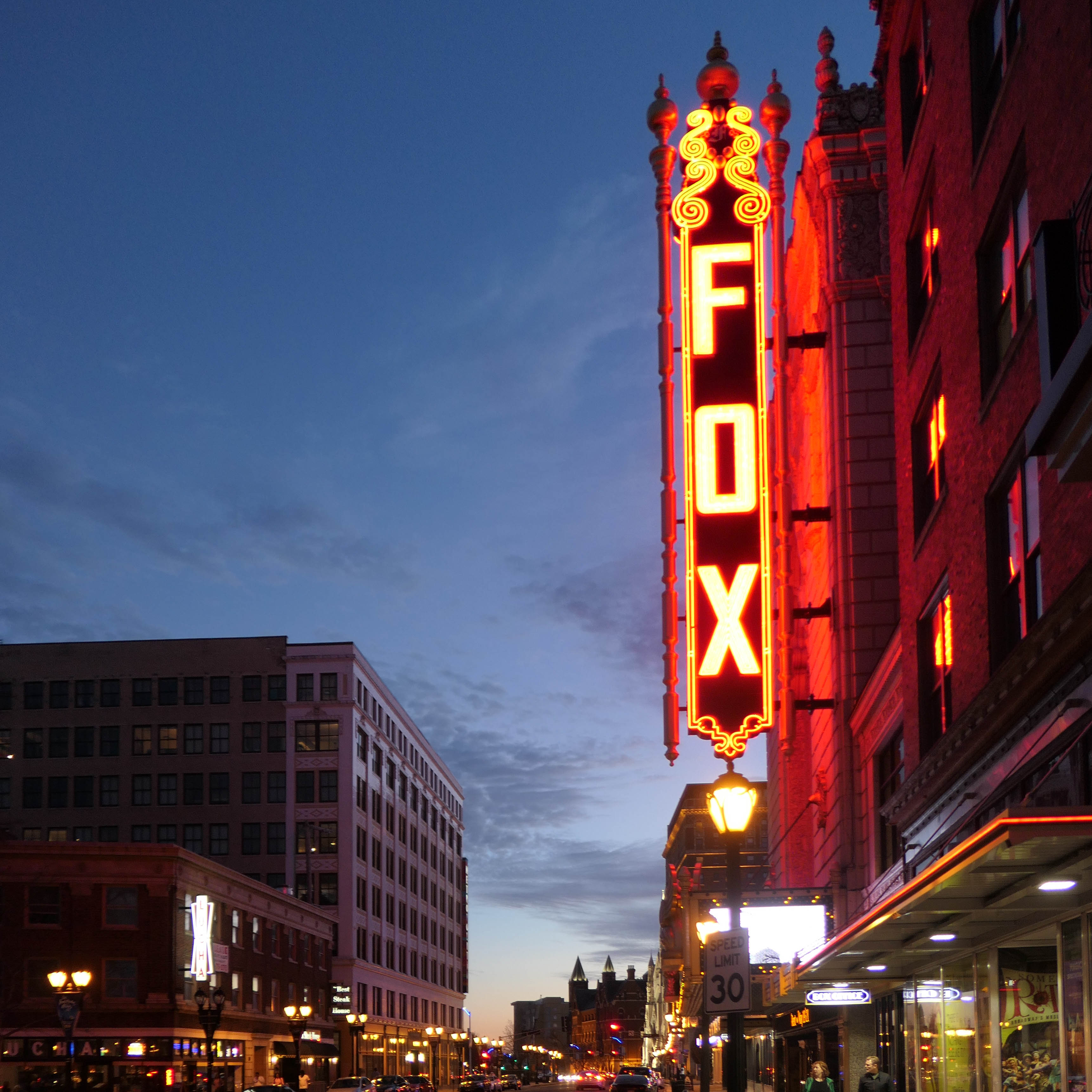
- The Fox Theatre, St Louis
- Interactive map of Fox Theatre (St. Louis)
- Location: 527 N. Grand Blvd. St. Louis, Missouri, United States
- Coordinates: 38°38′19″N 90°13′54″W
- Owner: Fox Associates
- Capacity: 4,500
- Type: Concert venue
- Public transit: MetroBus

Construction
- Opened: 1929
- Renovated: 1982

Website
- fabulousfox.com
- Fox Theater
- U.S. National Register of Historic Places
- St. Louis Landmark
- Location within St. Louis Location within Missouri Location within the United States
- Architect: C. Howard Crane
- Architectural style: Siamese Byzantine style
- NRHP reference No.: 76002261
- Added to NRHP: October 8, 1976

The Fox Theatre, a former movie palace, is a performing arts center located at 527 N. Grand Blvd. in St. Louis, Missouri, United States. Also known as "The Fabulous Fox", it is situated in the arts district of the Grand Center area in Midtown St. Louis, one block north of Saint Louis University. It opened in 1929 and was completely restored in 1982.

== History ==
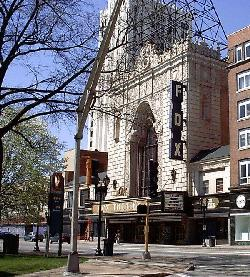
Fox Theatre during the day

The Fox was built in 1929 by movie pioneer William Fox as a showcase for the films of the Fox Film Corporation and elaborate stage shows. It was one of a group of five spectacular Fox Theatres built by Fox in the late 1920s. (The others were the Fox Theatres in Brooklyn, Atlanta, Detroit, and San Francisco.)

When the theater opened on January 31, 1929, it was reportedly the second-largest theater in the United States, with 5,060 seats. It was one of St. Louis's leading movie theaters through the 1960s and has survived to become a versatile performing arts venue.

The Fox was designed by an architect specializing in theaters, C. Howard Crane, in an eclectic blend of Asian decorative motifs sometimes called Siamese Byzantine. The interior is the architectural twin of another Fox Theatre built in Detroit in 1928. Reporters in 1929 described the Fox Theatres in St. Louis and Detroit as "awe-inspiringly fashioned after Hindoo (sic) Mosques of Old India, bewildering in their richness and dazzling in their appointments ... striking a note that reverberates around the architectural and theatrical worlds." William Fox nicknamed the style the "Eve Leo Style" in tribute to his wife, who decorated the interior with furnishings, paintings and sculpture she had bought on her trips overseas.

The Fox Theatre closed in March 1978 and was purchased by Fox Associates in 1981. The theater was restored at a price of at least $3 million and in comparison, the Fox cost $6 million to build in 1929. It reopened in September 1982 with the Broadway musical Barnum. Fox Theatricals is also the operator of the Briar Street Theater in Chicago.

The Fox seats 4,192 theatergoers plus 234 in the private Fox Club.

In September 2007, the venue celebrated the 25th anniversary of its re-opening with a concert featuring Brian Stokes Mitchell and Linda Eder and a day of the theater showing movies in a throwback to its beginnings.

== Notable events ==
The façade of the Fox briefly appears in the 1981 John Carpenter film Escape from New York as an abandoned Broadway theatre.

The Theatre hosted a 60th birthday concert for St. Louis–born, early rock and roll pioneer, Chuck Berry in 1986. Keith Richards, of The Rolling Stones, was the project's musical director and backing band leader. Taylor Hackford incorporated the concert into a documentary film about Berry and released the film as Hail! Hail! Rock 'n' Roll, as a feature. In the film, Berry mentions that, as a child growing up in St. Louis, he was denied entrance to the Fox to watch a film because he was black.

The Fox was the final stop of the Third National Tour of Les Misérables, with the final show taking place on July 23, 2006. The tour ran for 17 years, totaling 7,061 performances.

The NBC show America's Got Talent came to the Fox Theatre March 8 to March 10, 2012 to film five tapings.

== Theater organ ==
The theater's Wurlitzer pipe organ cost $75,000 in 1929. It has four manuals, 36 ranks and 348 stops. Restoration of the organ was undertaken by Marlin Mackley in 1981.

Tom Terry was the theater's resident organist from 1929 to 1935. The organ was not played for the public from 1935 to 1952. In 1952, Stan Kann was named resident organist. He served as organist at the Fox for 22 years and became something of a legend to theater organ aficionados.

A second Wurlitzer organ was installed in the lobby during the theater's renovation in the 1980s. It replaced the original Möller organ which had been removed. The smaller lobby organ has two manuals and 11 ranks and had been originally installed in the Majestic Theatre in East St. Louis, Illinois, in 1930.

Interior of Fox Theatre - May 2024
