= Odeon Cinema, Holloway =

Cinema in Islington, London, England

Odeon Cinema
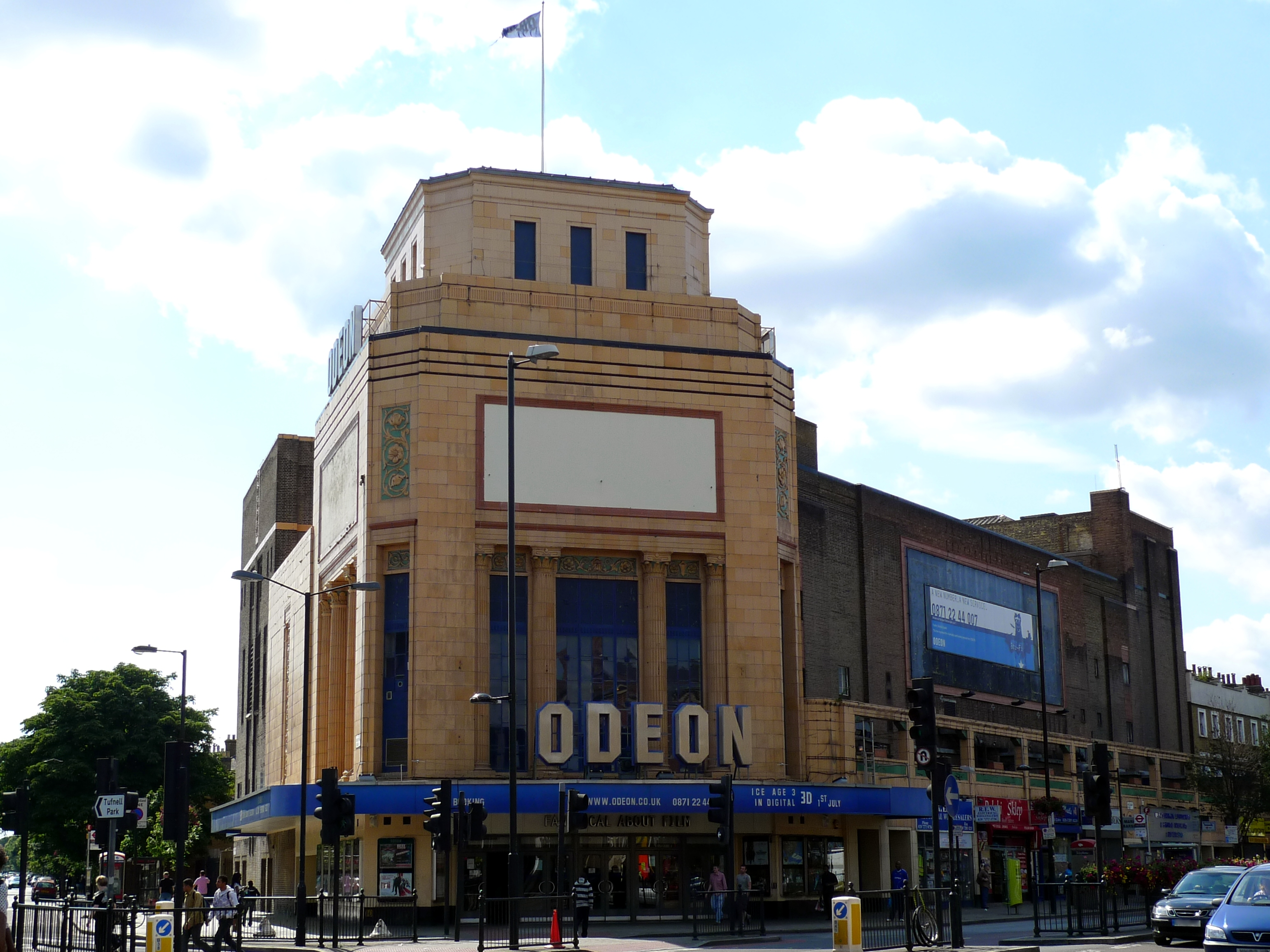

General information
- Location: Holloway, London
- Address: 419-427 Holloway Road; Holloway N7 6LJ
- Country: United Kingdom
- Coordinates: 51°33′30.97″N 0°07′17.27″W grid reference TQ 30322 86085
- Opened: 1938

Design and construction
- Architect(s): C. Howard Crane

Website
- www.odeon.co.uk/cinemas/holloway/

The Odeon Cinema, originally the Gaumont, is a multiplex cinema in Holloway, London, England. It was built in 1938, and designed by the American architect C. Howard Crane. It is a Grade II listed building: the listing text states that "its external impact is still greater than almost any other cinema, an example of trans-Atlantic bravura."

== History and description ==
The cinema is situated at the corner of Tufnell Park Road and Holloway Road.

It was designed by C. Howard Crane, an American architect resident in London in the 1930s. It was a project of Hyams and Gale, who also built Gaumont State Cinema in Kilburn, London, and is similarly large, originally seating 3,006 in one auditorium. Hyams and Gale was acquired by Gaumont-British before the cinema opened. There was a restaurant, seating 220, above the entrance; theatre facilities included an orchestra pit, dressing rooms and rehearsal rooms. The first film shown, on 5 September 1938, was The Hurricane.

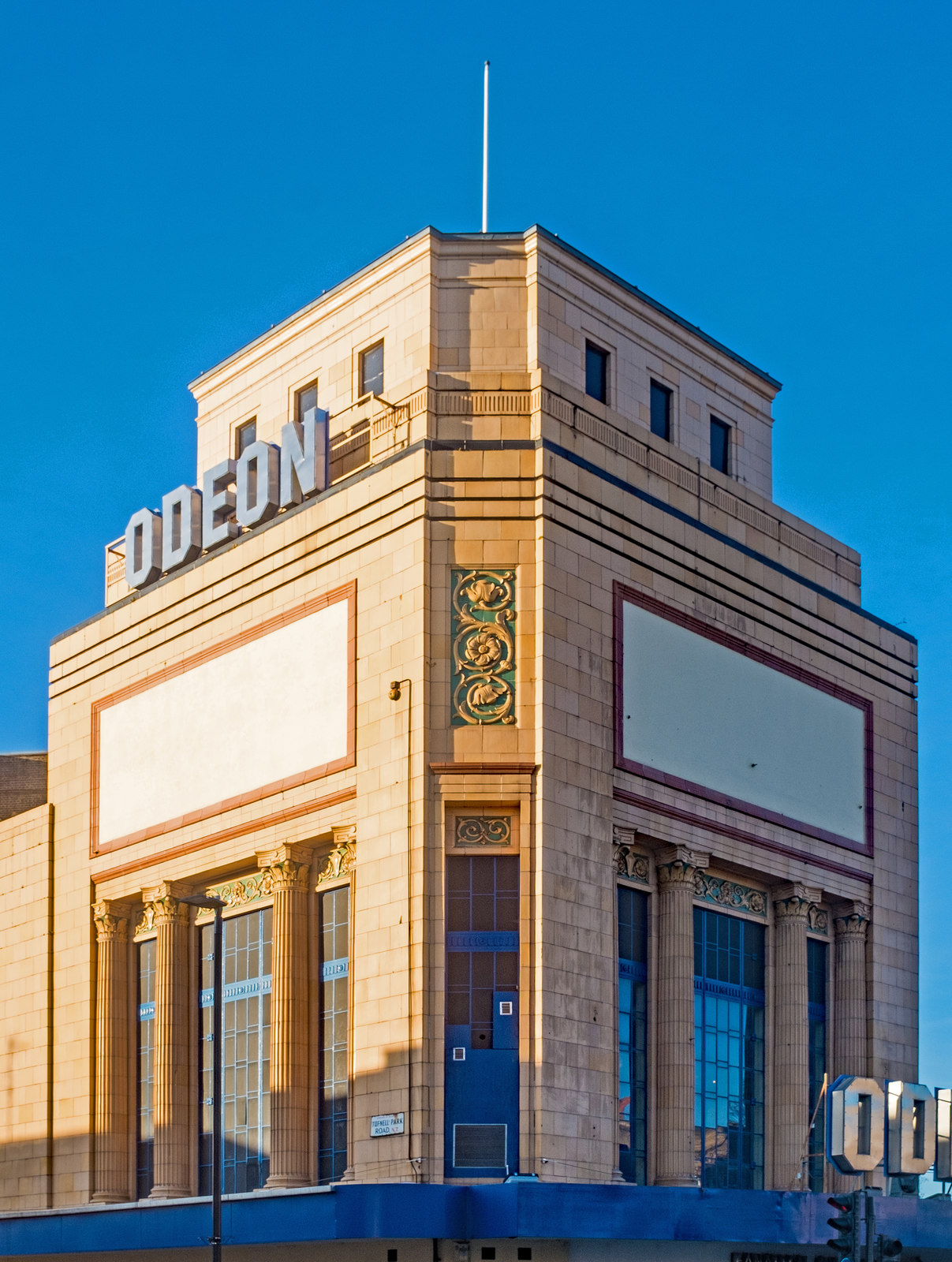
The tower of the Odeon, Holloway

The building was damaged on 8 November 1944 by a V-1 flying bomb; the external walls and foyers survived, but the interior was destroyed. After reconstruction, the cinema re-opened on 21 July 1958, showing the film Run Silent, Run Deep.

The building, on a wedge-shaped site, has at the corner a rectangular tower, faced with faience. Above the entrance, the tower has windows with engaged columns, and friezes with a scroll design. There is a lower wing to the tower, also faced with faience, to the left on Tufnell Park Road. To the right there is the auditorium block, of brick, with a parade of shops below.

The cinema was renamed the Odeon in 1962; in 1973 three screens were installed, and later there were eight screens. From 2019, when it was converted to an Odeon Luxe Cinema, there are seven screens.
