= Paramount Film Exchange (Pittsburgh) =

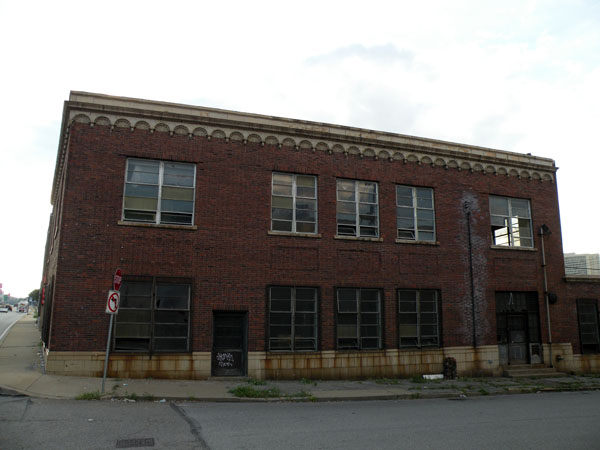

- Location within Pittsburgh
- 40.435889°N 79.981722°W
- Location: 1727 Boulevard of the Allies in the Bluff neighborhood of Pittsburgh, Pennsylvania, USA

History
- Built: 1926

Site notes
- Architect: R. E. Hall Co.

The Paramount Film Exchange is a historic film exchange building at 1727 Boulevard of the Allies in the Uptown or Bluff neighborhood of Pittsburgh, Pennsylvania, designed in 1926 by R. E. Hall Co. architects from New York City. In 2010, the building was bought by arts-oriented local entrepreneurs who founded the Paramount Film Exchange (PFEX), Inc., to redevelop the then-abandoned building in a historically sensitive manner.

In the words of film historian Max Alvarez, film exchanges were "agencies engaging in the practice of renting or trading motion pictures", which, in the early part of the 20th century, served as "full-service stores for theater owner/managers." Motion-picture studios owned exchanges and used them to screen their films for potential exhibitors in a local market. Once videocassettes came into use in the 1970s, it was no longer necessary to screen a film in a screening room, and film exchanges fell out of use. The Paramount Film Exchange, which belonged to Paramount Pictures, was one of several film exchange buildings in the area. The Duquesne University Tamburitzans occupy the former location of the Warner Bros. exchange at 1801 Boulevard of the Allies, and the auction and real-estate firm Harry Davis & Co. is located next door, at 1725 Boulevard of the Allies, in the building that once housed 20th Century Fox's exchange.

The Paramount Film Exchange was the subject of a contentious battle over historic preservation in Pittsburgh, which is redeveloping many of the older neighborhoods in its urban core. Initial attention to the Paramount Film Exchange came in 2008, when 21-year-old Drew Levinson entered and won a video contest sponsored by the Young Preservationists Association of Pittsburgh (YPA) with his short film on the Paramount Film Exchange. Levinson's video rallied support behind saving the Film Exchange from sale or demolition by then-owner University of Pittsburgh Medical Center (UPMC). In 2009, YPA proposed the Paramount Film Exchange for official historical designation by the City of Pittsburgh. The Historic Review Commission of the City of Pittsburgh granted landmark designation in early 2010 based on "the importance of a particular place to Pittsburgh's heritage." The YPA attributed the site's historical significance to its status as the last remnant of Pittsburgh's "film row". UPMC and the Exchange's other large institutional neighbor, Duquesne University, both opposed landmarking the building, while Rick Schweikert and his co-investors in PFEX, Inc. did not. The proposal moved to City Council, which in a preliminary vote on Jan. 20, 2010, approved historic designation for the Exchange by an 8-1 margin.

== Gallery ==
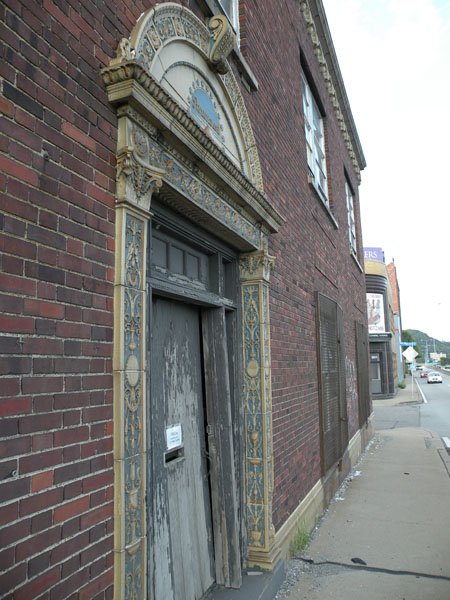
The film exchange's elaborately decorated front door located at 1727 Boulevard of the Allies.

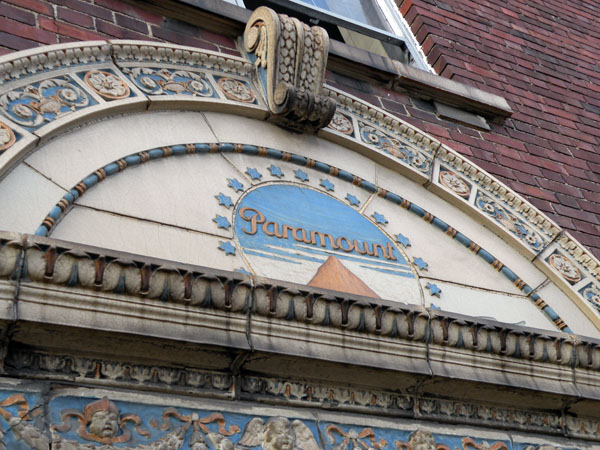
A closer view of the film exchange's front door.

== See also ==
- Detroit Film Exchange Building, another 1920s exchange
- Oklahoma City Film Exchange District from the same era
