= Orchestra Hall (Detroit) =

Music venue in Detroit, Michigan

Max M. and Marjorie S. Fisher Music Center
- Paradise Theater
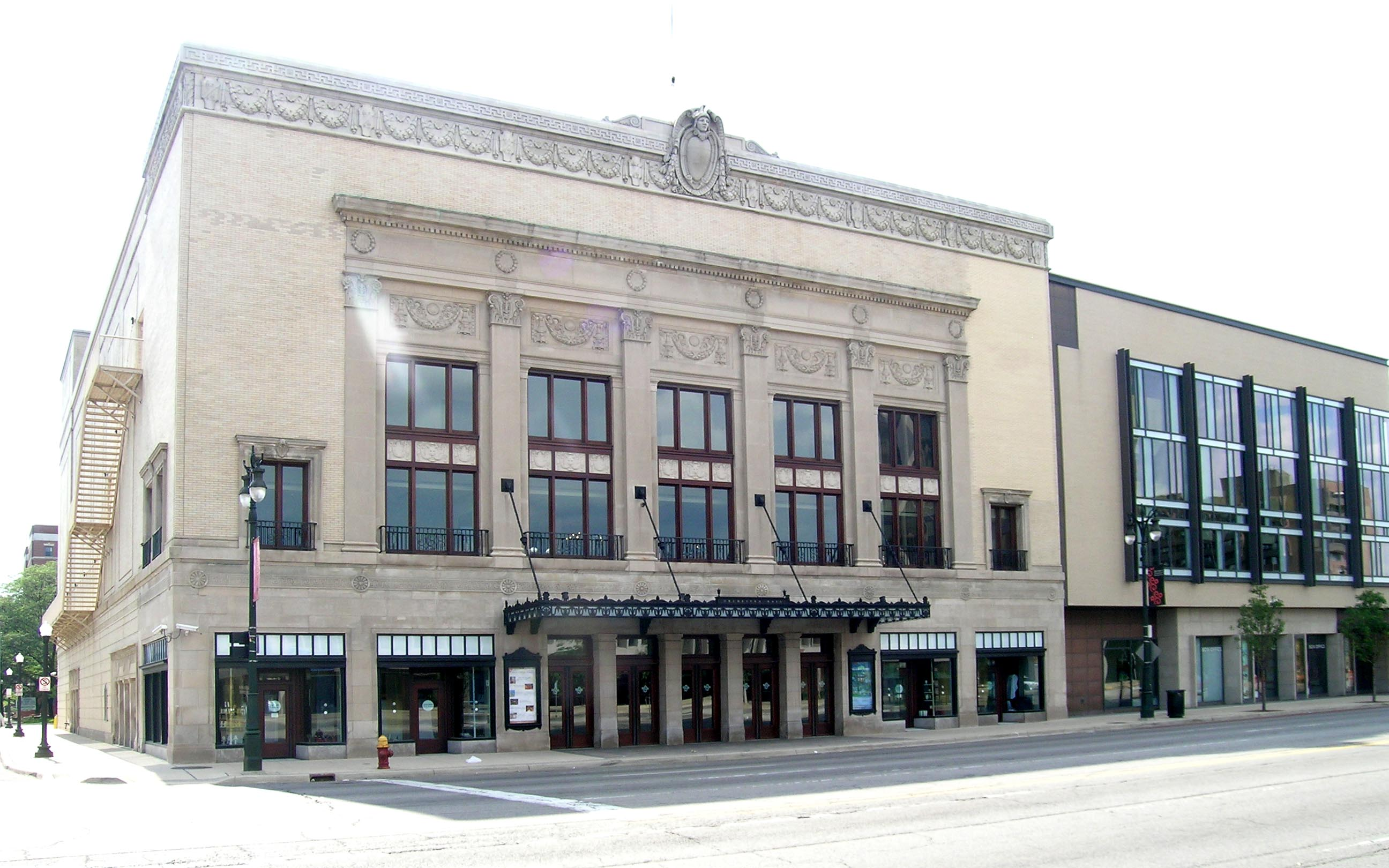
- Orchestra Hall and Max M. and Marjorie S. Fisher Music Center
- Interactive map of Max M. and Marjorie S. Fisher Music Center
- Address: 3711 Woodward Avenue; Detroit, Michigan; United States
- Operator: Detroit Symphony Orchestra
- Capacity: Orchestra Hall: 2,000; The Cube: 450
- Type: Concert hall
- Public transit: QLine Mack/MLK; DDOT 4, 31; SMART FAST Woodward 461, 462

Construction
- Opened: 1919
- Reopened: 1989, 2003

Website
- www.dso.org
- Orchestra Hall
- U.S. National Register of Historic Places
- Michigan State Historic Site
- Coordinates: 42°20′55.49″N 83°3′33.48″W
- Architect: C. Howard Crane
- Architectural style: Beaux-Arts
- NRHP reference No.: 71000429
- Added to NRHP: April 16, 1971

Orchestra Hall is a concert hall at 3711 Woodward Avenue in Midtown Detroit, Michigan, United States. The hall is renowned for its superior acoustic properties and serves as the home of the internationally known Detroit Symphony Orchestra (DSO), the fourth oldest orchestra in the United States. With the creation of an adjoining auditorium for jazz and chamber music in 2003, Orchestra Hall became part of the Max M. and Marjorie S. Fisher Music Center. It was listed on the National Register of Historic Places in 1971.

== History ==
The Detroit Symphony Orchestra had previously played at the old Detroit Opera House. However, Ossip Gabrilowitsch demanded that the DSO build a suitable auditorium before he assumed his position as music director. Construction on Orchestra Hall began on June 6, 1919, and was completed in barely six months.

The 2,014-seat hall was designed by the noted theater architect, C. Howard Crane. The first concert took place on October 23, 1919, and the hall remained the home of the Detroit Symphony Orchestra until 1939. In 1924 Mr. and Mrs. William H. Murphy gifted a large 4-manual, 72-rank, 4,355-pipe Casavant Frères organ to the DSO and Orchestra Hall "so long as the society remained integrally what it was". The organ's dedicatory concert was given March 17, 1924, by Marcel Dupré.

Due to the financial difficulties of the Great Depression, the orchestra was compelled to leave Orchestra Hall and enter into a more economical arrangement to share the Masonic Temple Theatre. Orchestra Hall was vacant for two years until it was purchased by new owners. For ten years Orchestra Hall presented jazz artists under the name Paradise Theater, opening on Christmas Eve 1941. The Paradise hosted the most renowned jazz musicians, including Ella Fitzgerald, Billie Holiday, Count Basie, and Duke Ellington. The entertainment at Paradise Theater often included a live act and a movie from a B movie studio like Republic Pictures, Monogram Pictures, or Producers Releasing Corporation. A typical show on October 27, 1944, featured Cab Calloway and his Cotton Club Orchestra on stage and the movie That's My Baby! (Monogram, 1944, Richard Arlen, Ellen Drew).

The terms of the Murphy organ's donation to Orchestra Hall were such that the title of the organ reverted back to the Murphys when the DSO vacated Orchestra Hall in 1929. The Murphys arranged for the organ to be donated to Detroit's Calvary Presbyterian Church. A lawsuit was filed to compel Paradise Theater management to allow the organ's removal; the move was eventually carried out by the Toledo Pipe Organ Company and church members in the middle of the night.

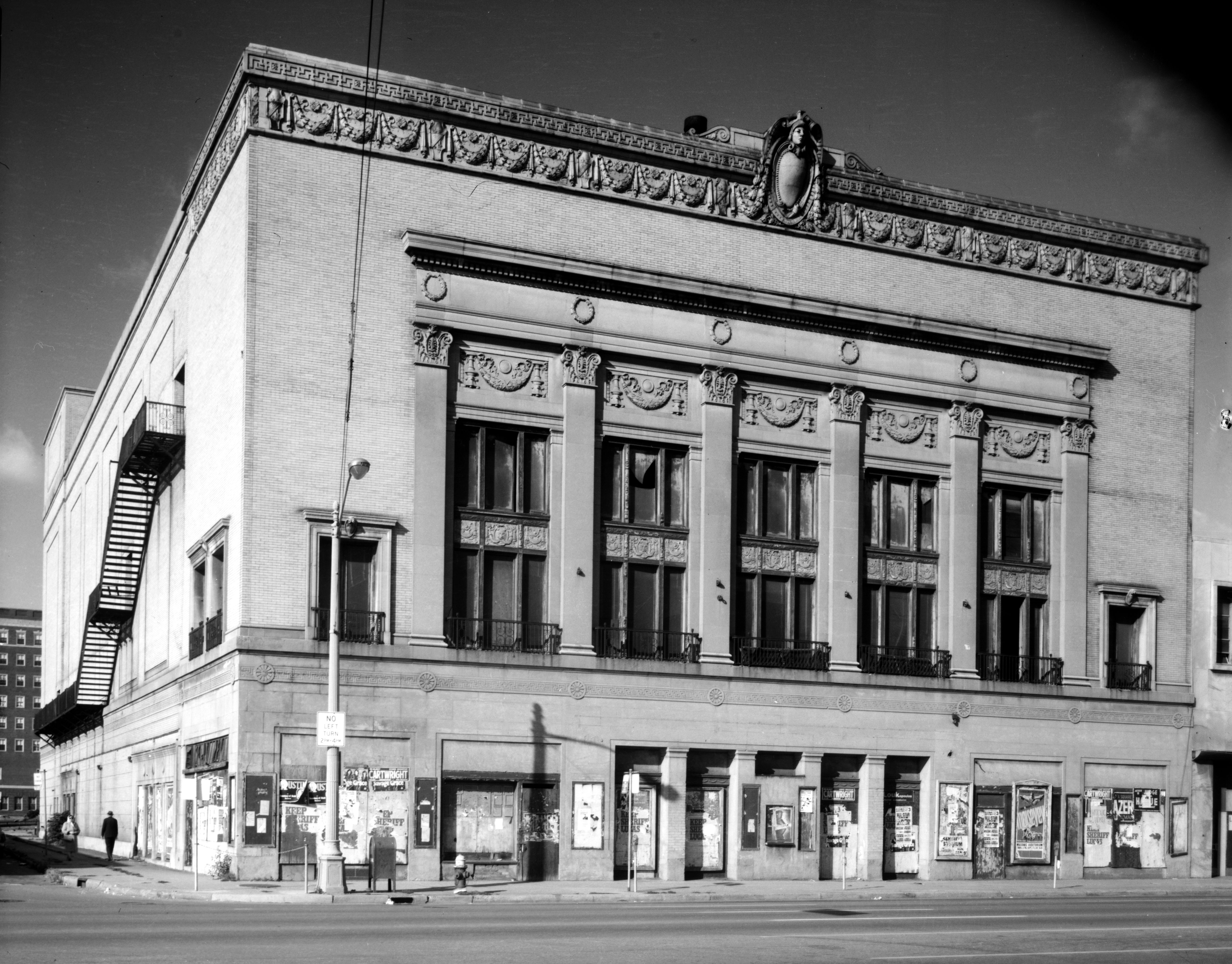
Orchestra Hall in 1970

The Paradise closed in 1951 and now Orchestra Hall sat vacant for nearly twenty years until the late 1960s when it was slated for demolition and the land used to construct a restaurant. Paul Ganson, the assistant principal bassoonist of the DSO, spearheaded a movement to rediscover the hall and raise funds to restore it. Renovation work started in 1970 and continued for about two decades, costing roughly $6.8 million. The original building required extensive renovations including: a new stage, all new seating, plaster and lath work, and restoration of historical decorations. All of the restoration work was completed with the goal of maintaining the fine acoustic properties that the hall was historically known for. The hall was added to the National Register of Historic Places in 1971. The DSO moved back into Orchestra Hall in 1989.

Additional work on the hall was done in the summer months of 2002 and 2003 as part of the creation of the new Max M. and Marjorie S. Fisher Music Center, or "the MAX", as it is known. The work included renovations to the original facility as well as an expansion which houses additional lobbies and reception areas, dressing rooms and storage facilities, rehearsal space and a 450-seat venue for more intimate performances.

The mayor of Detroit delivers the annual State of the City address at Orchestra Hall.
