= Fox Theatre (Detroit) =

Theater and former movie theater in Detroit, Michigan, US

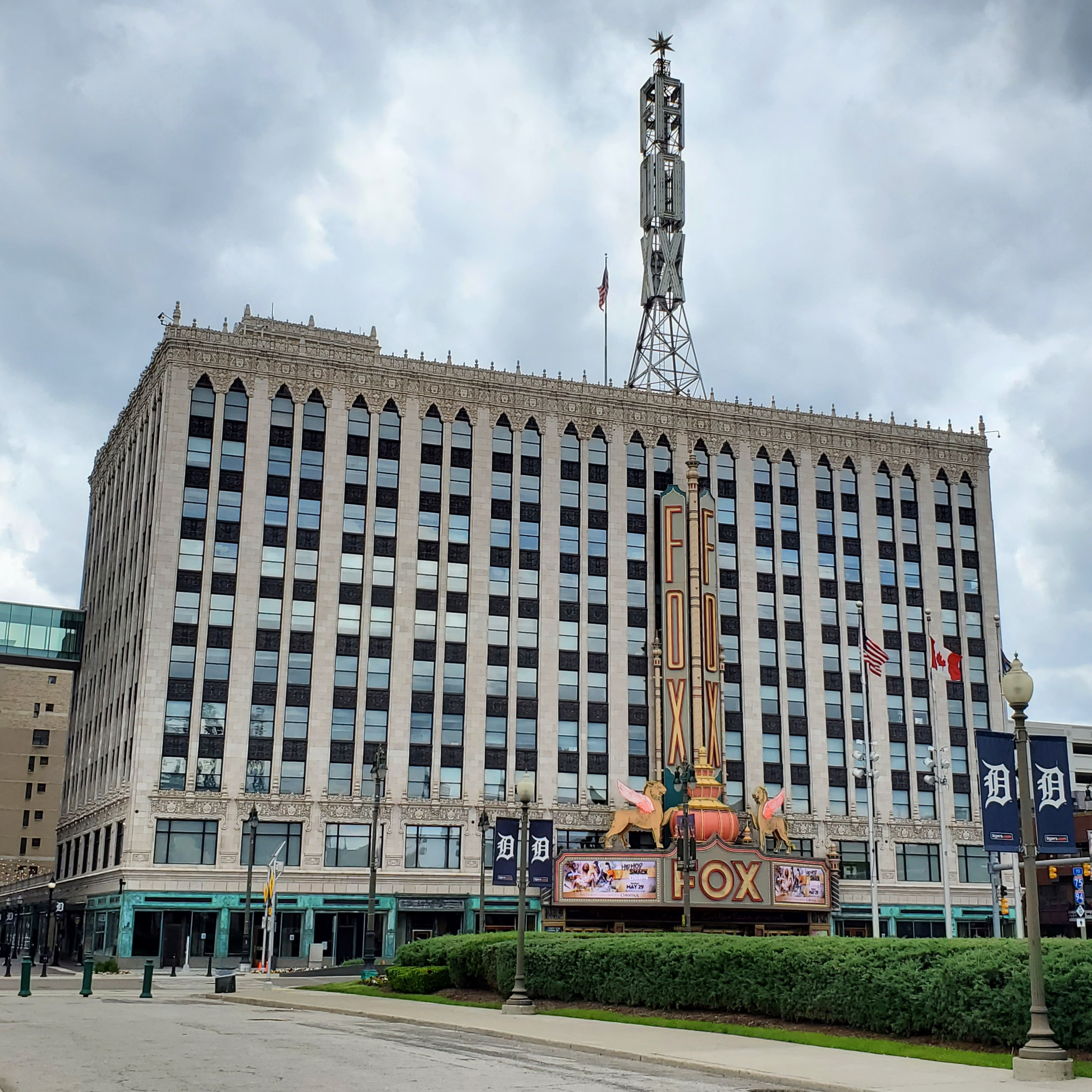
- The Woodward facade in 2022
- Interactive map of Fox Theatre
- Address: 2211 Woodward Avenue; Detroit, Michigan; 48201
- Owner: Olympia Entertainment
- Operator: 313 Presents
- Capacity: 5,174
- Type: Performing arts center
- Current use: live event venue
- Public transit: Grand Circus Park; Montcalm Street; SMART FAST Woodward 461, 462; DDOT 4

Construction
- Opened: 1928
- Reopened: November 19, 1988

Website
- olympiaentertainment.com
- Fox Theatre
- U.S. National Register of Historic Places
- U.S. National Historic Landmark
- Michigan State Historic Site
- Coordinates: 42°20′18.96″N 83°3′8.05″W
- Architects: C. Howard Crane; Restoration by William Kessler
- Architectural style: Art Deco with a blend of Burmese, Indian, Persian, Chinese, and Hindu motifs
- NRHP reference No.: 85000280

Significant dates
- Added to NRHP: February 14, 1985
- Designated NHL: June 29, 1989
- Designated MSHS: October 17, 1991

Fox Theatre is a performing arts center located at 2211 Woodward Avenue in Downtown Detroit, Michigan, near the Grand Circus Park Historic District. Opened in 1928 as a flagship movie palace in the Fox Theatres chain, it was at over 5,000 seats the largest theater in the city. Designed by theater architect C. Howard Crane, it was listed on the National Register of Historic Places in 1985.

It was designated a National Historic Landmark in 1989 for its architecture. The area surrounding the Fox is nicknamed Foxtown. The city's major performance centers and theatres emanate from the Fox Theatre and Grand Circus Park Historic District and continue along Woodward Avenue toward the Fisher Theatre in the city's New Center.

The Fox has 5,048 seats (5,174 seats if removable seats placed in the raised orchestra pit are included). It is the largest surviving movie palace of the 1920s and the largest of the original Fox Theatres. The Fox was fully restored in 1988. The adjacent office building houses the headquarters of Olympia Entertainment and Little Caesars.

== History ==
The Detroit Fox is one of five spectacular Fox Theatres built in the late 1920s by film pioneer William Fox. The others were the Fox Theatres in Brooklyn, Atlanta, St. Louis, and San Francisco. Architect C. Howard Crane designed the Fox with an "exotic" interior appropriating Burmese, Chinese, Indian and Persian motifs. There are three levels of seating, the Main Floor above the orchestra pit, the Mezzanine, and the Gallery (balcony).

The exterior of the attached 10-story office building features a façade with Asian motifs which, when illuminated at night, can be seen for several blocks. The Fox Theatre in St. Louis, Missouri is (on the interior) its near architectural twin with about 500 fewer seats. The 10-story Detroit Fox Theatre building also contains the headquarters of Olympia Entertainment, while the St. Louis Fox is a stand-alone theatre. The architectural plaster molds of the Detroit Fox (1928) were re-used on the St. Louis Fox (1929).

The Fox opened in 1928 and remained Detroit's premier movie destination for decades. Unlike many neighboring theatres, it operated continually until it was closed in the early 1980s for restoration. By the 1960s, the venue was showing its age and maintenance of many key areas was deferred. By the 1970s mezzanine and balcony seating areas were closed to the public.

In 1984 Chuck Forbes, owner of the State and Gem theaters, proposed a renovation project. These plans were never fully realized, but in 1988 the theater was acquired by new owners, Mike and Marian Ilitch, who fully restored the Fox at a cost of $12 million. Their company, Ilitch Holdings, Inc., is headquartered in the Fox Theater Office Building. The downtown area near Grand Circus Park which encompasses Fox Theatre is sometimes referred to as Foxtown after the theater. In 2000, Comerica Park opened and helped to revitalize the neighborhood along with the construction of Ford Field in 2002, and Little Caesars Arena in 2017.

=== Productions ===
The gala opening took place September 21, 1928, and featured the silent film Street Angel starring Janet Gaynor. The live show depicted a history of Detroit from its settlement in 1701 to the present. Productions included feature-length movies, shorts and newsreels, and performances by the 60-piece Fox Theatre Grand Orchestra, a 50-voice choir and a 32-member chorus line called the Tillerettes. This was Fox's version of producer Samuel "Roxy" Rothafel's Roxyettes.

In the 1930s, Shirley Temple made appearances when the theater showed her films. During World War II, like many theaters in the area, the Fox operated 24 hours a day to accommodate defense plant workers on afternoon and evening shifts. The theater routinely grossed $75,000 a week when admission was 35 cents. In 1953, the theater was the first in Michigan equipped for CinemaScope and premiered the epic picture The Robe.

In May 1956, the theater hosted three performances by Elvis Presley. During the 1960s, the theater hosted performances by many Motown recording artists, but by the 1970s the theater was showing its age. Unlike other downtown Detroit theaters in the 1970s, such as the Michigan and United Artists, the Fox was able to remain open by programming Blaxploitation and martial arts films.

The first production at the Fox after restoration was a November 19, 1988, concert with Joe Williams and the Count Basie Orchestra. Since then, notable performances include a concert with Frank Sinatra, Sammy Davis Jr. and Liza Minnelli which was recorded and broadcast on the Showtime cable network in 1989 and a 1990 performance by Victor Borge which was recorded for broadcast on PBS and later incorporated into his DVD Victor Borge: Then and Now. The theater hosted the WWE Hall of Fame ceremony on March 31, 2007, the night before WrestleMania 23 was held at nearby Ford Field. The prior evening, March 30, 2007, the theater hosted the world premiere of the film The Condemned.

Live productions have included touring companies of Blue's Clues Live!, David Copperfield, Donny Osmond, Dora the Explorer Live, Fairuz, Go Diego Go! Live, Irving Berlin's White Christmas, Riverdance, Sesame Street Live, What's Done in the Dark and Yo Gabba Gabba! Live. The Radio City Christmas Spectacular was an annual favorite from 1997 through 2005. Both the interior and exterior of The Fox were used in a Chrysler commercial for its Chrysler 200, featuring Eminem, that aired during Super Bowl XLV in February 2011.

Australian children's music group The Wiggles performed at the theater on August 20 and 21, 2003 with their "Wiggly Safari" tour, August 17 and 18, 2004 with their "The Wiggles In Concert!" tour, September 22, 2013 with their "Taking Off!: Live in Concert" tour, October 11, 2015 with their "Rock & Roll Preschool!" tour, and August 26, 2019 with their "Party Time!" tour.

Detroit's Fox Theatre has hosted the following Michigan musicians: Aretha Franklin in 1994 and 2012, The Temptations in 1988, Stevie Wonder in 1969, The Spinners in 1977, Smokey Robinson in 1988, Al Green in 1989, Diana Ross in 1990, Alice Cooper in 1990, Iggy Pop and The Stooges in 2007, Kid Rock in 2012, Jack White in 2014, and Greta Van Fleet in 2018. Chris Cornell of Soundgarden played his final show there on May 17, 2017.

On July 30 and 31, 2019, the theatre was the site of a two-night primary debate among the announced candidates seeking the Democratic nomination for the 2020 presidential race.

== Architecture ==
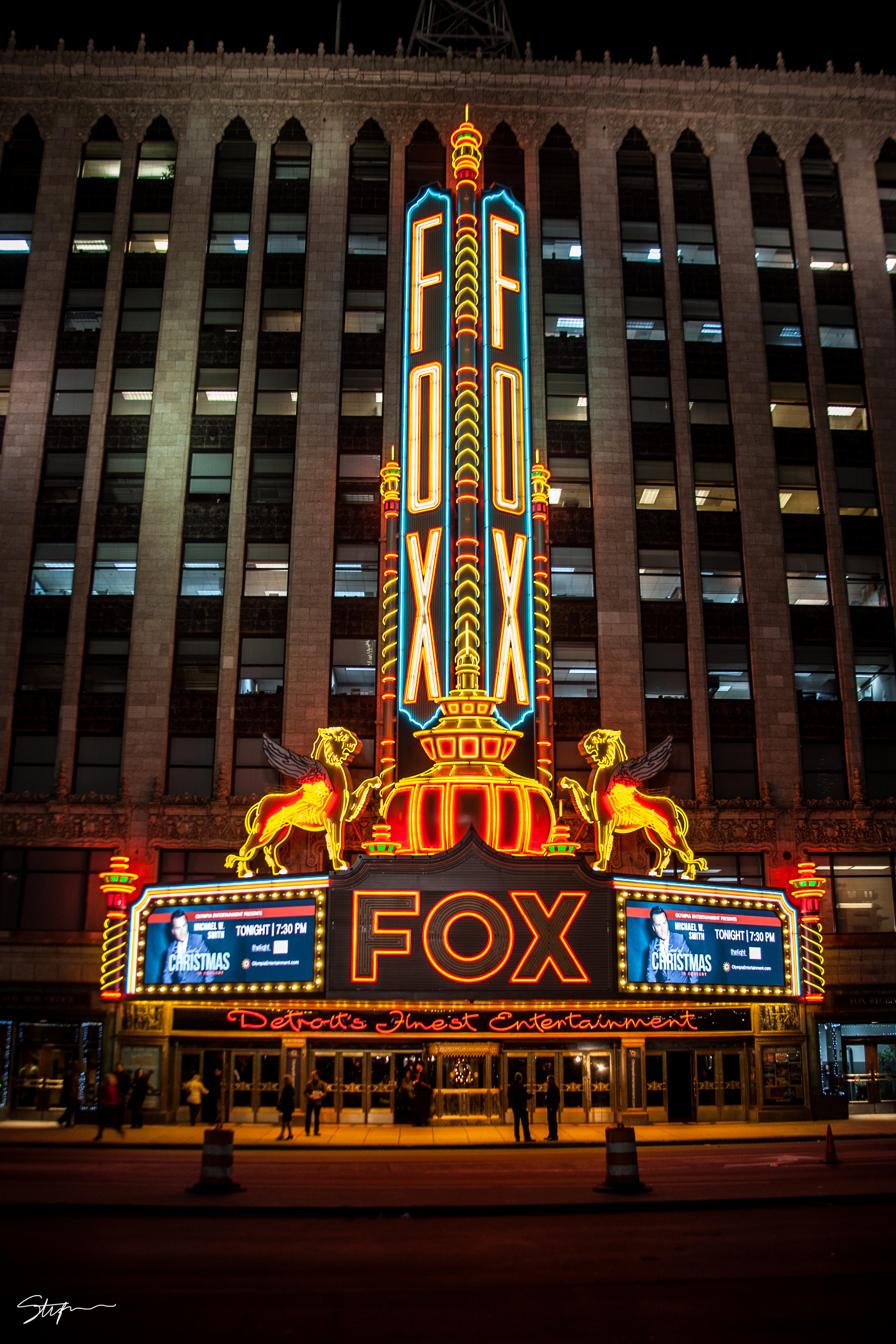
Night view with the 2015 LED marquee

The Fox Office Building, which forms the Woodward façade of the theatre, is 10 stories in height. The front and sides of the office tower are faced with a cream-colored terracotta. There are decorative lintels above the windows on the second and tenth floor. The building wraps around the theatre lobby creating a u-shaped floor plan. The auditorium and rear of the office tower are faced with brick.

The current marquee was installed during the 1987 restoration but is based on the original which itself was replaced in the 1950s. It was updated with a new supporting structure, digital video screens and LEDs in 2015.

The original configuration of the street and second floors contained 20 retail spaces on each level. Spaces featured large display windows looking into the corridors and ground floor spaces also had access directly from the street.

Office space occupied the third through tenth floor and featured marble floors and wainscoting in the corridors. Office doors featured full-length glass with glass transoms above to allow light and ventilation into the corridors. Many of these features remained when the 1987 restoration began with the exception of the seventh floor which was altered in the 1970s to accommodate a Social Security Administration office.

The theatre entrance on Woodward has 16 doors that open onto the storm lobby. It has a black and white marble floor and small ornate plaster alcoves in the ceiling. The storm lobby opens into the main lobby which is approximately 87 feet (27 m) deep and six floors high. The floor is terrazzo with brass inlays that was unseen until the 1988 renovation.

Eve Leo, wife of Fox President William Fox, was unhappy when she learned that the theatre was to have a bare floor. She insisted it needed carpeting, so it was covered with what was the largest single-piece wool rug ever manufactured in America. The rug covered 3,600 square feet (330 m^{2}) of the lobby floor and weighed 3,000 pounds (1,400 kg).

Above the entrance doors are faux organ pipes fashioned from plaster, and in a balcony to the upper left is a 3-manual, 13-rank Moller organ with the real pipes in the chamber above the console. The Fox's Moller is the only one still in situ. On each side of the lobby are eight vermillion scagliola columns. The columns rise from black octagonal bases and are adorned with eagles, flowers, glass jewels highlighted by silver leaf to a height of approximately 12 ft (3.7 m).

The Corinthian capitals are silver leafed and bear images of a variety of animals and birds. The columns support plaster beams decorated with faces, starbursts and cartouches. Between the columns are small balconies on the mezzanine and balcony levels that overlook the main floor. The ceiling is blue with a sunburst design surrounded by Fox griffins.

At the rear of the lobby, the grand staircase leads to the mezzanine level. Two plaster lions with jeweled eyes guard the base of the stairs. Fish-like creatures adorn the balustrades. On the mezzanine level, four columns frame two-story windows enclosing the auditorium. A loggia above the windows allows patrons on the balcony level to look down into the lobby.

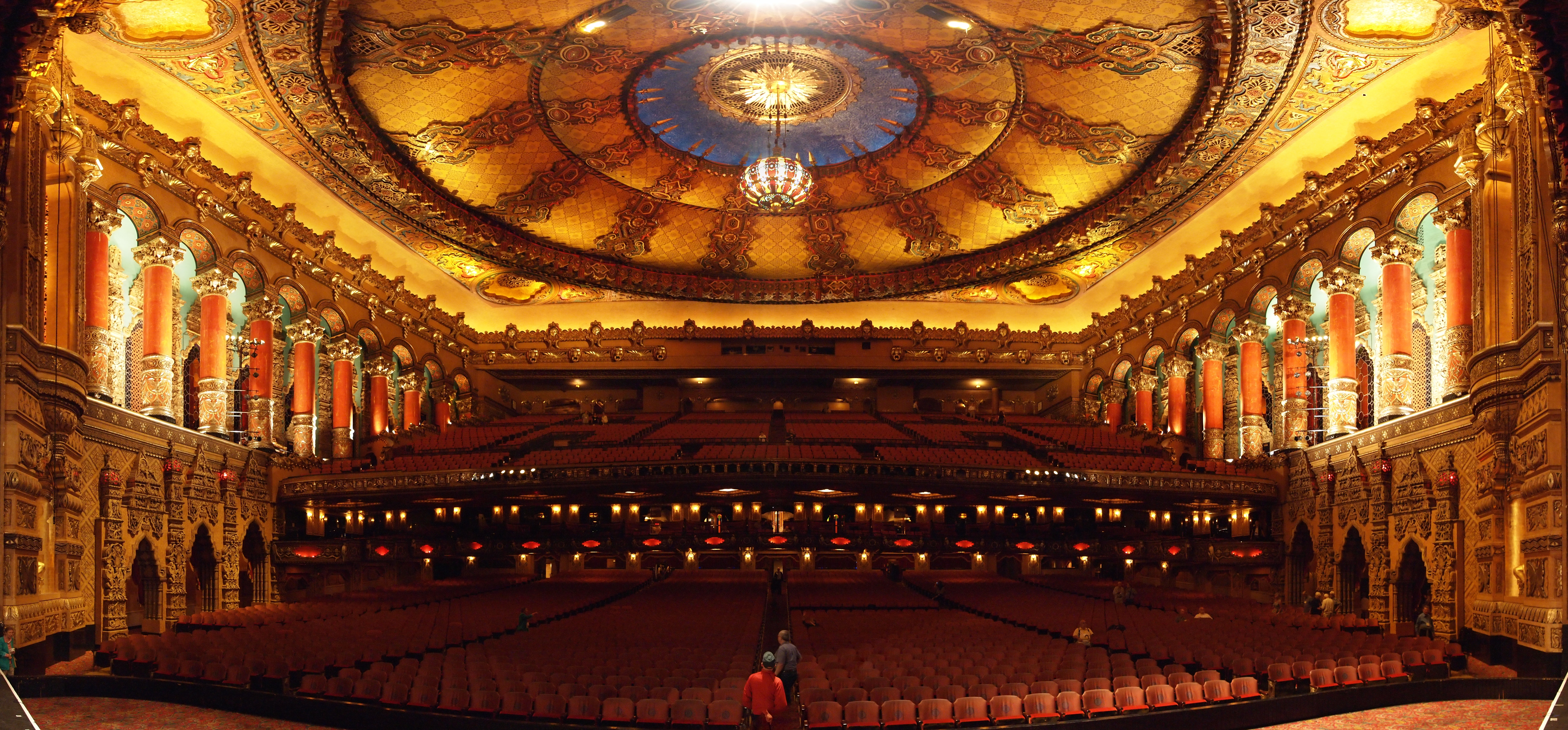
Auditorium view from the stage

Flanking the grand stairs are doors leading to the 2,898 orchestra-level seats. The auditorium is 108 ft (33 m) high and 175 ft (53 m) wide. An inner lobby wraps around the seating area and contains two oval stairways leading to upper seating levels and the lounges on the lower level. The walls of the auditorium are shades of beige and are adorned with molded plaster plants, human faces, geometric designs, birds and animals.

The proscenium is 70 ft (21 m) and 30 ft (9.1 m) high. Like the side walls, it is adorned with animals, human figures, starbursts and flowers. Above the center of the proscenium is an elephant's head. Suspended below the elephant is a large quatrefoil-shaped censer that conceals speakers. The backstage area originally had 18 performer dressing rooms, offices and a broadcast booth. In the basement were staff dressing rooms, workshops, an infirmary, screening room and storage rooms.

The orchestra pit and sections of the stage can be raised and lowered on hydraulic lifts. The stage is 78 ft (24 m) wide, 32 ft (9.8 m) deep and houses the four-manual 36-rank Wurlitzer organ. This organ was constructed especially for the theatre and is one of the few theatre organs in the world that remains in its original installation.

On the side walls at the orchestra level are Moorish arches extending to the balcony. Above is a colonnade at the balcony level with nine vermillion scagliola columns matching those in the lobby. The columns support decorated arches and behind the first three are grilles that conceal the bays containing the 2,700 pipes and other effects for the organ. The areas between the other columns are filled with tinted mirrors. The walls are topped with a cornice decorated with lion and human faces set among geometric designs and sunbursts.

The ceiling is designed to resemble a round tent with an oculus supported by spears. The tent drapes slightly and is covered with acoustical felt bearing a stenciled design. The ceiling of the oculus is blue with a globe chandelier of colored glass suspended from a starburst design. The chandelier is 13 ft (4.0 m) in diameter weighs 2,000 lb (910 kg) and contains 1,200 pieces of glass.

The projection booth was one of the largest of its day and originally housed four projectors, three spotlights and a Brenograph Machine to produce special effects.

== See also ==
- The Fillmore Detroit
- National Register of Historic Places listings in Downtown and Midtown Detroit
