= Government of Detroit =

Municipal government in Michigan, US

The flag of Detroit

The government of Detroit, Michigan mayor, the nine-member Detroit City Council, the eleven-member Board of Police Commissioners, and a clerk. All of these officers are elected on a nonpartisan ballot, with the exception of four of the police commissioners, who are appointed by the mayor. Detroit has a "strong mayoral" system, with the mayor approving departmental appointments. The council approves budgets, but the mayor is not obligated to adhere to any earmarking. The city clerk supervises elections and is formally charged with the maintenance of municipal records. City ordinances and substantially large contracts must be approved by the council.

The 2012 Charter added political bodies to council districts called Community Advisory Councils. They are created by the circulation of petitions by residents. In March 2014 The Detroit City Council passed an ordinance that formalized the directive given in the City Charter. Members of the Seventh District CAC were elected in the 2016 general election on November 8. In October 2019 a local activist submitted petitions to make District 4 Detroit's second CAC. Members were elected to it in the 2020 general election. In 2022 District 5 residents elected their first Community Advisory Council as well.

Municipal elections for Mayor, City Council, City Clerk and Community Advisory Council Members are held in years following presidential elections (such as 2013, 2017 and 2021).

In 2018 the people of Detroit voted to revise the city charter, and elected a Charter Commission for that purpose. The revised charter could have substantially changed the structure of the government of Detroit if it was approved. However voters rejected the revisions in the 2021 primary election.

== City departments ==
City departments include:

- Detroit Fire Department
- Detroit Police Department
- Detroit Public Schools
- Detroit Department of Transportation
- Detroit Water and Sewerage Department
- Detroit Health Department

== Courts ==
William Woodbridge, the first justice of the territorial Supreme Court.

Detroit's courts are all state-administered and elections are nonpartisan. The Circuit and Probate Courts for Wayne County are located in the Coleman A. Young Municipal Center (formerly the "City-County Building"). Circuit and probate judges are elected county-wide, with circuit judges handling all cases where more than $25,000 is in dispute, felonies, divorce/custody actions, and matters of general equitable jurisdictions. Probate Court is responsible for estate administration, guardianships, conservatorships and juvenile matters. The divorce/family court docket is run jointly with the Circuit Court.

The 36th District Court, with judges elected citywide, handles civil disputes where less than $25,000 is in dispute, landlord-tenant matters, misdemeanors, and preliminary examinations of criminal defendants charged with felonies prior to being bound over to circuit court. The 36th District Court incorporated the city's common pleas, traffic court, and misdemeanor prosecutions.

In addition to these trial courts, Detroit hosts the 1st District of the Michigan Court of Appeals, located at Cadillac Place, and the United States District Court for the Eastern District of Michigan located in the Theodore Levin Federal Courthouse building in Downtown Detroit.

== City finances ==
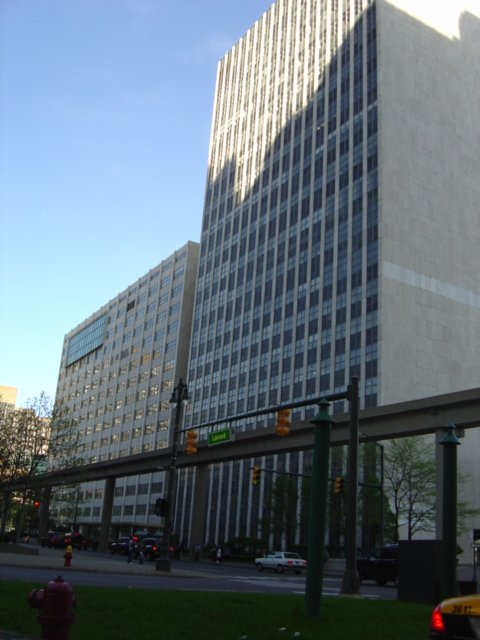
The Coleman A. Young Municipal Center.

In addition to property tax, the city levies an income tax of 2.4% on residents, 1.2% on non-residents, and 2.0% on corporations since 2013. Revenue is also obtained from utility taxes, hotel excises and from the Detroit-owned Water and Sewer system that provides most of the fresh water and sewage treatment facilities within the metropolitan area. Detroit has had to fight off legislative efforts to turn control of the system to the suburbs.

The city has experienced some fiscal years of balanced budgets in the new millennium with new growth in business and tourism. The city has planned a reduced workforce and more consolidated operations. In addition, Detroit had asked for pay cuts and other "give backs" from the municipal unions that represent city employees.

On March 1, 2013, Governor Rick Snyder announced the state was taking over the financial control of the city from the local government. The state is requesting a review team to look over the financial state of the city and determine if an emergency manager is needed to take over control of city spending from city council. On March 14, 2013, Michigan's Local Emergency Financial Assistance Loan Board appointed an Emergency Financial Manager, Kevyn Orr. Mr. Orr assumed his receivership responsibilities on March 25, 2013.

On July 18, 2013, Detroit filed the largest municipal bankruptcy case in U.S. history, from which it exited on December 10, 2014.

== Law ==
The city is governed pursuant to the Home Rule Charter of the City of Detroit, and the Detroit City Code is the codification of Detroit's local ordinances. Unless a violation of the code or other ordinance is specifically designated as a municipal civil infraction (or unless expressly otherwise required by applicable state or federal laws), the violation is a misdemeanor. Where there is a conflict with the Wayne County Code, the most liberal interpretation of the most restrictive, or the one imposing the most desirable, standard shall prevail.

== Sister cities ==
Sister cities include:

- Toyota City, Japan
- Dubai, United Arab Emirates
- Turin, Italy
- Minsk, Belarus
- Kitwe, Zambia
- Nassau, Bahamas
- Chongqing, China

International border city:

- Windsor, Canada

== See also ==
- Government of Michigan
- Cadillac Place
- Flag of Detroit
- Guardian Building
- Patrick V. McNamara Federal Building
- Urban development in Detroit
- Wayne County, Michigan
- Wayne State University
