= List of flags of Michigan =

This list of flags of Michigan includes flags associated with the U.S. state of Michigan, including the state flag, the governor's flag, flags of units of the Michigan Army National Guard, municipal flags, and historical state flags. The current state flag, adopted in 1911, consists of the coat of arms of Michigan on a blue field, while the governor's flag uses the same arms on a white field. The list also includes the flags of Detroit and Grand Rapids, as well as earlier Michigan flags dating from the 19th and early 20th centuries.

== State flag ==
Flag	Date	Use	Description
	1911–present	State and civil flag	A blue field with the Coat of arms of Michigan defaced in the center. 2:3 aspect ratio.
	1911–present	Governor's flag	Flag used by the governor. Based on the Brady Guard flag. Same as the State flag, but with a white field instead of a blue field.

== Military flags ==
Flag	Date	Use	Description
		Michigan Army National Guard	A blue field, defaced with the emblem of the Michigan Army National Guard.
		Michigan ARNG 63rd Troop Command	A tricolor of blue-maize-blue, defaced with the emblem of the Michigan Army National Guard.

== City flags ==
Flag	Date	Use	Description
	1948 (most recent version from 2000)	Flag of Detroit	City seal emblazoned on quartered background.
		Flag of Grand Rapids	A vertical tricolor of blue-white-blue defaced with the Seal of Grand Rapids
	1865-1911	Flag of Grand Rapids (Logo)	A blue field containing the city's logo. This flag is often used for civil use, while the official flag generally remains for government use.

== Historic flags ==
Flag	Date	Use	Description
	1837	Brady Guard Flag	The obverse shows the Coat of arms of Michigan on a white background, flanked by a woman and a soldier. the Reverse features a portrait of Stevens T. Mason, the first Governor of Michigan during statehood.
	1865-1911	State flag (reverse)	From 1865 to 1911, the reverse of the Flag of Michigan featured the Great Seal of the United States.
