= Morningside, Detroit =

Neighborhood of Detroit, Michigan, United States

Coordinates: 42.3992°N 82.9447°W

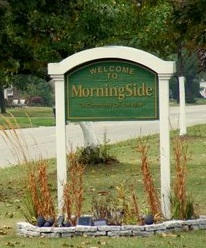
Welcome to Morningside

Morningside is a neighborhood on the east side of Detroit, Michigan. The area is bounded by Harper Avenue and Interstate 94 on the north, Mack Avenue to the south, East Outer Drive and Whittier on the east and Alter Road and East Outer Drive to the west. The local association that shares the name Morningside with the community is a collaboration of residents working together to take care of this area. Michigan Public has made Morningside the subject of in depth coverage.

== History ==
Morningside began as a French settlement of ribbon farms late in the 1700s. Since the only reliable method of travel was by boat or canoe, access to Lake Saint Clair and the Detroit River was a necessity. French settlers established “ribbon farms” which were long narrow strips of land that stretched inland for miles. These narrow farms each provided access to waterways for drinking water, fishing and transportation; and to the land for timber, farming and game. Some of the ribbon farms that would later become part of Morningside were owned by Alec Trombly, P. Trombly, Robert Trombly, Mrs. L. Brown, Mrs. Turner and G. Martin.

These ribbon farms were collectively part of Grosse Pointe Township, until the end of the 19th century, when Detroit annexed “large portions of the township of Grosse Pointe.” Detroit's population had grown in response to auto manufacturing. Jobs were plentiful and working wages supported middle-class mobility. Ribbon farms, which had been farmed for decades, now were redeveloped into sub-divisions for housing. The Morningside neighborhood blossomed in response to Detroit's middle-class housing needs into a collection of real estate sub-divisions.

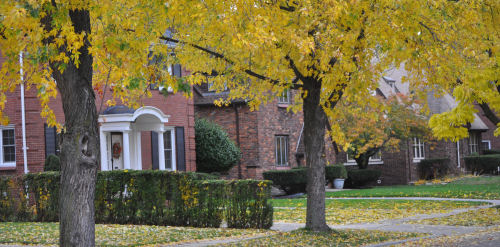
Brick homes characteristic of the Morningside neighborhood.

Alter Road stretches through the Morningside community and Detroit's east side and runs roughly four miles in length. In recent history, The Detroit Grosse Pointe Collaborative has been working to revitalize the east side of Detroit which leads to Grosse Pointe Park. The plan has revolved around promoting real estate development, beautification efforts, community organizing and long-term maintenance.

In 2014 the governments of Grosse Pointe Park and Detroit reached an agreement to establish a gateway between the two communities and to remove a marketplace along Alter Road that was viewed as separating the two communities.

== Architecture ==
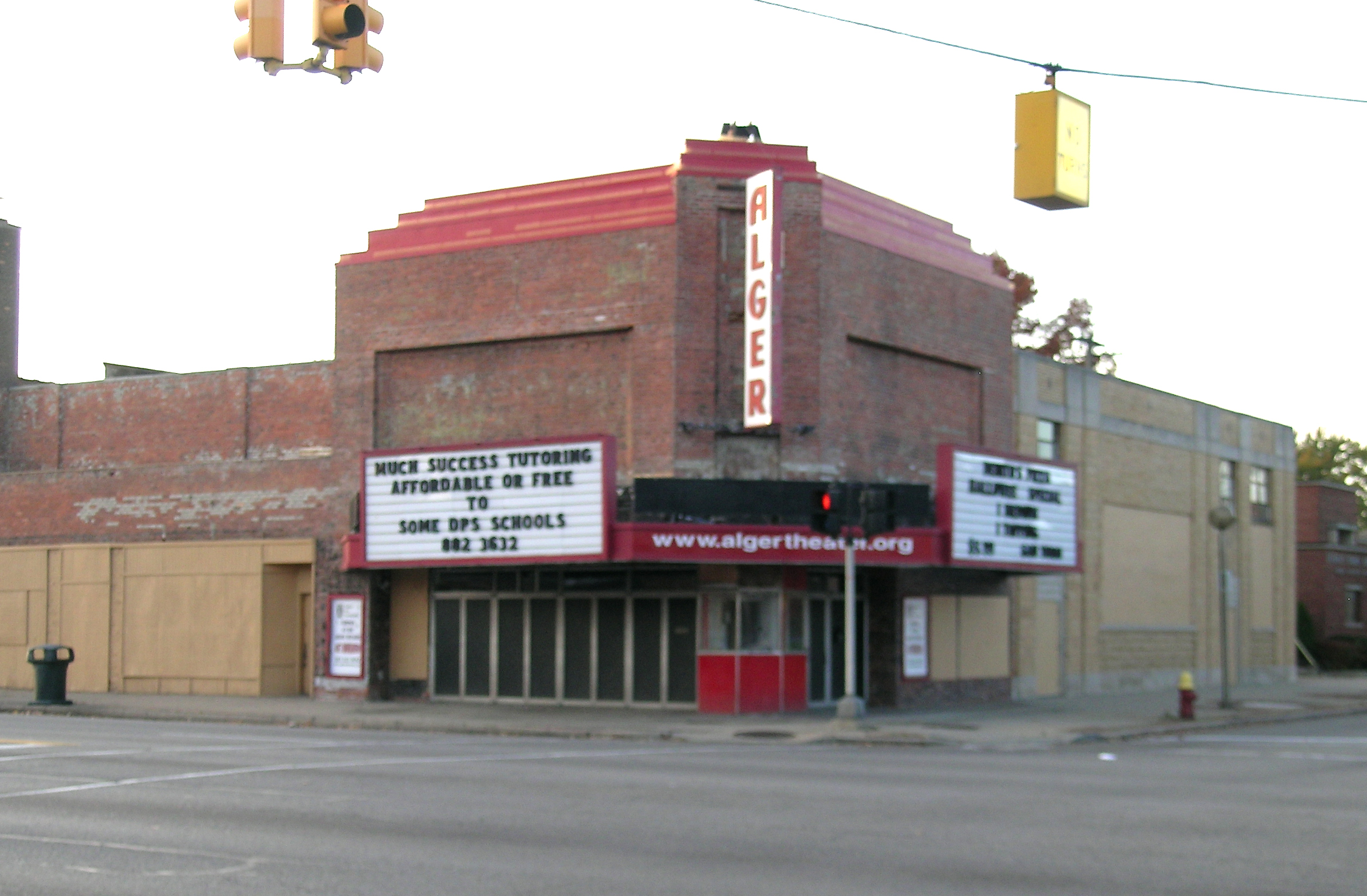
The Alger Theater is listed in the National Register of Historic Places.

Initially constructed in 1935, the Art Moderne style Alger Theater is one of two unchanged neighborhood movie theaters left in Detroit. The historic theater sits on the northwest corner of East Warren Avenue and Outer Drive. It stands as a representation of Detroit's historic past, retaining much of its historic building materials and served its purpose of film watching for fifty years. It opened its doors on August 22, 1935, to roughly 1200 excited Detroiters who lined up eagerly for a viewing of “The Girl from Tenth Avenue” starring Bette Davis.

Originally opened by George W. Trendle, who later purchased radio station WXYZ, the theater was named after Michigan Governor Russell A. Alger, who served in the American Civil War and held the post of Secretary of War under President William McKinley in 1897. In 1983, a non-profit group, the Friends of Alger Theater, formed to save the theater from being demolished and holds music events and fundraisers to renovate the theater.

== Government ==
The Jefferson Branch of the Detroit Public Library was opened at its current location on East Outer Drive on October 4, 1951, the first National Library Day. It is named for the author of the Declaration of Independence and the third President of the United States, Thomas Jefferson. In addition to the lending of its 53,000 book titles, the library provides an array of other services for all ages including the lending of magazines, videos, audio cassettes, and the provision of Internet access. Services also include income tax forms January through April, student financial aid forms, computers for public use, core collection of Career & Employment Information Center materials and a copy machine.

Residents of Morningside reside in the Eastern District of police service provided by the Detroit Police Department. The district is made up of the former fifth and ninth precincts, which have been consolidated. The community of Morningside has a lieutenant designated to tend to their needs specifically.

The city of Detroit has four neighborhood resource centers that connect the neighborhoods and their institutions to the city government known as Community Access Centers (CAC, formerly Neighborhood City Halls). A few of the duties of these centers are to assist community associations and block clubs in planning events, recruiting volunteers for the annual Motor City Makeover and Angels' Night events and providing bus and tax help. The Morningside community is served by the East District which is managed by Ray Solomon II.

== Institutions ==
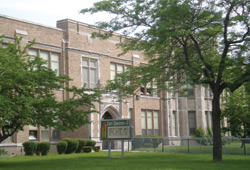
John E. Clark Preparatory Academy

The Morningside Community is home to John E. Clark Preparatory Academy. It has been a neighborhood elementary school for nearly 100 years. The school is part of the Detroit Public School system and teaches grade levels beginning at kindergarten and up to fifth grade. The community and Morningside have made the school a focal point in cleanup efforts and stabilization. The elementary school received a grant from the Lowes Harper Woods store valued at 100,000 dollars which will pay for a new kitchen and sewing room. The school took on new initiatives in 2010, including enforcement of school uniforms for all the children and changing their name from Clark Elementary to J.E. Clark Preparatory Academy. Part of their mission is to enable their students to become productive citizens that can meet the needs of a global society.

Historically, the school was named after John Clark, a physician and chemist who served on the Board of Education. The school was built on an area of land that was once called the “Old Rifle Range” on the city's east side. The school sits on Bremen Street between Balfour Road and Buckingham Road.

The Ronald Brown Academy is a Pre K-8th grade elementary school located on East Outer Drive in Morningside. The school was named after the first African American Secretary of Commerce. Students who attend the Ronald Brown Academy are offered enrichment and learning experiences such as the science club, sports, modern and ballroom dancing, French Club, the science fair, art, band, chess, glee club and the gospel choir. The academy is a Skillman High Performing School and won one of the six National School Change Awards from the Panasonic Corporation in 2008, which included $5000 and a chance for students to be participants in a national research project focusing on school change.

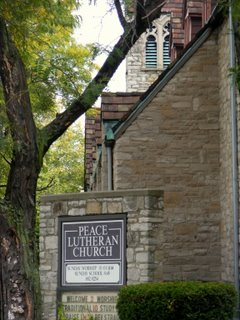
Peace Lutheran Church

Peace Lutheran Church is a multi-cultural congregation in the Morningside Neighborhood located at 15700 East Warren. They believe that to have a better city, we need to have a better neighborhood. To that end, Peace not only offers worship and Bible study opportunities but “we believe in caring for those in our midst by offering a variety of personal services.” Peace Lutheran Church is a Faith in Action Partner with Habitat for Humanity within the Morningside community. They also host the Morningside community group's meetings the second Tuesday of every month.

Metro Central Church of Christ, located at 4455 Barham, has been a part of the community since 1999. They hold Bible studies, visit sick and shut in members and host a youth group. The congregation also has a very active music group, Voices of Metro.

Bethany Lutheran Church and School were founded in 1889. They moved to their current location in on East Outer Drive in Morningside in 1942. The school is no longer in operation, but the church remains open for worship.

St. Matthew Parish is a Catholic church located at Whittier and Harper. They hold services five days per week excluding Tuesday and Thursday. The church was founded in 1927.

The Christ United Methodist Church is also located within the community on East Warren.

== Recreational space ==
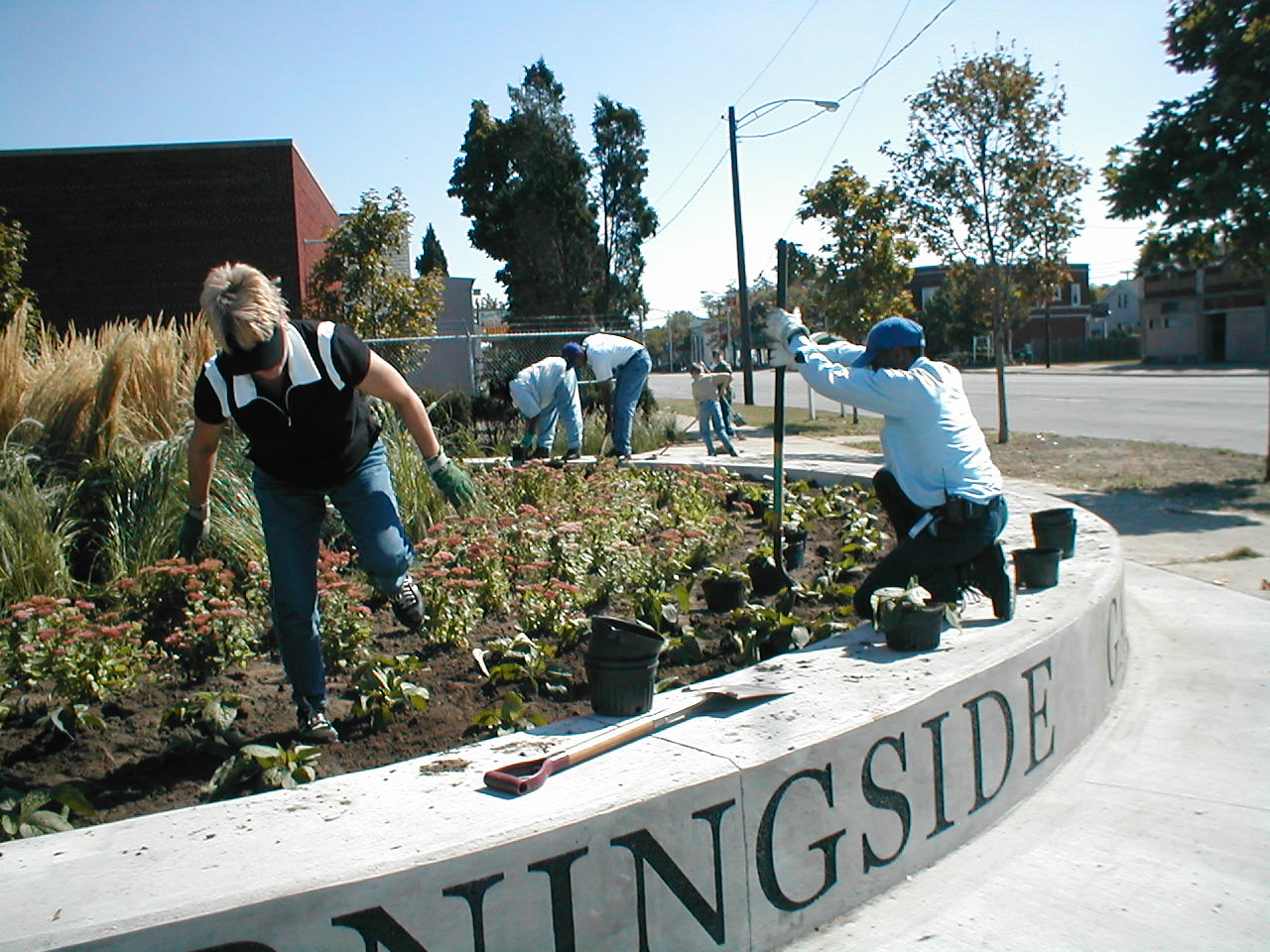
The Morningside Gateway Park being built by volunteers

MorningSide has three parks within its borders. Morningside Gateway Park is a green space park that was donated to the community by DTE and is located on the corner of Mack Ave and Alter Rd. U-SNAP-BAC also has a park in the community called Morningside Commons Park, located on Wayburn, which serves as a play area for children. The third park is Munich Three Mile Park which is more of a family space; its space uses approximately three parcels on each of the four corners of Three Mile Drive and Munich Road. It has a gazebo style picnic area on the Northwest corner, a children's playground on the Southwest side and picnic tables on the Northeast corner as well.

== Community organizations ==
Morningside, established in 1977, is a non-profit community organization where the elected board works with community members to make Morningside a better place. Through the mechanisms of block clubs and monthly meetings they keep residents informed and connected. They promote community involvement in dealing with issues such as clean-up efforts, energy saving and keeping the community safe. In the past they have participated in the Morningside parade down East Warren and hosted a youth basketball league. In 2009 Morningside was one of nine community-based organizations selected from a pool of over forty applicants to receive a Community and Property Preservation (CAPP) program, which is funded by The Kresge Foundation. They used the $4950 to fund four projects: Lawn Maintenance, Mural Painting, Residential Board-Up and Trash Removal. The association's president, Kelley Marks, was featured in the Model D Media report "37 Minutes in Morningside with Kelley Marks". In October 2010, Morningside was awarded the Moe (Most Outstanding Neighborhood on the Eastside) Better Neighborhood Group award from the Warren/Conner Development Coalition.

United Streets Networking and Planning: Building a Community (U-SNAP-BAC) is a consortium of two corporations that was formed in 1987 by a conglomeration of other community groups. The organization operates education programs for first-time purchasers of residential property, oversees funding for house repairs, works with the community board and Habitat for Humanity to construct new houses, and sponsors a community garden.

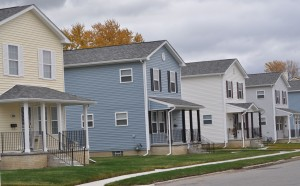
Newly constructed homes in Morningside

Habitat for Humanity's activity in Morningside began in 2006, offering financial literacy initiatives and workshops as well as residential construction. The organization's volunteers in the neighborhood perform more than construction; weatherization, rehabilitation of vacant or foreclosed houses, and other maintenance services are also offered.

Community businesses operate the CEM Business Association, which also serves the areas of Cornerstone Village and East English Village. The association concentrates on maintenance of the East Warren business district and surrounding blocks, using efforts ranging from the provision of business loans to the hiring of a street-sweeping team.

== Community partnerships ==
In 2009, members of the Morningside Community along with high school and middle school students volunteered their time to create murals to cover the doors and windows of vacant homes in the community of Morningside. This was part of an effort to preserve and maintain the community, which included mowing lawns and cleaning up areas around abandoned homes. The Mural Project was successful in improving the appearance of over a dozen homes in the area and was featured on Detroit's radio station WJR. The project was a way to encourage involvement in preserving a community that has been physically affected by foreclosures and was funded by a grant from the Collin Hubbel Fund.

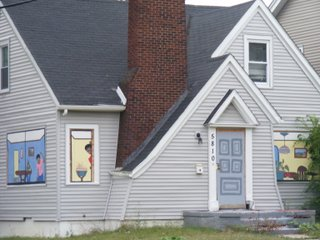
Morningside Mural Project

In 2010, the Morningside Community has been the main focus of the Detroit Sun Project, which is run by graduate students from the University of Michigan's School of Natural Resources and Environment and Taubman College of Architecture and Urban Planning. Their main goal and focus has revolved around economic, environmental and social sustainability as the project seeks new ways to further prevent urban decline. Citizen participation has been promoted by the project as they are open to hearing new ideas from members living in the community who have first-hand experience dealing with urban decay. The Detroit Sun Project's primary initiatives have included things such as blight removal, environmental and public health, and water efficiency and management. These types of initiatives are meant to directly benefit residents of the Morningside Community through economic savings and a cleaner living environment.

In early November 2009, the Detroit Sun Project and Wayne County Department of Environment C.L.E.A.N. Program teamed up for clean-up effort in an area of Morningside that has been hit hard by abandonment, foreclosures and illegal garbage dumping. The effort exemplified the commitments made by both the Detroit Sun Project, members of MorningSide and community residents to improving their neighborhood.

Morningside also has a partnership with the University of Michigan-Dearborn's Urban and Regional Studies Program. In the 2010 fall semester, the program's senior capstone research class worked with Morningside on an action research project. Action research provides a vehicle for community members and volunteers to address issues that arise as a part of their work, allowing for the productivity of their organization or program to increase. The vehicle is a "systematic approach" that searches for a resolutions that are tailored to the local issues, rather than generalized to fit a broad perspective Part of the project has manifested itself as this page. An analysis of the organizational structure based on Fisher's (1994) three dominant historical approaches to neighborhood organizing has demonstrated that Morningside is a community organization that functions primarily as a neighborhood maintenance group that also draws attention from public officials.

MorningSide residents have also benefited from services provided in their community by the Detroit Office of Foreclosure Prevention and Response (FPR). Although the program does not directly provide mortgage services to residents, they provide informational resources to new and existing homeowners who are dealing with issues such as foreclosures and taxes. They do this by sharing tools, resources and recommendations to partners and organizations such as Morningside in the city of Detroit to reduce foreclosures in the area. Resources such as educational classes are also provided by the organizations for residents looking to purchase their first home and also for residents who are seeking to refinance and save their existing home. The organization also directs residents in need of legal services and prevention counseling when dealing with their homes. Morningside and U-Snap-Bac have hosted events to educate community members on their legal options.

== Notable residents ==
- Scotty Boman
