= Detroit Board of Police Commissioners =

American civilian oversight agency

Board of Police Commissioners
Board overview
- Formed: 1974
- Headquarters: Detroit Public Safety Headquarters, Detroit, Michigan, United States
- Board executives: Robert Jones, Chair; Beverly J. Watts, Vice-Chair
- Parent Board: Government of Detroit
- Child Board: Detroit Police Department
- Website: www.detroitmi.gov/Boards/BoardOfPoliceCommissioners

The Detroit Board of Police Commissioners is the civilian oversight organization of the Detroit Police Department. The current 11-member board has broad supervisory authority over the department.

== History ==
The Detroit City Charter was enacted in 1865, and the Michigan Legislature allowed for a commission of four members to be appointed by the Governor to oversee the Detroit Police Department for eight-year terms. Since 1974, the Detroit Police Commission has been charged with police department oversight regarding policy and rules, budget approval, officer discipline and citizen complaints.

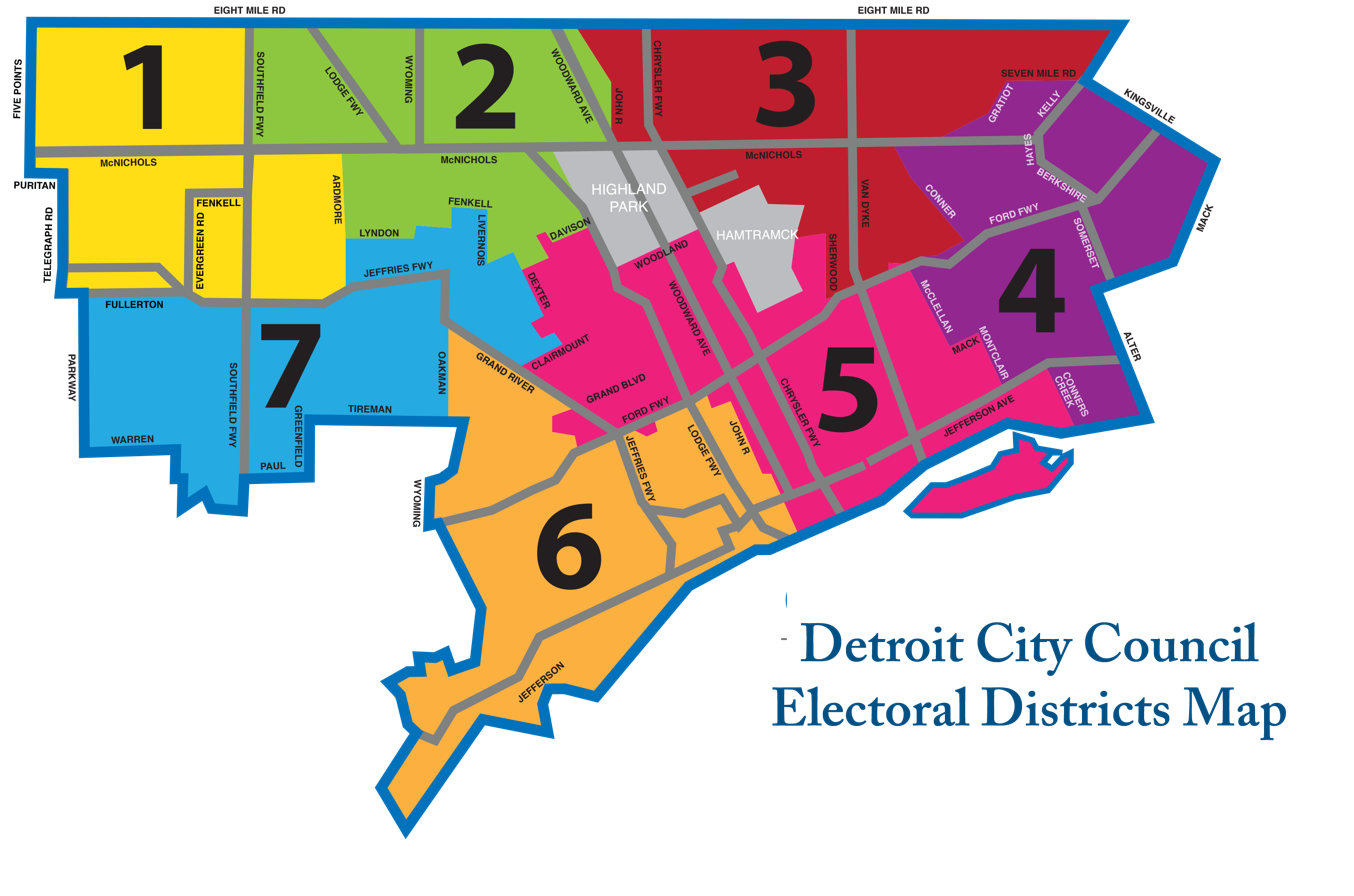
Detroit Electoral Districts Map

The current charter was enacted in 2012 by a vote of Detroit residents. The body lost its power when the city became bankrupt in 2013, when Emergency Manager Kevyn Orr executed Executive Order 11. This authority was restored by a vote of the Detroit City Council in September 2015.

== Composition and authority ==
Board of Police Commissioners has 11 members, seven are elected from each Police Commission District and four are appointed by the Mayor.

=== Current members ===
District	Commissioner	Position	In office since
District 1	Henrietta Ivey		2026
District 2	Lavish T. Williams		2026
District 3	Darious Morris		2026
District 4	Scott Boman		2026
District 5	Beverly J. Watts	Vice-Chair	2026
District 6	Lisa Carter		2014
District 7	Victoria Camille		2026
Appointed	Robert Jones	Chair	2025
Appointed	Eva Garza Dewaelsche		2023
Appointed	Darryl Woods		2024
Appointed	vacant		

== Districts ==
Police Commissioner districts have identical boundaries to the City Council districts. Each commissioner serves a four-year term.

== Controversy ==
=== Open Meetings Act ===
Members and non-members have criticized the commission for alleged violations of the Michigan Open Meetings Act. On April 4, 2019, Robert Davis brought suit against the board alleging that they had been meeting privately with upper-tier members of the Detroit Police Department regarding personnel and business contracts. In response, Wayne County Circuit Court Judge Daniel Hathaway ordered then Chairman Willie Bell to a show cause hearing because the judge was considering a temporary restraining order against the board.

At the April 11, 2019, board meeting, Fifth District Commissioner Willie Burton moved to open all committee meetings to the public. This was the third meeting at which he had made the motion, and it failed to be seconded.

On October 14, Detroit’s Office of the Inspector General found that the Board of Police Commissioners had abused its authority by delegating hiring power to its secretary, Gregory Hicks. The Inspector General initiated the investigation after receiving a complaint on November 14 2019. The investigation concluded that the commission abused its authority in 2016 by delegating its charter-mandated authority to Hicks, which the report said caused violations of the Michigan Open Meetings Act afterwards.

=== Facial Recognition Technology Debate ===
The Detroit Board of Police Commissioners received global notoriety after the newly appointed Chair Lisa Carter had Police arrest Commissioner Willie Burton during a meeting. Carter said Burton was arrested for speaking out of turn, while Burton said it was an attempt to silence citizen voices. Many community members had shown up to the meeting to express their disapproval of facial recognition technology. Some of them wore masks in protest.

Facial recognition technology became a matter of local public interest on June 13, 2019, when the board held a meeting to defend a proposed policy on the technology and to hear public comments. They had scheduled a vote on the technology for June 27. The meeting came a year after Detroit agreed to pay surveillance vendor $1 million in order to stream live video to locations where they could monitor it. The Detroit Police had been using the technology for two years at the time of the meeting.

Following the July 11 arrest, Detroit became divided over the technology. At later meetings, the American Civil Liberties Union and other community organizations expressed opposition to use of the technology by law enforcement.

The Board approved a facial recognition technology policy on September 19, 2019, with more restrictions than the police department had originally asked for.

== See also ==
- Government of Detroit, Michigan
- List of mayors of Detroit, Michigan
