= Alger Theater =

- U.S. National Register of Historic Places
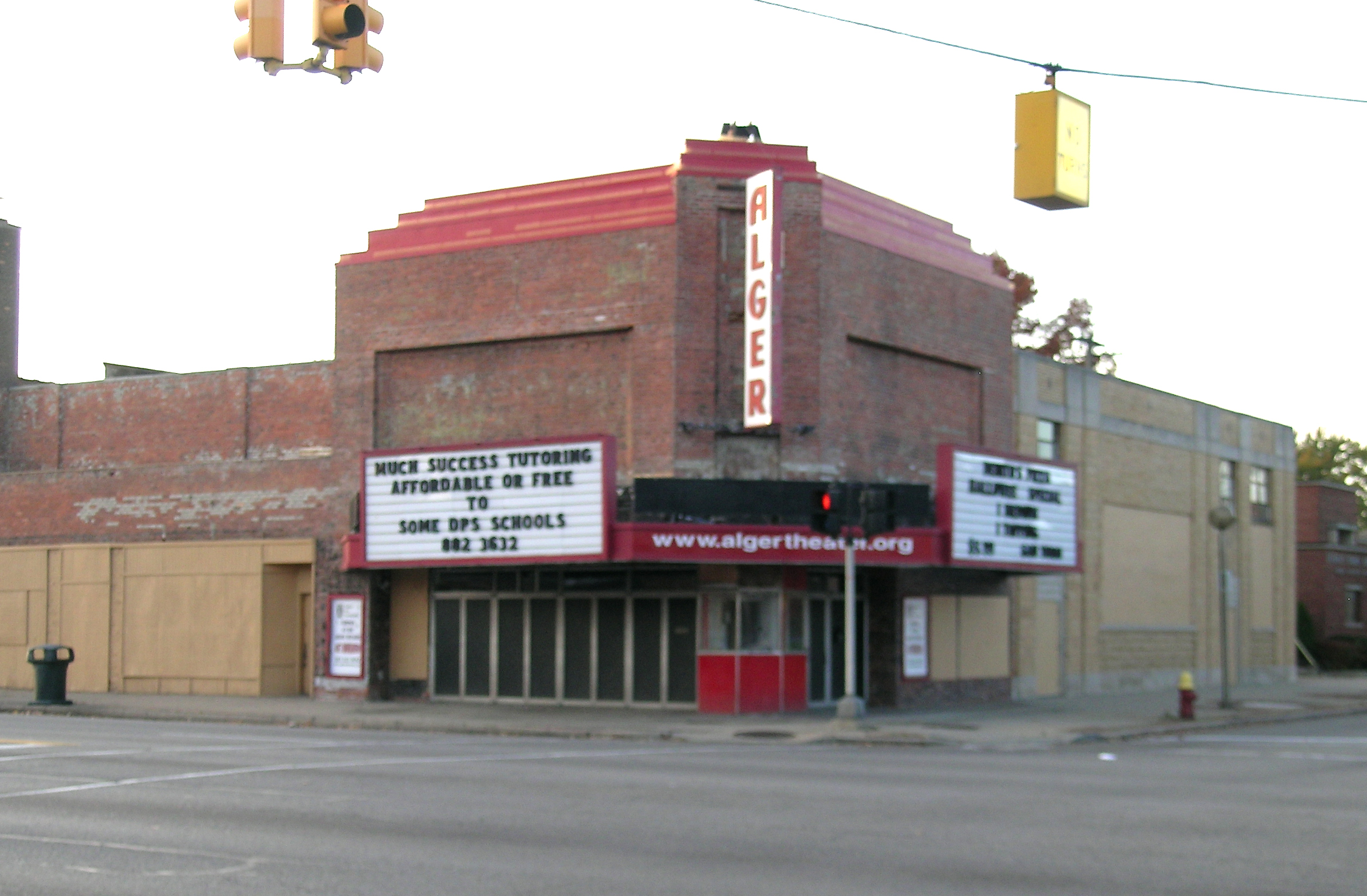
- Interactive map
- Location: 16451 East Warren Avenue; Detroit, Michigan
- Coordinates: 42°24′13″N 82°56′14″W
- Built: 1935
- Architect: Charles Easton Allen
- Architectural style: Art Deco, Art Moderne
- Website: https://www.algertheater.org/
- NRHP reference No.: 05000719
- Added to NRHP: July 22, 2005

The Alger Theater is an historic neighborhood movie theater located at 16451 East Warren Avenue in the Morningside neighborhood of Detroit, Michigan. It is one of only two remaining intact and unchanged neighborhood theaters in the city of Detroit (the second being the Redford Theatre). It was listed on the National Register of Historic Places in 2005.

== History ==
The Alger Theater, presumably named for Michigan governor Russell A. Alger, was built by Detroit theater developers Saul and Hattie Sloan, and designed by architect Charles Easton Allen. The Sloans leased the theater to Detroit theater magnate George Washington Trendle, and it first opened on August 22, 1935. The Alger was equipped with modern amenities such as the latest sound and projection equipment, comfortable seating, and air conditioning. It continued as a movie house for forty years. However, as the surrounding neighborhood suffered socioeconomic changes, attendance began dropping off. In the mid-nineteen seventies, ownership changed hands, and the theater was used for live performances and music in addition to movies. However, the theater closed its doors in 1981. In 1984, ownership changed hands again, and the Alger was re-opened as a B-movie house. However, profits were slim, and the theater closed again in less than a year.

In 1986, the theater was purchased by Friends of the Alger Theater, a nonprofit community-based organization composed of neighborhood residents and businesses dedicated to preserving the Alger Theater. They are developing programming for the community while raising funds to restore and reopen the theater.

== Description ==
The Alger sits at the corner of Warren Avenue and Outer Drive. It is constructed of structural steel faced with brick. A two-story square-plan tower structure with an instepped parapet stands at the corner, dominating the building's facade. The tower houses the theater entrance and box office. A vertical sign with the theater's name extends from the tower toward the street. Along the Warren facade, four single-story commercial spaces faced with painted yellow brick line the sidewalk; the facade of the theater proper above is set back.

On the interior of the theater, the inner and outer lobby and the balcony-less auditorium still show much of their historic finish. The auditorium is constructed of concrete block with horizontal banding in smaller concrete brick; it originally sat 1182 people but now seats 825. The stage was extended into the seating area to provide for theatrical performances. Stepped metal sconces with rounded ends adorn the walls.

== Modern-day use ==
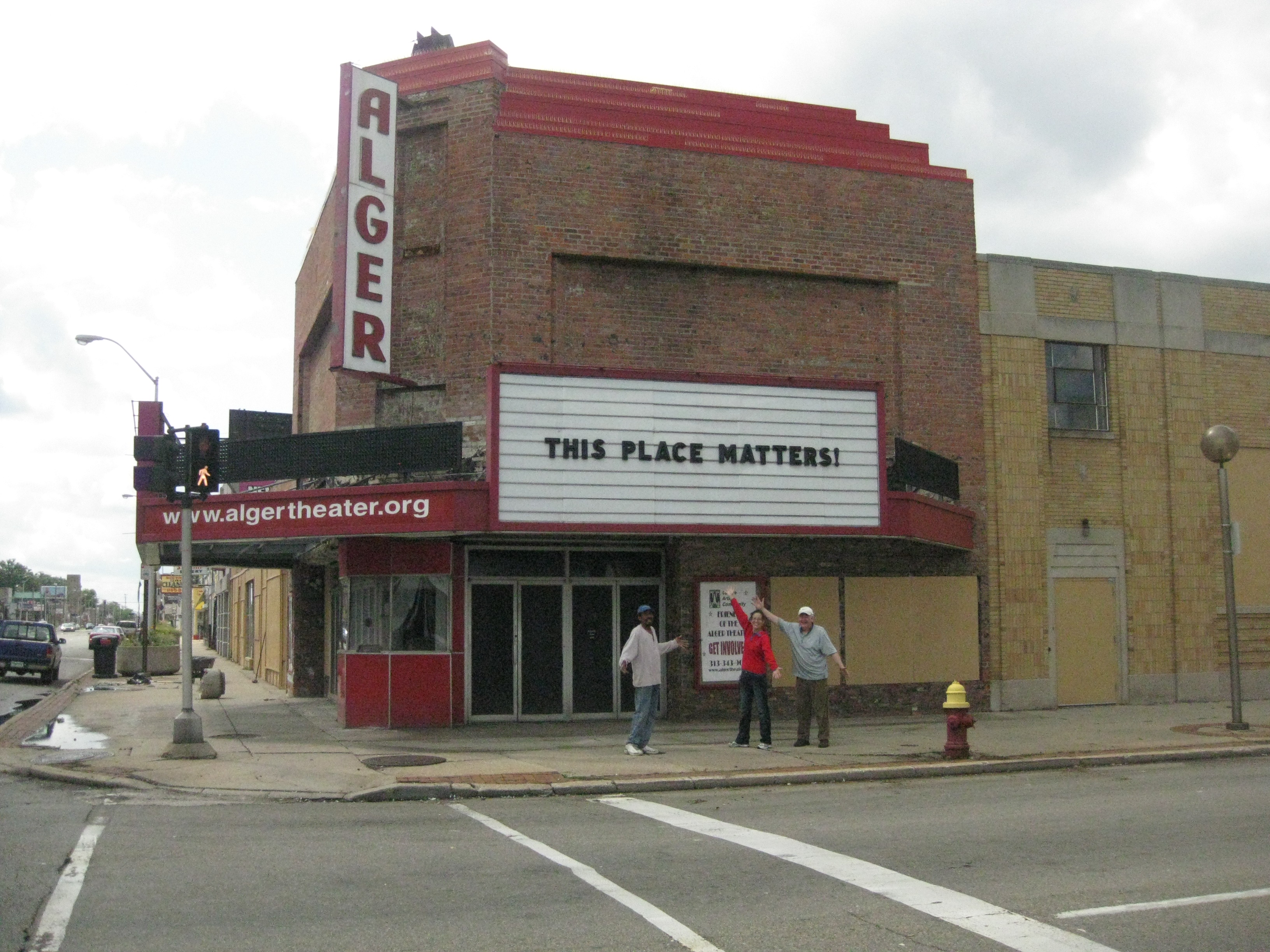
Alger Theater Matters

The Friends of the Alger Theater were awarded historic designations for the theater on the state, federal and local levels. In March 2009, the city's Historic Designation Advisory Board unanimously voted to recommend that the City Council approve the designation. The Detroit City Council approved the formal local historic designation on Oct. 21, 2009. The state and federal designations were granted in 2005.

Over the years The Friends have provided cultural opportunities and worked to build community by offering free programming in the surrounding neighborhoods. These have included theater arts classes at Detroit Public Schools, a neighborhood outdoor movie series, and many others.

In 2014, the theater was surveyed for asbestos and underwent abatement, clearing a large barrier to restoration.

As of 2025, the Alger has a new roof, restored storefronts, a rooftop deck on the East Warren side, an ADA compliant bathroom and an elevator. The group is currently raising funds for full renovation of the theater.

== See also ==
- Theatre in Detroit
