= Libertarian Party of Michigan =

State affiliate of the Libertarian Party

- Chairperson: Tim Teagan
- Vice Chairperson: Scotty Boman
- Secretary: Donna Gundle-Krieg
- Treasurer: Andrew Duke
- Founded: 1972
- Headquarters: Lansing, MI
- Ideology: Libertarianism
- Colors: Gold
- Michigan House of Representatives: 0 / 110
- Michigan Senate: 0 / 38
- Statewide Executive Offices: 0 / 4
- U.S. House of Representatives: 0 / 14
- U.S. Senate: 0 / 2
- Other elected officials: 7 (June 2024)

Website
- michiganlp.org

The Libertarian Party of Michigan is the state affiliate of the Libertarian Party of the United States (LP) for Michigan. Like the national LP, the Libertarian Party of Michigan advocates for libertarian political goals. Several Libertarians have held public office in Michigan—most at the local level. They have also had the only Libertarian member of Congress, Justin Amash.

== History ==
The Libertarian Party of Michigan was founded in 1972. In the mid-1990s, the party had 1,500 dues paying members. The party was down to 800 such members in 2004. The party had a candidate in every congressional race in 2000 but failed to repeat in 2002. For 2004, the party had candidates in all 15 congressional races and 21 state House races.

In 2007, the party joined with the existing third parties to form Michigan Third Parties Coalition lobbying group.

In 2016, Libertarian presidential candidate Gary Johnson won 172,136 votes in Michigan, qualifying the state party for a primary election in 2018. The only contested election on its primary ballot that year was for governor with Grand Rapids businessman Bill Gelineau and retired teacher John Tatar.

In April 2020, U.S. Representative Justin Amash of Michigan's 3rd District joined the Libertarians, becoming the first and so far only member of Congress or federal official representing the party from any state, after leaving the Republican Party in 2019 and spending many months as an independent. He declined to seek reelection under his new affiliation and departed from Congress in 2021.

Shortly after the 2024 Libertarian National Convention, the Michigan delegates challenged the state party's leadership, claiming that the party chair did not have the authority to add Michigan to Region 1 of the convention. In doing so this prevents the Michigan Libertarian Party from authorizing regional agreements and voting on regional representatives. Libertarian National Committee Secretary Caryn Ann Harlos stated that the Michigan chair has the authority to join the Region, and requested that the delegates appeal the decision to the Libertarian Party’s Judicial Committee if they wish to contest it further.

In February 2026, Anthony Hudson, a Genesee County truck driver who had been seeking the Republican nomination for governor, left the Republican Party and joined the Libertarian Party to continue his campaign. The party nominated Hudson as its candidate in the 2026 Michigan gubernatorial election on June 28, 2026, with businessman Beau Parmenter as his running mate for lieutenant governor. The convention also nominated Jason Dye as the party's candidate in the 2026 Michigan Attorney General election.

== Libertarians in public office ==
=== Elected libertarians currently in public office ===
- Andrew LeCureaux—Hazel Park City Councilman
- Bruce Gosling—Glen Oaks Community College Board of Trustees Treasurer (elected in a non-partisan election in 2003 and has remained in office as of January 2017) He was the board's Chairperson as of 2021.
- Scotty Boman—Detroit Police commissioner for District 4

=== Libertarians elected under a different party affiliation ===
- Justin Amash—Representative from Michigan's 3rd congressional district; elected as a Republican.

=== Former elected libertarians ===
- Donna Gundle-Krieg—Mancelona Township Board of Trustees
- Scotty Boman—Detroit Community Advisory Chairperson for District 4
- Gregory Creswell – Detroit Community Advisory Council District 4.
- Mark Byrne – Port Huron Councilman, who is now active with the Unifour Area Libertarian Party in North Carolina.
- Tom Bagwell – Ypsilanti Township Park Commissioner (elected in 2008 on a partisan ballot)
- Bill Bradley – South Haven City Councilman
- Elizabeth Corder – Ypsilanti Township Park Commissioner (elected in 2016 on a partisan ballot)
- Fred Collins – Councilman for the City of Berkley, Michigan from 1997 until he gave up his position to run for Mayor in 2005, and lost the election.
- Rev. James W. Clifton City Councilman from the town of Addison; became the first Michigan Libertarian to win public office in a partisan race.
- David Eisenbacher – Troy City Councilman to office.
- Lawrence W. Johnson – Ypsilanti Township Park Commissioner (elected in 2008 on a partisan ballot)
- Erwin Haas – City of Kentwood 2nd Ward Commissioner
- Erin Stahl – Mayor Pro Tem of St. Clair Shores,

=== Libertarians appointed to public office ===
- Lloyd Sherman (died 2006) – Hazel Park Brownfield Authority, Hazel Park Facilities and Infrastructure Citizens Advisory Board, Hazel Park Fence Review Board, Hazel Park Zoning Board of Appeals, Hazel Park General Building Authority.
- Will Tyler White – Vice-Chair, Meridian Charter Township Economic Development Corporation
- Mike Saliba – Clinton Township Historical Commission

== Ballot access ==
The party, a member of the Michigan Third Parties Coalition, advocates for changes in Michigan's election laws that allow for greater third party representation in the state. In 2012 it attempted to make one such change in the Sixth Circuit case of Libertarian Party of Michigan v Ruth Johnson, 12-2153. The law barring a presidential candidate from running in the general election after losing in the primary for another political party was found to be constitutional.

The party gained primary ballot access status in 2016 due to the vote total of presidential nominee Gary Johnson; however, this was lost after 2018 gubernatorial nominee Bill Gelineau failed to reach the required threshold in the general election.

== See also ==
- List of state Libertarian Parties in the United States
