= Scott Boman =

American politician

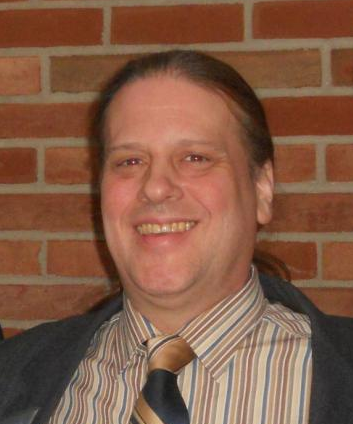

Chairperson of Detroit District 4 Community Advisory Council
- In office January 1, 2021 – January 1, 2022

Member of Detroit District 4 Community Advisory Council
- In office January 1, 2023 – January 1, 2026

Member of Detroit Board of Zoning Appeals (At-large)
- Incumbent
- Assumed office February, 2024

Member of Detroit Board of Police Commissioners (District 4)
- Incumbent
- Assumed office January 1, 2026
- Preceded by: Willie Bell

Personal details
- Born: April 14, 1962 (age 64) Detroit, Michigan, U.S.
- Citizenship: United States
- Party: Libertarian
- Education: BS, MA and MAT. Physics, Philosophy, and Math
- Alma mater: WMU and WSU
- Occupation: Physics professor at Wayne County Community College and Astronomy professor at Macomb Community College
- Known for: Politician, activist, writer, musician
- Website: scottyboman.org

Scott Avery Boman (born April 14, 1962) is an American Libertarian politician from Michigan. He has consistently earned among the top votes of any third-party candidate in every Michigan election from 2000 through 2018. He was chair of the Libertarian Party of Michigan in 2006. Described by MIRS as a Libertarian Party standard-bearer, (Note: Michigan Information and Research Service (MIRS) is an established subscriber-only news service. Non-subscribers may search to verify headlines and summaries. Those seeking to verify complete content may apply for a trial subscription at the MIRS website") he has been a candidate in every state-wide partisan election since 1994, until successfully running for the Detroit office of Community Advisory Council (district 4) in 2020.

He became the second Libertarian to be endorsed by The Detroit News when he competed in the 1997 Detroit City Council general election on the non-partisan ballot. He was also the only Lieutenant Governor candidate to support the successful Michigan Civil Rights Initiative as the running mate of Gregory Creswell in the 2006 Michigan gubernatorial election.

Boman moved the Libertarian Party of Michigan from fifth to third place on the 2012 and 2014 general election ballots, by placing third in the 2010 general election when he ran for Secretary of State. In 2019 he created a Community Advisory Council for Detroit

He was the Michigan Director of Our America Initiative from 2015 through 2019, and served as Michigan Director of Gary Johnson's 2016 presidential campaign.

He served on the Community Advisory Council of Detroit's District 4 after being re-elected to it in 2022, until choosing not to seek an additional term in 2025. He has also been on the Detroit Board of Zoning appeals, since February 2024, as its first at-large appointee. He ran successfully for Board of Police Commissioners in 2025, where he continues to serve.

== Early life ==
Boman's parents grew up in Harper Woods Michigan. His father was United Methodist minister Ray Howard Boman. Before joining the ministry Ray Boman was a Wayne County Port Commissioner, as well as being a Democratic politician, and precinct delegate. Scott's mother was artist and educator Sylvia Anna Boman. Scott went to grade school at the Detroit Waldorf School, and graduated from Grosse Pointe South High School in 1980.

He earned a Bachelor of Science in Physics and Philosophy (with a minor in Mathematics) from Western Michigan University in 1985. While a student there, he became a contributing columnist for the Western Herald college newspaper. According to Boman, his columns took on a libertarian viewpoint after he read Capitalism: the Unknown Ideal, by Ayn Rand. He returned to Western Michigan University where he earned his Master of Arts in Physics, and participated in scholarly atomic physics research. His work was published in Physical Review A. In 1999 he earned an MAT in Secondary Education at Wayne State University.

== Political activities prior to 2006 ==
Scott Boman has run for several public offices, and has been elected to leadership positions in a few organizations:

Before running for public office Boman was involved in organizing at the university level. He was the founding President of a student social organization at Western Michigan University called "Fellowship of the Purple Cube" in 1984. The organization also organized a protest in support of students who wished to hold an outlawed street party. Boman also wrote for the Western Herald on this issue and other topics.

Boman began running for public office in 1994 when he ran for 7th District State Representative to the Michigan Legislature. In the same year Boman (along with Emily Salvette and Barb Vozenilek) headed a successful effort to collect 40,700 signatures to restore the Libertarian Party of Michigan's ballot access.

Two years later, in 1996, he pursued a Federal office and ran for the United States House of Representatives 14th District. He received 1,705 votes for 0.9% of the vote. In 1997 Boman became the second Libertarian to be endorsed by The Detroit News, when he ran for member of the Detroit City Council.

He made two unsuccessful attempts to be elected to the Wayne State University Board of Governors. His first attempt was in 1998 Boman received 2.6% of the vote. Then he ran again for the Wayne State University Board of Governors in 2000, earning more votes than any other minor party candidate, in that election, for any office. His vote total was 130,176 (1.9%). This was 46,000 votes more than those cast for the well-known Green Party presidential candidate Ralph Nader, whose vote total was 84,165 votes (but since fewer votes were cast for president Nader had a higher percentage of the vote).

In 1999 Boman was elected to the Wayne State University Student Council.

Boman made two unsuccessful attempts to be elected to the State Board of Education. The first being in 2002 receiving 1.6% of the vote. The second attempt was in 2004

Boman was elected to leadership positions in his party. In 2005 he was Vice Chair of the Libertarian Party of Michigan. The following year, in 2006, he was elected to be Chair of the Libertarian Party of Michigan.

== 2006 Lieutenant Governor campaign positions ==
=== Gubernatorial ticket ===
Boman's presence on the gubernatorial ticket was the topic of an article in the Detroit Free Press. Both gubernatorial candidate Gregory Creswell and Boman participated jointly on radio interviews and in radio commercials.

=== Racial preferences ===
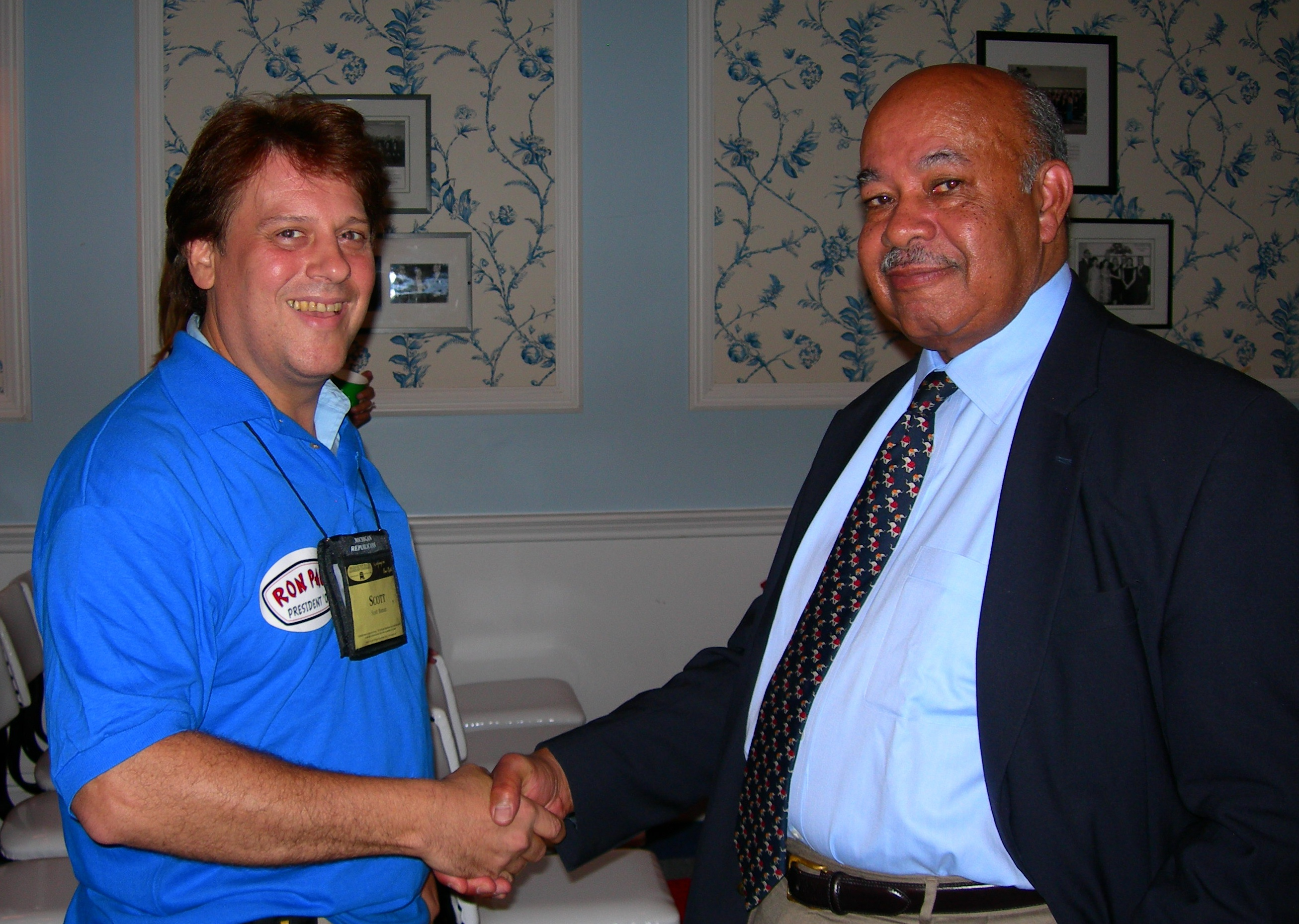
Ward Connerly (right) and Scotty Boman (left)

Like Creswell, Boman said his support of the Michigan Civil Rights Initiative (MCRI) was consistent with his opposition to all forms of state-sponsored racial or sexual discrimination. Both candidates also spoke in radio commercials that contrasted Libertarians from Democrats and Republicans, by supporting an end to what they called, "racial preferences".

=== Civil liberties, prisons and non-violent crime ===
Boman was endorsed by the "Stonewall Libertarians" for openly supporting equal rights for gays. Boman also argued that a respect for civil liberties would eliminate the need for replacing Michigan's single-business tax. Boman's alternative was to save money by pardoning people in prison for what he called "victimless crimes", and an end to state enforcement of drug prohibitions. He focused on medical marijuana as one example of civil liberties worthy of being respected. He was also a member of the American Civil Liberties Union (ACLU), but choose not to renew his membership in 2006 because of the ACLU opposition to MCRI.

=== Economy ===
Boman also supported a market economy. Both he and Creswell referred to the Mackinac Center when asked for specific ideas on practical economic reforms. In general Boman objected to all taxes, but conceded the need to phase them out carefully.

== Republican Party involvement ==
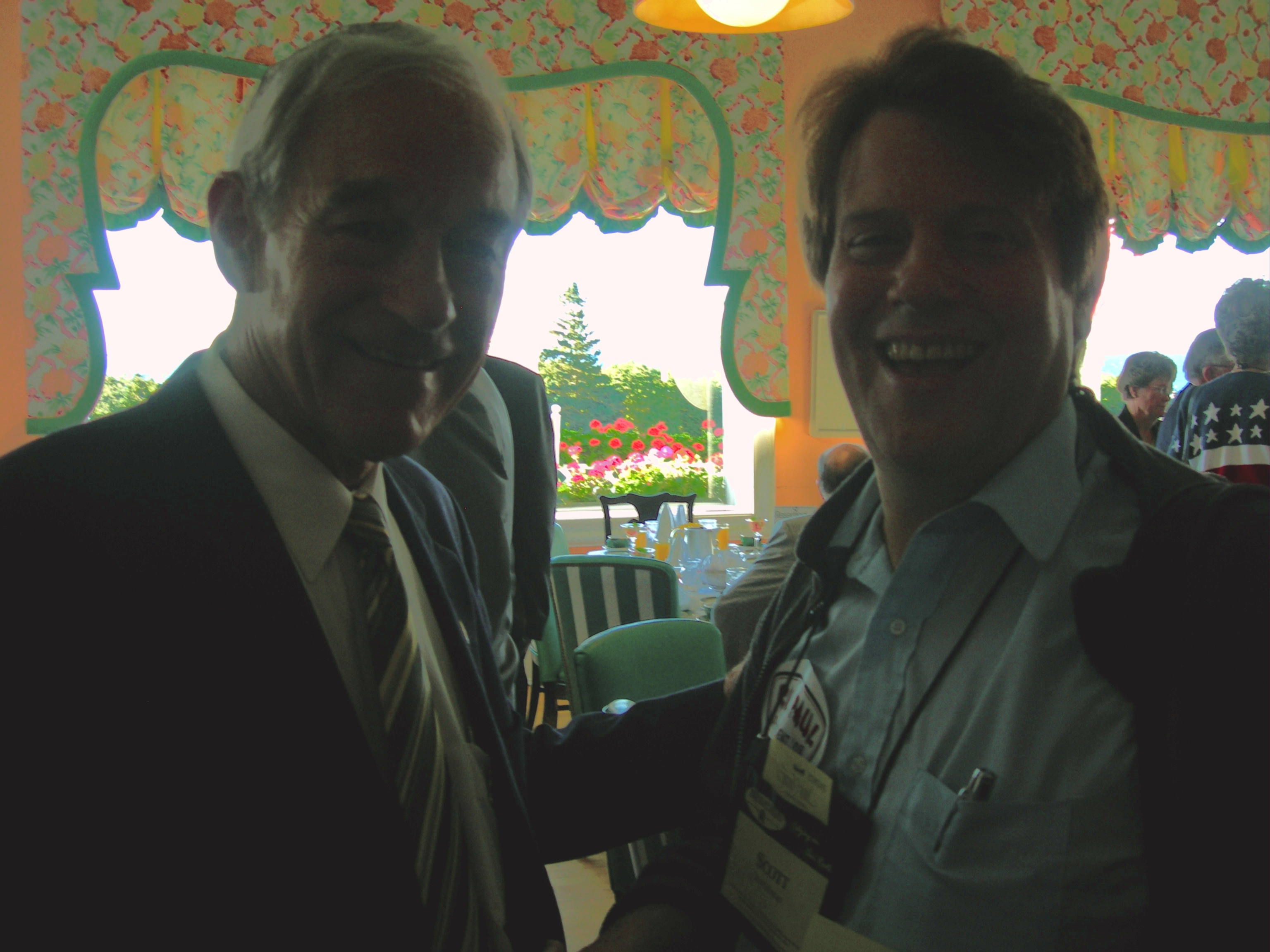
Ron Paul (left) and Scotty Boman (right)

In January, 2008, Boman became a member of the Republican Party. He was interviewed by Detroit's major daily newspaper, The Detroit News about his support of Republican presidential candidate Ron Paul, and cites the Paul candidacy as a reason for becoming a Republican.

Boman also encouraged voters to choose Ron Paul in his opinion column, and has served as an assistant meetup organizer for the Wayne County Ron Paul Meetup Group. In 2012 he was among the four United States Senate candidates (nationwide) identified by Bloomberg Businessweek as having been inspired by Ron Paul, and he was one of two such candidates quoted in Politico:

"I don't think people expected Paul to accomplish so much," said Scotty Boman, a Senate candidate in Michigan who met Paul in 1988 when the Texan was running for president on the Libertarian ticket. "He's been able to break a barrier and be heard by the mainstream."

He was elected precinct delegate in 2010 and 2012. He entered the 2012 United States Senate race as a Republican. While still a declared Republican candidate, he appeared on C-SPAN as a Delegate to the 2012 Libertarian National Convention where he nominated R. Lee Wrights for vice president. Later in May 2012 he returned to the Libertarian Party of Michigan and was nominated as their candidate for United States Senate.

== 2008 US Senate candidacy ==
Boman finished third in an unsuccessful attempt to be elected to Carl Levin's seat in the US Senate, in which he received 1.6% of the vote. His attempt was made under the Libertarian Party of Michigan ticket after winning a contested nomination at their convention over, their 2006 United States Senate nominee, Leonard Schwartz.

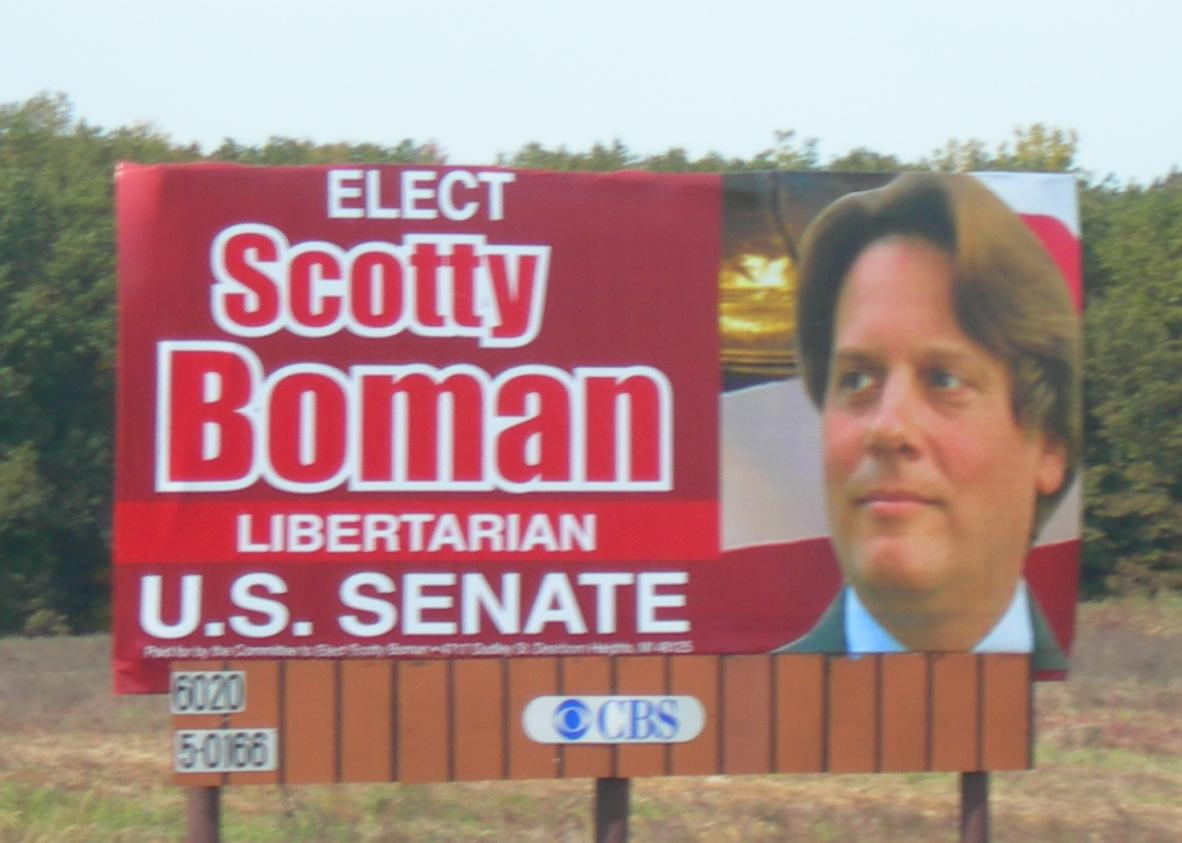
Boman was the only Libertarian in Michigan to use a billboard since the 1990s.

Boman also participated in multipartisan efforts including the formation of the Michigan Third Parties Coalition, and reminded reporters of this at an appearance in Jackson Michigan.

=== Bailout statement ===
Boman joined every Michigan Libertarian candidate for the United States House of Representatives, in publicly expressing disapproval of any federal bailout plan. A Libertarian Party of Michigan press release quoted Boman as saying "We must not tax, regulate and penalize them to bail out those on Wall Street and Main Street who have demonstrated they are not responsible, and will likely do the same thing again, and expect yet another bail out"

== 2010 Secretary of State candidacy ==
In 2010 Boman received the Libertarian Party of Michigan's nomination for Michigan Secretary of State. One of his stated objectives was to use his candidacy to draw attention to state ID modifications and the effect he believed they had on privacy. He lost the election to Ruth Johnson and placed third with 58,044 votes. In Michigan, partisan placement on the ballot is based upon votes received by a party's Secretary of State candidate, so his vote total moved the Libertarian Party from fifth to third place on subsequent Michigan ballot listings.

Boman and his Green Party opponent, John Anthony La Pietra issued a joint statement expressing their concern about what they called "Dangerouse ID". Boman said he would "reject the Real ID Act, Pass Act, or any other attempt to make state documents into de facto national ID cards."

Boman also opposed the driver responsibility fee, taxpayer-funded primaries, and a state Constitutional Convention. He supported no-reason absentee voting, with added security measures.

== 2012 US Senate candidacy ==
Boman was the Libertarian candidate for United States Senate in 2012. He placed third with 84,480 votes; the most votes earned by a third-party United States Senate candidate from Michigan since Libertarian Jon Coon ran for that office in 1994. He was also included in two statewide scientific polls in the post-primary season. The last time a minor party candidate was included in such polls was in 1994. Because of an initial attempt to run as a Republican, Boman was also included in pre-primary polls and placed third, in a field of eight declared Republican Primary candidates. In 2008 Boman was not included in the traditional PBS televised debate due to a lack of poll results, and Boman argued for inclusion in the debate based on a 7% showing in a Poll he had commissioned. Incumbent Senator Debbie Stabenow refused to participate in the forum, shortly after Boman's release and the event was never scheduled. Republican challenger, Pete Hoekstra also refused to debate him after the primary, but Green Party opponent Harley Mikkelson debated Boman on a few occasions.

Boman's 2012 Senatorial campaign was his second attempt to be elected to that office, and was characterized by an emphasis on outreach to Tea Party groups. Between the formation of his exploratory committee and the general election, Boman spoke at several events hosted by tea party groups, and he addressed the tea party directly on his webpage. His 2012 effort also had international reach including an interview on Turkish TV.

=== Chronology of party affiliation and nomination ===
Boman announced his campaign to seek the Republican nomination for United States Senate on Friday, September 9, 2011, in a press release. Several major dailies, as well as some radio and television broadcasters carried the Associated Press originated story. This coverage included, newspapers in other states. He thereby joined a Republican Primary contest in which most of the attention had gone to Cornerstone School founder Clark Durant and former U.S. Rep. Pete Hoekstra.

Boman switched party affiliation twice during has campaign, and drew headlines when he dropped out of the Republican Primary and put his support behind Cornerstone School founder Clark Durant. He later faced Durant at a Tea Party debate in Romeo Michigan as a Libertarian hopeful, saying he would vote for Durant in the Republican Primary, but would oppose the Republican nominee in the general election.

In May 2012, he returned to the Libertarian Party after failing to collect the 15,000 signatures necessary to be on the Republican primary ballot. Boman was nominated to be the United States Senate candidate of Libertarian Party of Michigan at their state convention in Livonia, MI on June 2, 2012. Boman beat out Libertarian activist and continuous party member Erwin Haas, who had built a campaign based around fighting "Party Jumping" and the possibility of the Libertarian Party becoming a dumping ground for Republicans unable to get on the ballot.

=== Notable endorsers ===
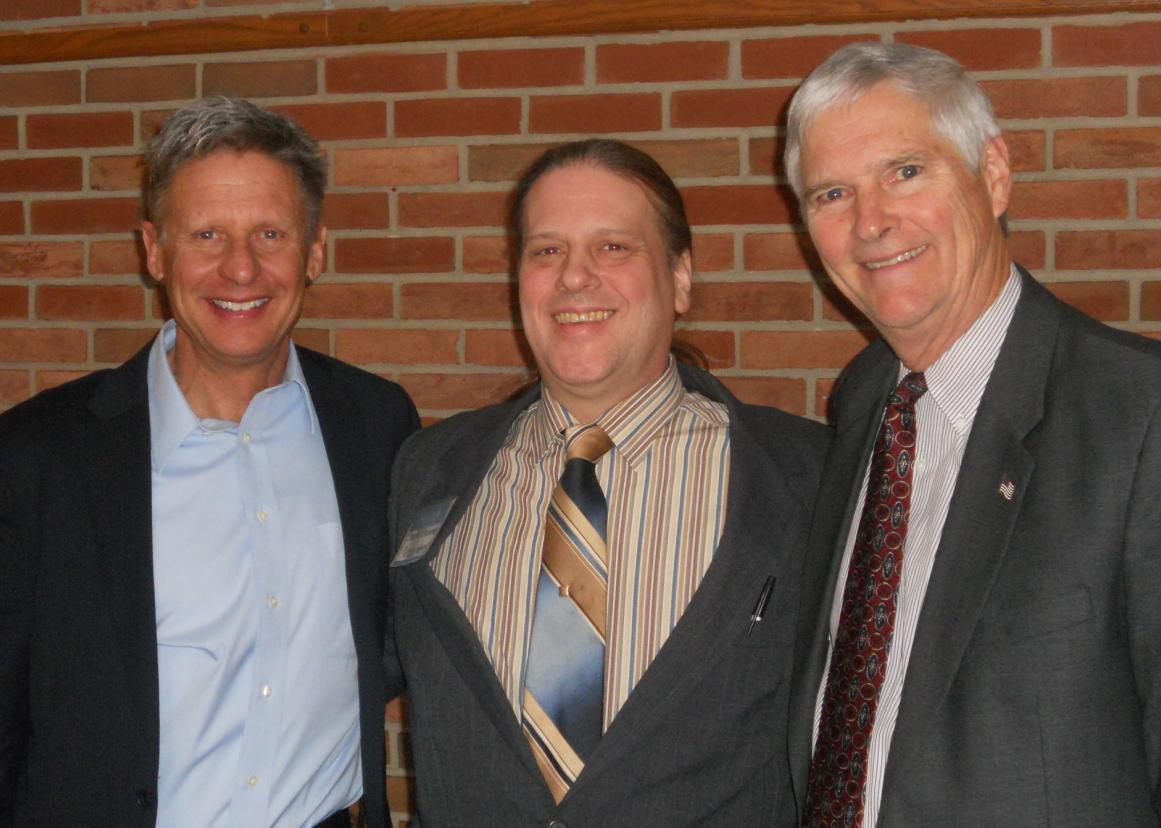
Governor Gary Johnson, Scotty Boman, and Judge James P. Gray (left to right).

- Governor Gary Johnson: Governor of New Mexico from 1995 to 2003; Libertarian Party nominee for President of the United States in 2012 and 2016.
- Judge Jim Gray: Presiding judge of the Superior Court of Orange County, California (1989–2009), and the 2012 Libertarian Party vice presidential nominee.
- Adam Kokesh: American activist, talk show host, and "Iraq Veterans Against the War" activist.
- Mary Ruwart: Research scientist, libertarian speaker, author, and candidate for 2008 Libertarian Party presidential nomination.
- Gregory Creswell: 2006 Libertarian Party of Michigan gubernatorial nominee, and advocate for the Michigan Civil Rights Initiative, an anti-affirmative action ballot initiative.

== Carl Levin recall effort ==
Boman was cosponsor of an unsuccessful effort to recall United States Senator Carl Levin of Michigan. Michigan law states that

Persons holding the office of United States senator are subject to recall by the qualified and registered electors of the state as provided in chapter 36 of this act.

Boman and Warren Raftshol of Suttons Bay Michigan were granted a clarity review hearing with the Wayne County Election Commission on May 1, 2012. While the initial wording was rejected, the recall sponsors were able to use alternative wording and started circulating petitions on July 4, 2012, after Wayne County Election Chair, Milton Mack, refused to schedule a hearing for the revised language. Michigan law provides for such circumstances:

(3) The board of county election commissioners, not less than 10 days or more than 20 days after submission to it of a petition for the recall of an officer, shall meet and shall determine whether each reason for the recall stated in the petition is of sufficient clarity to enable the officer whose recall is sought and the electors to identify the course of conduct that is the basis for the recall. Failure of the board of county election commissioners to comply with this subsection shall constitute a determination that each reason for the recall stated in the petition is of sufficient clarity to enable the officer whose recall is being sought and the electors to identify the course of conduct that is the basis for the recall.

Inside Michigan Politics editor, Bill Ballenger commented on the effort saying "It is unheard of and extremely difficult to recall a congress person. Even if the language was deemed clear and petitions are circulated, it is likely they would be challenged in court." Some analysts dispute the validity of state recall laws as they apply to members of Congress.

The petition language read,

He co-authored and introduced an amendment regarding detention provisions (Subtitle D Section 1031) to S.1867 (the National Defense Authorization Act for Fiscal Year 2012). He voted in favor of the final version (H.R. 1540) which contained the detention provisions in section 1021.

This effort drew the support of People Against the National Defense Act (PANDA), a group of activists opposing the implementation of Indefinite Detention portion of the National Defense Authorization Act for Fiscal Year 2012. PANDA promoted the petition and featured Boman as a sympathetic United States Senate candidate. The effort also drew support from some local Republican groups. In interviews, Boman said the recall effort was partially intended to raise public awareness about indefinite detentions; which he had been speaking out against since the bill was passed by Congress.

While petitioners failed to attain the 468,709 signatures needed, they initially expressed an intention to restart the effort after they reviewed new state recall laws. Plans to restart the effort were cancelled and organizers claimed an effective victory after Levin formally announced that he would not seek another term.

== Community Office ==
Boman was elected to the MorningSide community board in 2013. He was still on the board as an At-Large Member as of November 2016.

He was featured in a WYPR podcast about MorningSide and produced one for National Public Radio.

== 2013 City Clerk candidacy ==
Boman was an unsuccessful candidate for City Clerk in Detroit's August 6 Primary. He submitted 1000 signatures. 500 were required to be on the ballot.

=== Trespassing conviction ===
During the time leading up to a July 30 candidate forum, Boman alleged that he was assaulted, handcuffed, and confined to a closet for between 3.25 and 3.5 hours by Wayne County Community College District police after taking photographs of an opposition candidate's signs (which he believed were made using taxpayer funds) and stopped from handing out campaign materials.

After being detained, he was charged with trespassing. Boman was a professor at Wayne County Community College District, and was in an area that was open to the general public at the time. He believed he was being held for that long to intimidate him from participating in a candidate forum, and said injuries from handcuffs caused him to lose feeling in his hand.

The campus was under video surveillance, but campus police said video recordings of the incident no longer exist, and deny deleting video recorded by Boman. They said Boman's crime was recording students.

On March 11, 2015, 36th District Court Judge Roberta Archer convicted Boman of trespassing in connection with the incident. He appealed the verdict claiming that the prosecution's chief witness, Olivia Moss-Fort, was shown to lie under oath, and that the charge against him didn't match his alleged actions. Circuit Court Judge Cynthia Hathaway heard oral arguments in late August 2015, and a decision was still pending as of September 29. Boman initiated a civil suit while awaiting the appellate ruling.

Appellate Judge Cynthia Grey Hathaway denied the appeal. In support of her opinion she wrote, "Appellant's 4th amendment rights were not violated when he was ordered to cease and desist from taking pictures and video recordings." Having lost the appeal Boman was sentenced to pay a fine of $375. He has stated his intent to continue to pursue a civil action.

== 2014 Lieutenant Governor candidacy ==
Scotty Boman was the 2014 Libertarian Party of Michigan nominee for Lieutenant Governor. He was the running mate of gubernatorial candidate Mary Buzuma. Some polls predicted they would receive 3% percent of the vote while the two frontrunners were in a statistical tie. But in the actual election, Republican Rick Snyder defeated Democrat Mark Schauer with a 4.1% lead, while Buzuma and Boman finished with 1.1% which was the highest vote total for any Libertarian gubernatorial candidate in the history of Michigan.

== 2016 election cycle ==
=== Gary Johnson campaign directorship ===
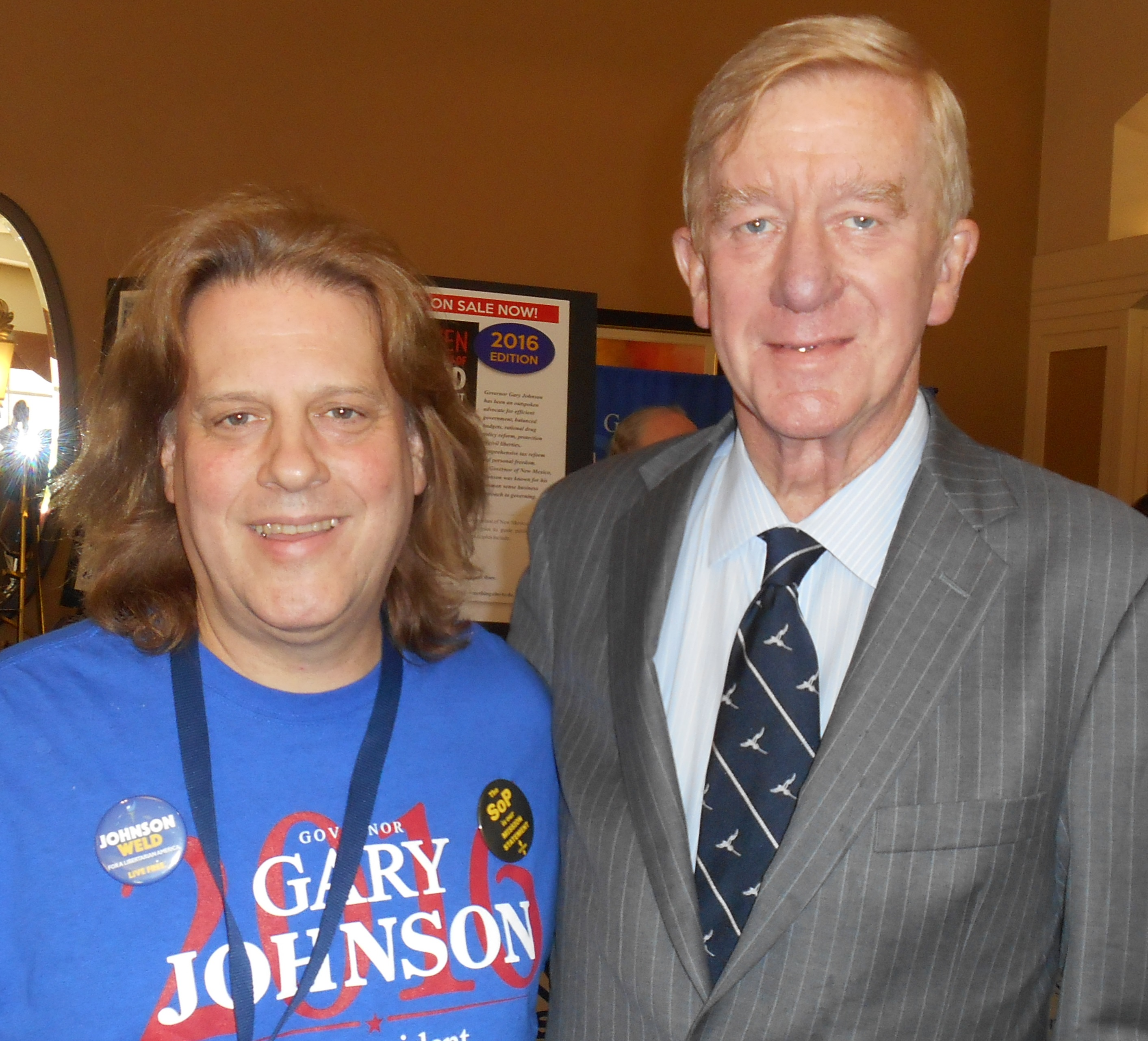
Gary Johnson's 2016 running mate, Governor Bill Weld (Right) and Michigan Johnson–Weld campaign director Scotty Boman (Left).

Scotty Boman was Michigan Director of Gary Johnson's presidential campaign, and served as his surrogate at a candidate forum. Johnson's vote total met a threshold in Michigan election law that qualified the Libertarian Party to have the same ballot access as major parties. This includes participation in primary elections which have previously only included Republicans and Democrats.

According to Boman the campaign relied largely on home-based volunteer phone banks and door-to-door canvassers. He claimed to be recruiting these volunteers from a database of approximately 3,000 contacts. According to The Detroit News, Boman believed Johnson and his running mate, Bill Weld, were more credible then previous Libertarian candidates. He cited their experience as Governors saying, "They've both been vetted by their own experience." The Detroit News, later broke with 143 years of tradition by endorsing the Johnson–Weld presidential ticket, instead of the Republican nominee.

=== Michigan Board of Education candidacy ===
Scotty Boman made his third run for Board of Education and finished with the second highest vote total for a Statewide minor party candidate. He ran on a platform of diversifying curriculum, parental school choice, and ending gun-free school zones for "legally qualified" gun-owners. He also called for abandoning what he called, "Federally subsidized PC fads."

== 2018 Michigan Board of Education candidacy ==
He made his fourth run for the Michigan Board of Education in 2018 and participated in the bipartisan televised debate for that office. The other candidate in the debate was Green Party candidate, Sherri Wells.

== Police Commissioner candidacies ==
=== 2017 Campaign ===
Boman was an unsuccessful candidate for the Fourth District seat on the Detroit Board of Police Commissioners. He lost to incumbent Commissioner Willie Bell with 39% of the vote.

In interviews Boman had emphasized his status as a civilian to contrast himself from the incumbent who is a veteran of the Detroit Police Department. He told one reporter, "I think in order to have true citizen oversight, a commissioner shouldn't have a 30-year relationship with those you're overseeing." Upon being defeated he said he would continue to promote civilian oversight by founding a group called Detroit Residents Advancing Civilian Oversight (D.R.A.C.O.).

=== 2021 Campaign ===
Boman made a second unsuccessful attempt to be elected to the Board of Police Commissioners in 2021. He ran on a reformist platform advocating more limits on surveillance, use of force, and more accountability by abusive police officers. He was endorsed by the Detroit Metro Times. His opponent, Willie Bell, received support from incumbent Mayor Mike Duggan, and Detroit City officials aggressively removed many of Boman's campaign signs from the lawns of his supporters.

=== 2025 Campaign and election ===
In 2025, Boman ran unopposed for the District 4 seat on the Detroit Board of Police Commissioners. His campaign emphasized reducing the backlog of complaints awaiting investigation by the board's Office of the Chief Investigator and ensuring that complaints received thorough review. During the campaign, he also advocated greater public access to police body-camera video, supporting increased transparency while criticizing limitations in a proposed city ordinance addressing the release of such recordings. Boman subsequently won the unopposed election. Reason (magazine) described his election as placing a prominent Libertarian voice in a position concerned with police oversight and departmental accountability.

== Civilian Oversight Group ==
In the years following his 2017 police commissioner run, Boman continued to make televised appearances on behalf of DRACO. He commented on the possible effects of the Detroit Charter revision on the Board of Police Commissioners, and participated in a press conference where he criticized commissioners for not suspending a police officer who had been recorded on surveillance video hitting an emergency room patient.

When the officer, Corporal Dewayne Jones, went on trial, Boman and his group continued to protest the officer's actions. DRACO organized a protest outside the officer's trial supporting a conviction, and they organized another protest outside his sentencing hearing calling for jail time.

Boman spoke on behalf of DRACO again, in January 2020, when Jones requested a new trial, asserting that the appeals were a ploy to keep his pension. In April 2021, after Jones was granted a new trial, Boman objected and called for reinstating felony assault charges against Jones. In January 2022 Boman organized a DRACO news conference as Jones had a pre-trial hearing, ahead of his second trial. Boman said the Detroit Police Department needs to negotiate a contract that allows the Detroit Board of Police Commissioners to deny promotions to officers, and characterized Jones' promotion as an injustice to assault victim, Sheldy Smith.

In 2019 DRACO became one of the groups opposing facial recognition technology. Boman made public statements against the technology at Detroit Board of Police Commissioner meetings, and DRACO organized a protest on July 11, 2019, at which protesters wore masks and one police commissioner was arrested while speaking against the technology. In 2022 he expressed support for the highly restricted use of high-definition police cameras on freeways.

In 2023 Boman criticized the Board of Police Commissioners, extensively, on behalf of DRACO. He cited their delay in filling the Secretary and Chief Investigator posts saying, "Something doesn't smell right when it takes them this many years to fill vacancies. It's as if they wanted to keep Akbar and White in those positions permanently. It never made sense." Lawrence Akbar was serving as Interim Chief Investigator for most of that time, and Melonie White as Board Secretary. Both were suspended while the Auditor General, the Office of the Inspector General and the Detroit Police Department conduct an investigation into allegations of corruption.

In 2024 he expressed concern, on behalf of DRACO, that a gun-fire detection system called "ShotSpotter" could violate individual privacy. He said poor security by contractors would make private communications accessible to unauthorized people. He also objected to the cost of the system.

In 2025, Boman represented DRACO at a rally outside the Detroit Police Officers Association building advocating civilian police oversight. The demonstration was organized by the Coalition for Police Transparency and Accountability, DRACO, Black Lives Matter Detroit, and the Michigan Coalition for Human Rights.

== Community Advisory Council service ==
In 2019 Boman Petitioned successfully to create a Community Advisory Council (CAC) in Detroit's Fourth municipal district. He and two other officers were elected to the office in 2020. As CAC member-elect he spoke at Detroit City Council Meetings on Marijuana retail policies saying, “I think anything that's going to open more businesses and make it easier for people within the city to become involved with this industry is a good thing.”

In 2020 Boman and members of another CAC organized a summit at which they complained that Community Advisory Councils were not being respected like other elected offices by the rest of the government of the City of Detroit. Upon taking office Boman provided input on Detroit's East Warren-Cadieux corridor revitalization plan. He has also condemned District 4 Police Commissioner Willie Bell for muting District 5 Commissioner Willie Burton during teleconferenced meetings.

The CAC faced some challenges. On July 12, 2021, they passed a resolution censuring Fourth District Councilmember André L. Spivey for his failure to carry out legally required appointments. Boman publicly criticized Spivey saying, "He has not been doing his job following the city ordinances as far as community appointments are concerned... It shows a disrespect for the legal process. Up until this disagreement, he had shown integrity."

=== Re-election ===
In 2022 Boman ran in a special election to fill a vacancy on the Community Advisory Council. He was re-elected to the office with 12,818 votes.

In 2025 he decided against seeking reelection to the CAC. He expressed some disappointment saying,

“The biggest thing ... as far as actual community engagement where I'm not happy, is that there are still things popping up where we’re kind of like trying to play catch up with the situation, rather than being consulted early on in the process,...We seem to be a little more in the loop, but we’re not fully in the loop.”

=== Departure from the CAC ===
Boman did not seek reelection to the District 4 Community Advisory Council after serving on the body for a total of four years. Near the end of his tenure, he expressed disappointment that the CAC had not met with the full Detroit City Council or held the annual meetings with the mayor contemplated by the City Charter. He also argued that the council was too often reacting to neighborhood issues after they arose rather than being consulted earlier in the decision-making process.

== 2024 Michigan Board of Education candidacy ==
In 2024 Boman made a fifth attempt to be elected to the Michigan Board of Education. Unlike previous efforts, he ran this time as a public office holder. He emphasized a belief that schools should not be funded by taxation. He received approximately 1.5% of the vote.

== Weekly Radio Show and Issue Advocacy ==
For five years Boman was a regular panelist on the 910 AM Superstation’s Robert Ficano Show. He used the radio show as a platform to advocate libertarian views on issues concerning Metro Detroit.

The show went off the air when WFDF (AM) changed its format by abruptly cancelling all local talk shows on August 11th 2023. The station then deleted all of the videos of shows on Facebook. Boman objected to this action but had previously posted some of the episodes on YouTube and Rumble.

Boman frequently spoke out about was gun control. On May 1st 2023 Boman joined with NRA Board member Rick Ector and Libertarian Party member Ryan Brennan, to protest proposed “gun-free zones,” in downtown Detroit. They were responding to a proposal by members of the Detroit City Council. Boman said criminals would not respect the law and that the proposal violated basic rights . As an alternative he said, “I think it's best to have responsible gun owners who can actually respond and help protect and helps stop active shooters when they start to do harm to others.”

Boman also continued his issue advocacy through opinion writing, publishing an article opposing tariffs on pharmaceutical products and arguing against their use as a trade policy.

== Board of Police Commissioners service ==
During his service on the Detroit Board of Police Commissioners, Boman also continued serving on the city's Board of Zoning Appeals. When questions arose concerning another city official holding positions with both city and county government, Boman defended the general practice of holding multiple public positions, arguing that compensation should be evaluated in relation to the responsibilities and work involved.

Boman was critical of restrictions on the Office of the Chief Investigator's access to police records and body-camera recordings resulting from federal Criminal Justice Information Services (CJIS) requirements. Amid broader debate over cooperation between local police and federal immigration authorities, he argued that effective civilian oversight required the commission to be able to independently verify information provided by the Detroit Police Department, describing his approach as "trust, but verify."

In another incident, after WXYZ-TV showed Boman video appearing to depict a fellow police commissioner refereeing a fight on a Detroit sidewalk, he described the video as concerning but cautioned against reaching conclusions without additional context.

== Notes ==
Party political offices
Preceded by Nathan Allen	Chairman of the Libertarian Party of Michigan; May 2006 – May 2007	Succeeded by Bill Hall
Preceded by Steve Mace	Vice Chairman of the Libertarian Party of Michigan; November 2013 – May 2015	Succeeded by Karl Jackson
Preceded by Jim Miller	Vice Chairman of the Libertarian Party of Michigan; April 2005 – May 2006	Succeeded by James Hudler
Preceded by Gregory Creswell	LEC At-Large Director of the Libertarian Party of Michigan; June 2013 – November 2013	Succeeded by Arnis Davidsons
Preceded by Leonard Schwartz	Political Director of the Libertarian Party of Michigan; May 2015 – July 2017	Succeeded by Gregory Stempfle
