= Flag of Detroit =

City of Detroit
- Use: Civil flag
- Proportion: 3:5
- Adopted: 1948 (last modified in 2000)
- Design: City seal emblazoned on quartered background.
- Designed by: David E. Heineman

The flag of Detroit was designed in 1907 by David E. Heineman and was officially adopted as the city's flag in 1948. Its design has been slightly altered several times in the years since, the most recent in 2000.

== Design ==
Past flags of Detroit

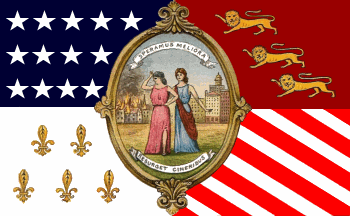
Detroit city flag (1948–1974)

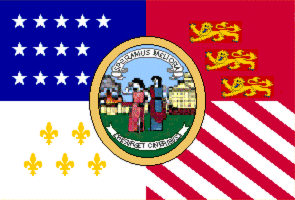
Detroit city flag (1974–1976)

Detroit city flag (1976–2000)

The flag has the city seal emblazoned on quartered background, with each section representing a country that once controlled Detroit. The lower hoist (left) quarter represents France, which founded the fort and settlement in 1701; it has five gold fleurs-de-lis on a white field, imitating the Royal Standard of France. The upper fly (right) quarter represents Great Britain, which controlled the fort from 1760 to 1796; it has three gold lions on a red field, imitating the Royal Arms of England. The lower fly has 13 red and white stripes and the upper hoist has 13 white stars on a blue field, representing the original Thirteen Colonies of the United States.

== Symbolism ==
The two Latin mottos read Speramus Meliora and Resurget Cineribus, meaning "We hope for better things" and "It will rise from the ashes", which was written by Gabriel Richard after the Great Fire of 1805. The seal is a representation of the Detroit fire which occurred on June 11, 1805. The fire caused the entire city to burn with only one building saved from the flames. The figure on the left weeps over the destruction while the figure on the right gestures to the new city that will rise in its place.

== History ==
In the original design of the flag, the seal was oval. In the early 1970s, the flag was redesigned and the seal was changed to a circle. In 1976, the colors were standardized using the Pantone Matching System, and in approximately 2000, the seal was again changed to reduce the number of colors.

== See also ==
- Flag of Michigan
