= Flag of Michigan =

U.S. state flag

State of Michigan
- Use: Civil and state flag
- Proportion: 2:3
- Adopted: August 1, 1911; 115 years ago
- Design: A state coat of arms on a blue field.
- Designed by: Caroline Campbell
- Flag of the governor of Michigan
- Use: Flag of the governor of Michigan
- Adopted: August 1, 1911; 115 years ago
- Design: Coat of arms of Michigan on a white field

The flag of the U.S. state of Michigan is a coat of arms set on a dark blue field, as set forth by Michigan state law. As of 2025 Michigan has had three state flags, and the current flag was adopted on August 1, 1911. The governor has a variant of the flag with a white field instead of blue one. The state has an official flag month from June 14 through July 14.

== Statute ==
The 2010 Michigan Compiled Laws, Chapter 2, Act 209 of 1911, § 2.23 defines that the state flag shall be:

blue, charged with the arms of the state.

=== Design of the coat of arms ===
Michigan Compiled Laws § 2.22 (2024) defines the blazon of the state coat of arms as follows:

Chief: Azure, motto argent Tuebor

Charge: Azure, sun-rayed rising sinister proper, lake wavey proper, peninsula dexter grassy proper, man dexter on peninsula, rustic, habited, dexter arm-raised, dexter turned, sinister arm with gun stock resting, all proper

Crest: On a wreath azure and or, an American eagle rising to the dexter, tips of wings partly lowered to base, all proper, dexter talon holding an olive branch with 13 fruit, sinister talon holding a sheaf of 3 arrows, all proper. Over his head a sky azure environed with a scroll gules with the motto "E Pluribus Unum" argent

An elk and a moose are defined as supporters, positioned on the right (dexter) and left (sinister) of the shield. Two scrolls display the state mottos: the upper narrow scroll reads "Si quaeris peninsulam amoenam" and the lower broad scroll reads "Circumspice." The shield rests on gold-colored scroll supports and a leaf design, which also supports the upper scroll.

== Design and symbolism ==
The state coat of arms depicts a blue shield, upon which the sun rises over a lake and peninsula, and a man with a raised hand, representing peace and holding a long gun, representing the fight for state and nation as a frontier state. The blue field reflects Michigan's historical military tradition, continuing the Union regimental blue used during the American Civil War, symbolizing the state's loyalty to the Union.

As supporters, the elk and moose are derived from the Hudson's Bay Company coat of arms, and depict great animals of Michigan, chosen for their connection to Michigan's historical rivalry with Britain for influence among Native American tribes and the fur trade. The bald eagle represents the United States, which formed the state of Michigan from the Northwest Territory, and holds 13 olive branches and 13 arrows representing the original colonies and the readiness to defend the nation.

The design features three Latin mottos. From top-to-bottom they are:

1. On red ribbon: E Pluribus Unum ('Out of many, one'), a motto of the United States.
2. On light blue shield: Tuebor ('I will defend'), reflecting Michigan's frontier position and historical conflicts such as the War of 1812 and ongoing tensions with British Canada.
3. On white ribbon: Si Quæris Peninsulam Amœnam Circumspice ('If you seek a pleasant peninsula, look about you'), the official state motto, which came to include the full Upper Peninsula after the Toledo War resolution.

The Michigan flag is one of nine U.S. state flags to feature an eagle, alongside those of Illinois, Iowa, Missouri, New York, North Dakota, Oregon, Pennsylvania and Wyoming.

== History ==
=== The Brady Flag ===
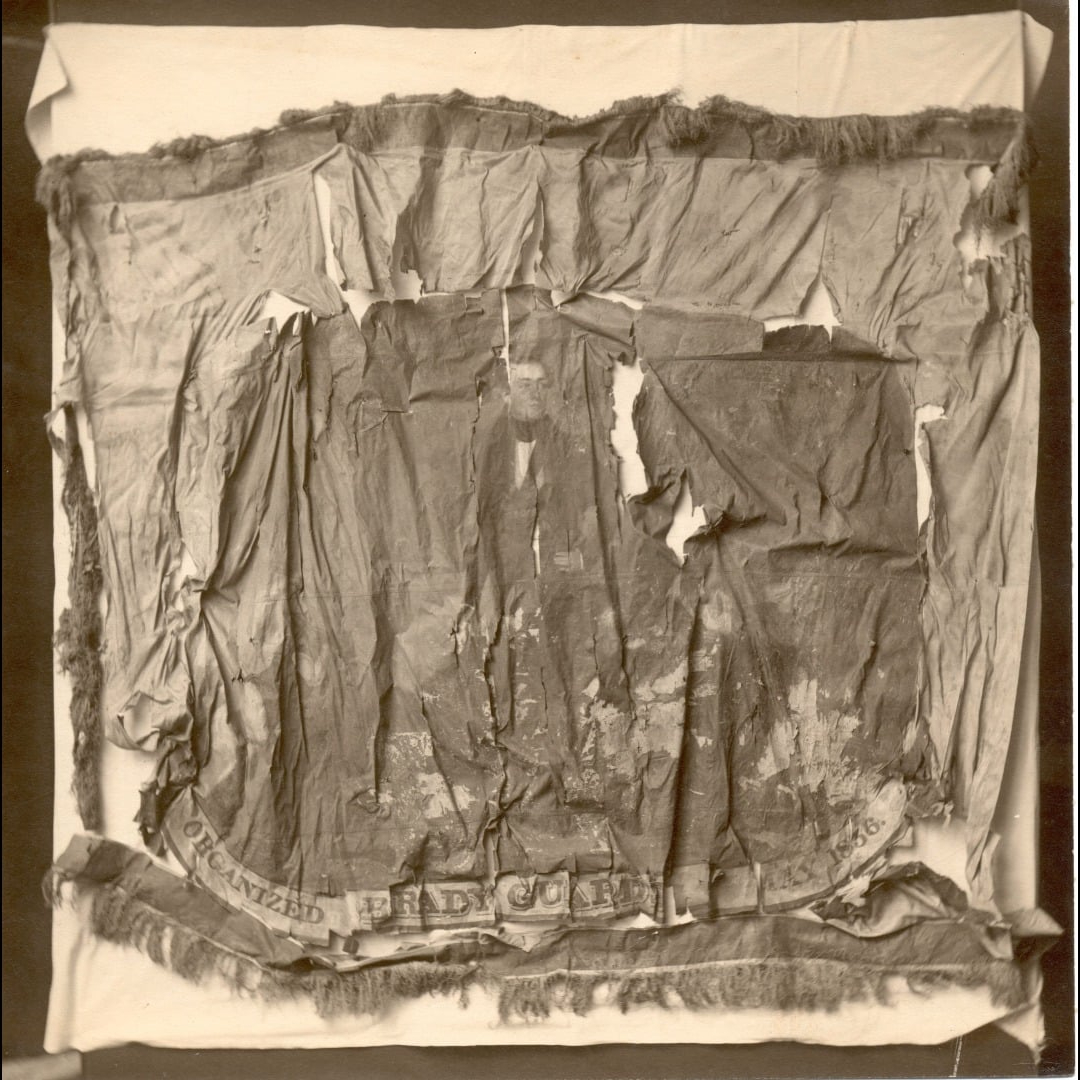
A photograph of the flag

Recreation of the Brady Flag (obverse)

Recreation of the Brady Flag (reverse)

Though not an officially commissioned state flag, it was commissioned for the Brady Guard in 1837, shortly after Michigan attained statehood. In addition to being the Brady Guard's standard, the flag was also described as the state flag and the governor's flag. On February 22, 1837, a special ceremony was held in Detroit where Governor Mason presented the flag to the Brady Guard. The governor called the flag a "token of my regard ... I am confident it will never meet dishonor whether in the calm of peace or amid the storm of war."

The flag was made by prominent Detroit artist, Alvin Smith. The flag was made from white silk and included the coat of arms, flanked by the figures of a woman (representing the allegory of Michigan) and a soldier holding a flintlock musket at attention. Below the coat of arms the banner reads "PRESENTED BY STEVENS MASON FEBRUARY 1837." The reverse side showed a portrait of Michigan's first governor Stevens T. Mason with his horse behind him. Below the portrait of the governor was a banner reading "ORGANIZED BRADY GUARD MAY 1836."

The flag was used in 1861 by Company A of the 1st Michigan Infantry Regiment during the Civil War. In 1877, the Michigan adjutant general John Robinson mentioned in his book The Flags of Michigan that the flag was in the state's possession.

The flag had been missing for a long time since its last use, and it was thought that all information about the flag was lost. However, in 1912, the flag was rediscovered in the basement of the Michigan State Capitol building. It was found in a general's office wrapped in a dusty package in the back of a filing cabinet. The flag was discovered by Caroline Campbell, the wife of a Michigan state senator. She was a known historian of the Civil War and of early Michigan history. The flag upon discovery was in very poor condition. The flag was made of fine silk, and due to being tightly rolled and bound in a package for years, the folds in the fabric had hardened, which would have severely torn the flag if unfurled. The flag was sent to the Kent Scientific Museum in Grand Rapids with special permission to restore the flag. Due to textile conservation being in its infancy during this time, the flag had received several tears. The oil treatment used to clean the flag was more successful, and restored its original colors. Later in 1912, the flag was put on permanent display in the ground floor rotunda of the state capitol. It was pressed between two pieces of glass and placed upright so that both sides could be viewed.

On January 19, 1931, a fire broke out at a news stand on the ground floor of the state capitol. The fire destroyed the flag beyond repair. In 2002, a Michigan man who was trying to get a historical marker for his home had sent a box to his son who was a Michigan politician. In the box was an envelope that contained two photographs of the flag as well as a small fragment of the flag. The two photographs are the only known photographs of the flag, and the small fragment is the only remaining piece of the flag. As of 2021 the flag fragment is being held in the state capitol.

=== The 1865–1911 flag ===
Recreation of the 1865–1911 flag of Michigan (obverse)

Recreation of the 1865–1911 flag of Michigan (reverse)

The second flag was adopted in 1865 after it had been proposed by Adjutant-General John Robertson and authorized by Governor Crapo. Its design consisted of Michigan's coat of arms on a blue background on its front side, while the reverse showed the United States coat of arms. The flag was first raised on July 4, 1865, during the cornerstone-laying ceremony for the Soldiers’ National Cemetery monument at Gettysburg National Cemetery.

On August 4, 1886 the state flag was carried in a parade in San Francisco by a group of Michiganders. From the 1880s to 1910s the state flag was flown at every governor's inauguration; it was 28 square feet (2.6 m^{2}). In 1909 the USS Michigan was given a state flag by the Daughters of the American Revolution.

In 1873, Mr. James Dwyer was a book seller living in Salt lake City and on July 4th he raised a unique American flag in front of his store. The design was similar to the American flag, but in the center of the canton was a white field bearing the coat of arms of the state surrounded by the 37 stars. It measured 20 feet long.

=== Current flag ===
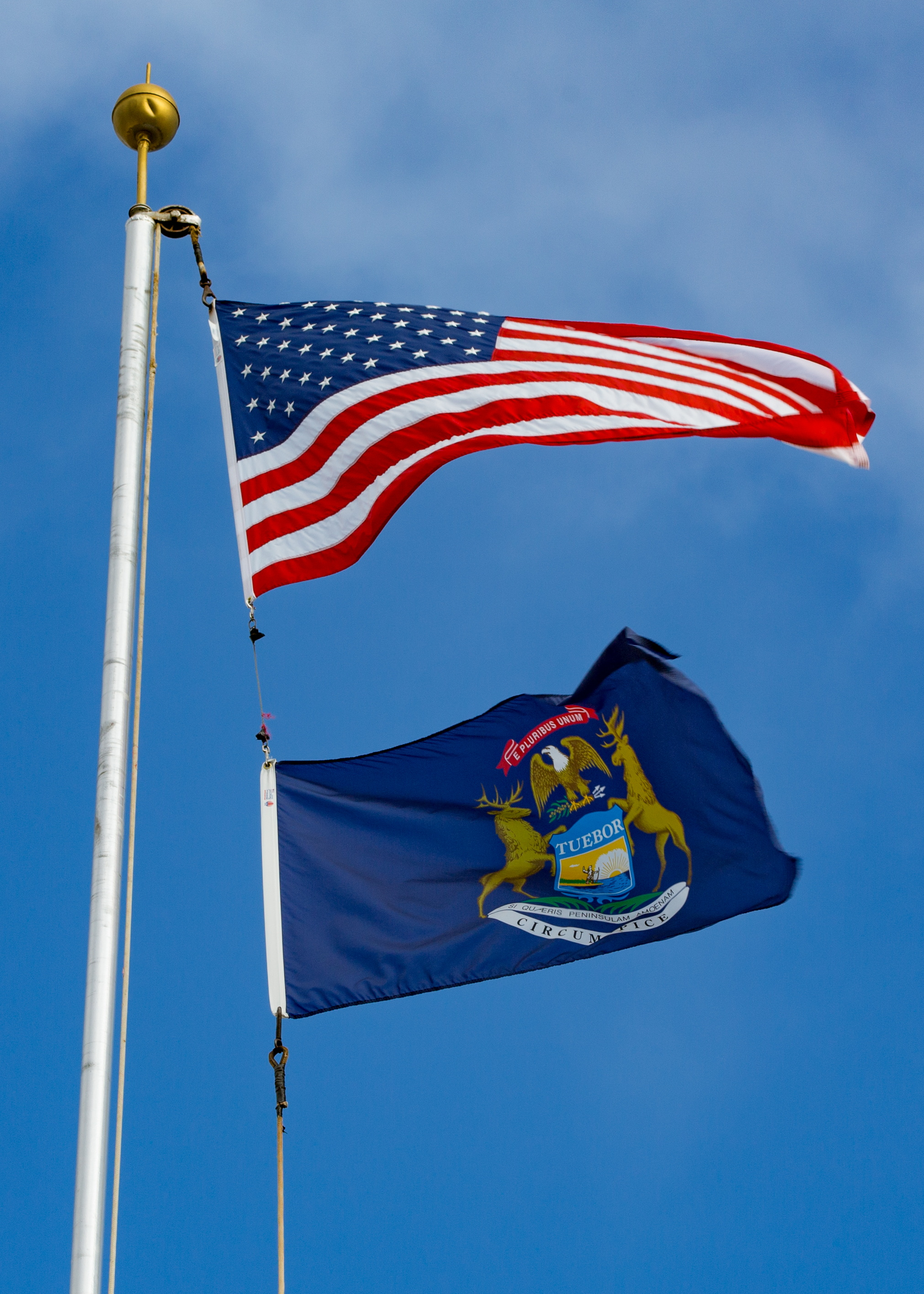
The Michigan flag flying below the U.S. flag

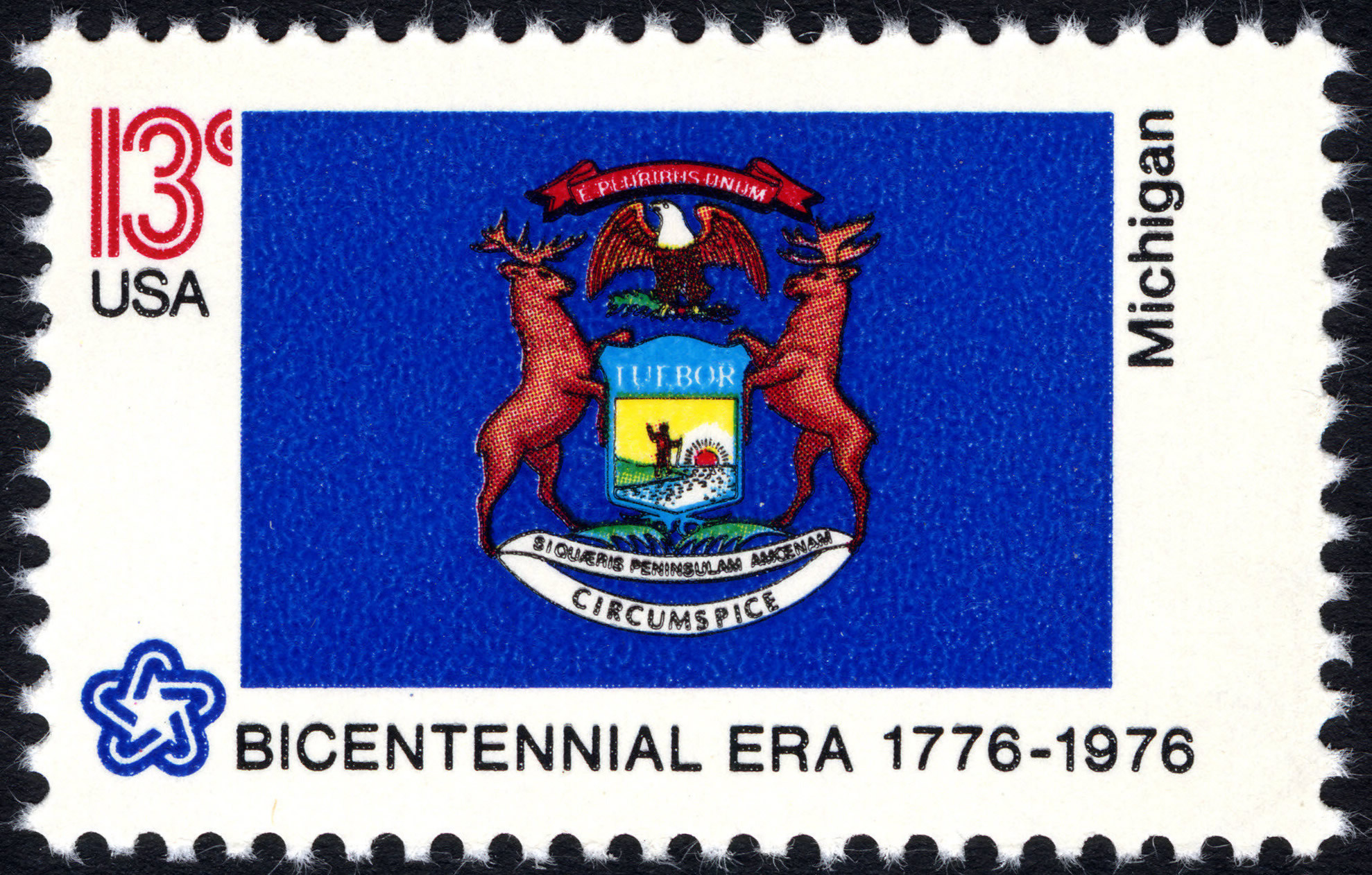
The Michigan state flag as depicted in the 1976 bicentennial postage stamp series

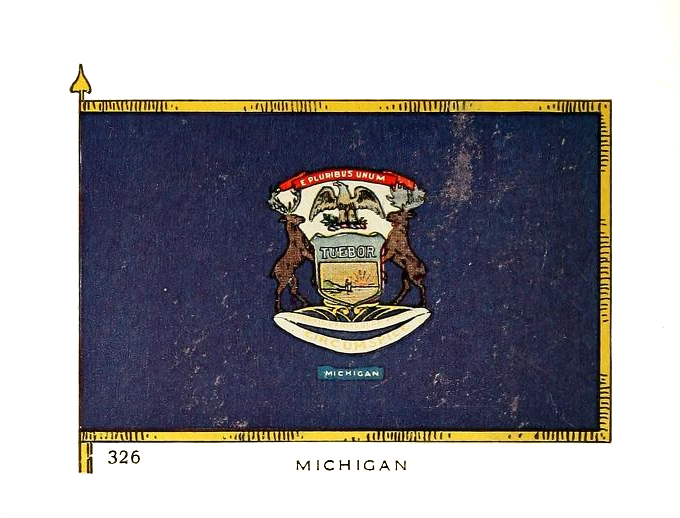
Depiction of the state flag from National Geographic, 1917

In 1911, as Michigan approached the 75th anniversary of its statehood, the state legislature chose to commemorate the occasion by adopting its first official state flag. The flag was adopted on August 1, 1911. The movement to adopt the flag was begun by Caroline Campbell, the same person who rediscovered the Brady Flag.. The new flag was meant to be displayed in schoolrooms beside the American national flag—both flown on the same flagpole, with the Michigan flag properly placed below the U.S. flag.

Prior to the early 20th century, flags were mainly used for military purposes, especially for identifying units. After the Civil War, however, public demand for flags increased. Memorial Day observances and soldiers' reunions fostered patriotic admiration for the national flag, and by the turn of the century it had become common to see the American flag flown over buildings and displayed inside schoolhouses. This growing culture of flag display led many states to begin adopting their own flags.

Michigan's blue field was chosen because of historical tradition. During the Civil War, all Union regimental designation flags were required to be blue and to bear the United States eagle emblem. Michigan followed this tradition after the war as well, continuing to use blue regimental flags with different emblems, reflecting this legacy of loyalty to the Union. Most of the northern states that fought for the Republic likewise chose predominantly blue fields.

In memory of the Brady Flag, Caroline Campbell also advocated for the adoption of the current governor's flag, which shares its white field with the Brady Flag.

The North American Vexillological Association, in its 2001 survey of U.S. state, U.S. territorial, and Canadian provincial flags rated the current Michigan flag 59th out of 72 flags evaluated. The survey respondents gave the flag an average score of 3.46 out of a possible 10 points.

== Attempts to change the flag ==
In November 2016, a bill was introduced in the Michigan state legislature by Senator Steven Bieda that would have provided for a flag commission to head up a public design contest to change the current state flag, but it was ultimately unsuccessful. Establishing a flag commission was proposed again in 2021, by Representative Andrea Schroeder. The measure was referred to committee, where no action was taken on it.

In 2023, Representative Phil Skaggs proposed a bill to redesign the state flag. It was introduced as House Bill 6190, on November 26, 2024, read a first time and referred to the Committee on Government Operations. The bill would have formed a commission of 6 local university artists, 3 professional artists or state historians selected by the Michigan Historical Commission and 8 political appointees to establish a contest to receive public design submissions between January 26, 2025 and July 26, 2025. The flag commission would have selected a winner by September 26, 2025, and the winning submission would have replaced the current state flag on January 1, 2026. As no action was taken on the bill before the end of the legislative session, it was also unsuccessful.

== Pledge ==
Michigan's pledge of allegiance to the state flag was written by Harold G. Coburn and was officially adopted in 1972:

I pledge allegiance to the flag of Michigan, and to the state for which it stands, two beautiful peninsulas united by a bridge of steel, where equal opportunity and justice to all is our ideal.

== See also ==
- List of flags of Michigan
- List of Michigan state symbols
- Flags of governors of the U.S. states
