= Burner (mobile application) =

Application for creating disposable phone numbers

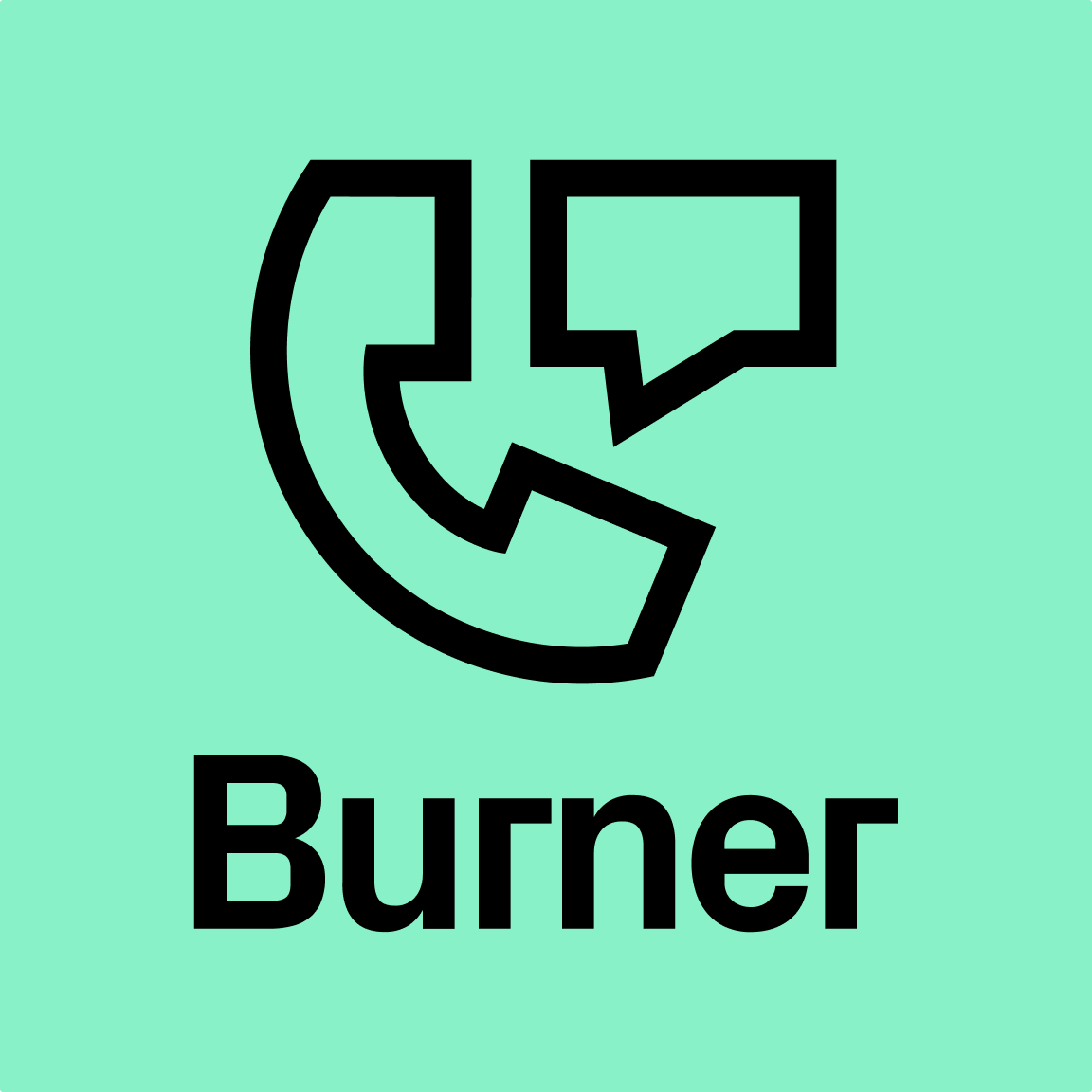
- Developer: Ad Hoc Labs
- Release: August 2012; 14 years ago
- Operating system: iOS, Android
- Type: Instant messaging client and VoIP
- License: Freemium
- Website: www.burnerapp.com

Burner is a mobile application for iOS and Android made by Ad Hoc Labs, Inc. that allows users to create temporary disposable phone numbers in the U.S. and Canada. The app allows smartphone users to have a phone number that is anonymous and can be thrown away, for purposes such as online ads, while traveling, for business projects, or for dating profiles. Burner is a product of Ad Hoc Labs, an Atwater Village, Los Angeles-based software startup.

The application's name is a reference to so-called "burner phones," prepaid mobile phones that are replaced frequently. The company has stated it would comply with law enforcement requests related to search warrants.

== History ==
The Burner application launched in August 2012 with angel investors including Techstars founder David Cohen and super angel Dave McClure in October 2012. Its iPhone application was released in August 2012, followed by an Android version in April 2013. In October 2013, Ad Hoc Labs raised an institutional funding round led by Founder Collective and Venrock, with participation from 500 Startups, Miramar Digital Ventures, TenOneTen Ventures and others. In an interview with Ars Technica, CEO Greg Cohn stated "we definitely think that communications, and telephony specifically, have been left behind by the wave of social innovation that’s been happening. The network should be smarter, it should be more socially aware and more privacy-aware." He has also stated that the long-term vision for Burner is to build technology where phone numbers are smarter and act more like software.

== Features ==
Burner allows users to make phone calls and VoIP calls and send SMS and MMS messages via phone numbers issued through the app. Users can purchase credits for temporary numbers or add an additional line for an ongoing subscription fee. The Burner Connections features, launched in October 2015, allow users to integrate their Burner numbers with third-party applications like Slack, Google Sheets, Dropbox, Evernote and SoundCloud. This functionality allows people to automatically archive SMS messages and images, program auto-responses, sync voicemails and more. In November 2015, Burner launched a way for developers to connect the app with various applications, like IFTTT, or create new custom integrations through the use of webhooks.

== Finances ==
During the 2020 COVID-19 pandemic, the group received between $350,000 and $1 million in federally backed small business loans from First Republic Bank as part of the Paycheck Protection Program. The organization stated it would help them retain 86 employees.
