= Rapid Finance =

American fintech company

- Formerly: RapidAdvance
- Type: Private
- Industry: Financial services
- Founded: 2005; 21 years ago
- Headquarters: Bethesda, Maryland, US
- Area served: United States
- Products: Small Business Loan, Merchant Cash Advance, Line of Credit, SBA Bridge Loan
- Owner: Dan Gilbert
- Number of employees: 254 (2016)
- Parent: Rockbridge Growth Equity; Rock Family of Companies
- Website: www.rapidfinance.com

Rapid Finance is a financial services company that provides working capital to small and mid-sized businesses in the United States in a variety of industries and categories. It is a sister company to Rocket Mortgage. According to its website as of 2019, it is the 4th largest online small business lender in the United States with over US$1 billion funded.

== History ==
The company was founded in 2005 as RapidAdvance and headquartered in Bethesda, Maryland. It was acquired by Dan Gilbert's Rockbridge Growth Equity, LLC in 2013. It is part of Rock Family of Companies that include the Cleveland Cavaliers, Fathead, Rocket Mortgage and Genius. The company went through a rebrand in 2019, changing its name to Rapid Finance.

In 2023, the company laid off 51 employees in its Detroit, Michigan facility.
