= Quizzle =

- Type: Public
- Industry: Personal finance, Software
- Founded: 2008
- Fate: Shut down by parent company Bankrate
- Headquarters: Detroit, Michigan
- Key people: Todd Albery, CEO
- Products: credit monitoring, credit report, credit score
- Parent: Bankrate
- Website: www.quizzle.com

Quizzle was a website that offered a free VantageScore 3.0 credit score and a free TransUnion credit report every three months. Quizzle was a tool to help consumers gain a complete understanding of their credit and provides tools to help users repair their credit and report problems with their credit report. Its CEO was Todd Albery.

== History ==
Quizzle, founded in 2008, was privately held and owned by Dan Gilbert. Headquartered in Detroit, it was part of a "family" of companies that includes the Cleveland Cavaliers, Fathead, and Quicken Loans.

As of April 2015, Quizzle was owned and operated by Bankrate, Inc.

In early 2016, Quizzle began using TransUnion as a replacement for Equifax, and VantageScore 3.0 for CE credit score.

In 2019, Quizzle was shut down and web site visitors are now directed to the site of its former owner Bankrate.

== See also ==
- Comparison of free credit report websites
- Credit Karma
- Credit Sesame
- Mint.com
