= Vinton Building =

- U.S. National Register of Historic Places
- U.S. Historic district – Contributing property
- Michigan State Historic Site
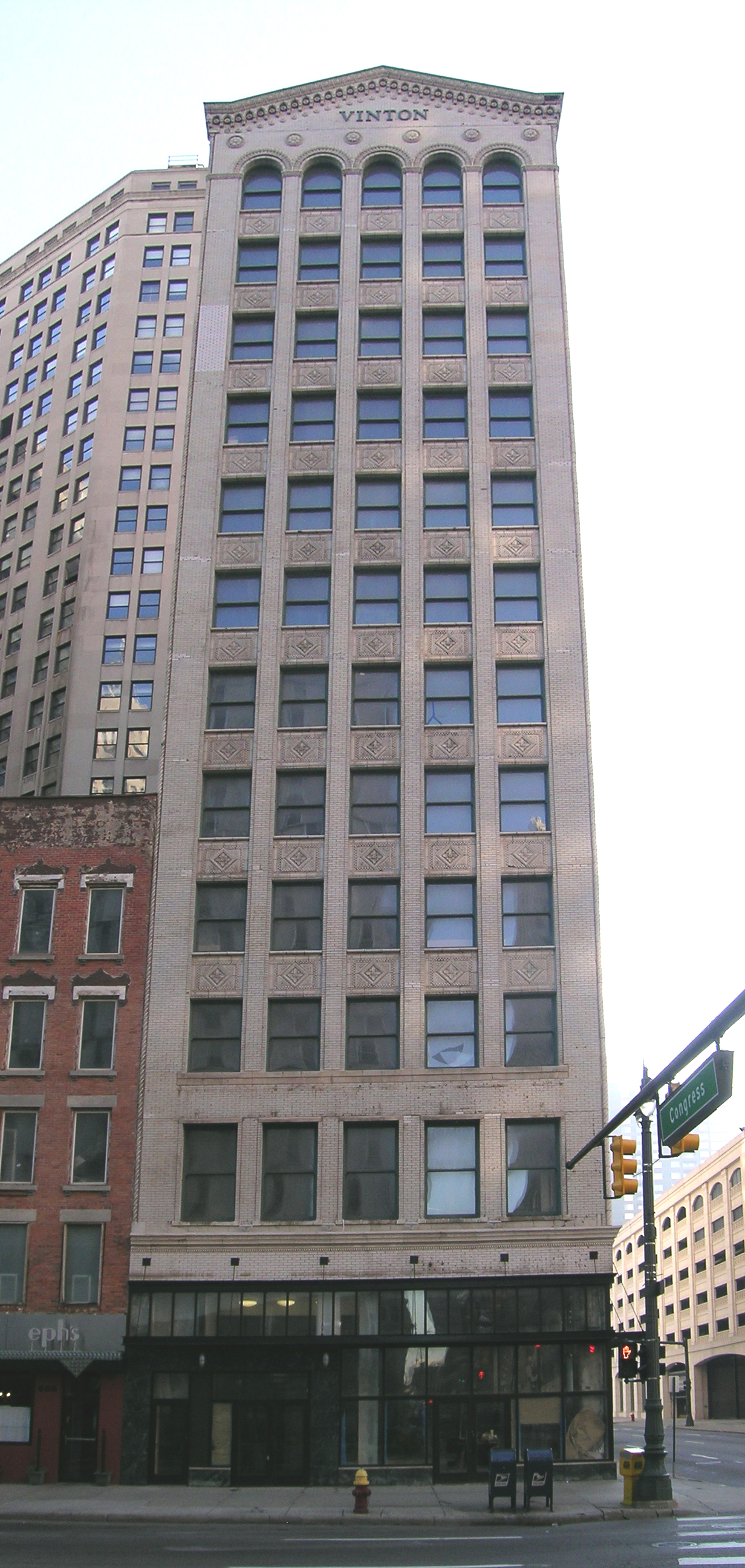
- Interactive map
- Location: 600 Woodward Avenue; Detroit, Michigan
- Coordinates: 42°19′49.9″N 83°2′44.59″W
- Built: 1917
- Architect: Albert Kahn
- Architectural style: Neo-Classical
- Part of: Detroit Financial District (ID09001067)
- NRHP reference No.: 83000898

Significant dates
- Added to NRHP: February 17, 1983
- Designated MSHS: November 16, 1982

The Vinton Building is a residential high-rise located at 600 Woodward Avenue (at the northeast corner of Woodward and Congress Street) in Downtown Detroit, Michigan. It stands next to the First National Building, across Woodward Avenue from Chase Tower (currently known as The Qube) and the Guardian Building, and across Congress Street from One Detroit Center. It was designated a Michigan State Historic Site in 1982 and listed on the National Register of Historic Places in 1983.

== Description ==
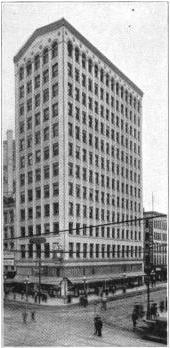
Vinton Building, c. 1922

The building, designed by Albert Kahn and completed in 1917, stands 12 stories tall, 172 ft. (52 m), with 2 basement levels for a total of 14 floors. Its primary uses are for offices and retail. The building was constructed in the neo-classical architectural style, and contains mainly terra cotta as its main material. It features a peaked parapet wall on the front façade, reminiscent of classical temples.

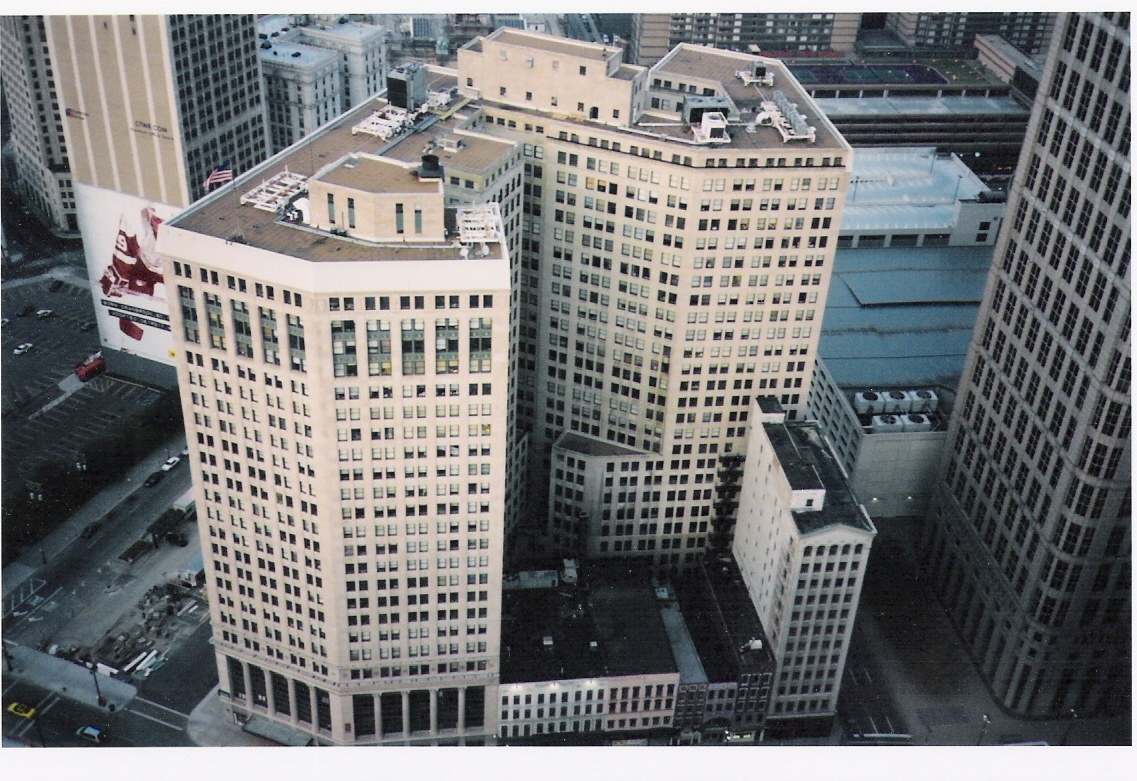
The Vinton Building at bottom right, next to the First National Building

== Failed Renovation ==
The Vinton underwent a reconstruction in 2006, turning the building into a loft building. The renovation included commercial space on the first two floors, and one loft on each of the additional ten floors. The renovation began in December 2005, and included a conversion of the basement into a parking level, ground floor retail, second floor commercial space, with the top ten floors being converted into multiple condominium units, one or two per floor.

Renovation of Vinton by owner Vinton Building, LLC and general contractor The Garrison Company began in December 2005, and included a conversion of the basement into a parking level, ground floor retail, and second floor commercial space, with the top ten floors being converted into multiple condominium units, one or two per floor. The reconstruction stalled and did not reopen as planned in 2007. By 2010, the renovation was officially halted.

=== Reopening with Bedrock ===
Bedrock, owned by Dan Gilbert, purchased the building in 2013.

In 2017, Bedrock undertook a renovation of the structure, working with Kraemer Design Group (KDG), a Detroit-based architectural firm. Known for its work in Toledo, Ohio, Charleston, North Carolina, and Detroit, KDG specializes in historic renovation projects, including historic landmarks. Redesigning not only the building’s exterior, but expanding its interior offerings, Vinton was upgraded to a luxury-style apartment building consisting of one-, two-, and three-bedroom luxury apartments. Vinton features biometric security and smart technology, in addition to upscale finishes and amenities. Another addition to the structure is the fine-dining restaurant, BESA, and a concierge service. Vinton is connected to the First National Parking Garage.
