= Simple Energy =

Simple Energy may refer to:

- Simple Energy (software company), software-as-a-service company in Colorado, US
- Simple Energy (vehicle company), electric vehicle company in Bangalore, India
- Simple Energy, the former parent company of Bulb Energy, an energy retailer in the UK

== See also ==
- Simply Energy, the former name of Engie Australia, an energy retailer in Victoria, Australia
