= True North Mortgage =

Canadian mortgage broker

- Founded: 1999
- Founder: Dan Eisner
- Key people: Dan Eisner, CEO
- Website: www.truenorthmortgage.ca

True North Mortgage is a Canadian retail store-based mortgage brokerage established in 1999. It provides residential mortgages and was the first Canadian broker to do so through a footprint of retail mortgage stores. It also operates the in-house discount broker THINK Financial.

== History ==
True North Mortgage was founded in 1999 by Dan Eisner. Its primary business focused on providing residential mortgages and was the first Canadian broker to do so through a footprint of retail mortgage stores.

In 2007, Eisner appeared on Dragons' Den. He was offered an investment deal for the company, but ultimately turned it down to maintain ownership and control over the company. The following year, Eisner partnered with James Laird, selling a 24 percent stage in the company, followed by Laird opening True North Mortgage locations in Ontario and Quebec. At the time it had ranked sixth among Canadian mortgage brokers based on volume of mortgages handled.

True North Mortgage became the first Canadian mortgage brokerage to be granted approved lender status from the National Housing Act, obtaining such in 2016.

In 2018, it brokered approximately $1.5 billion in mortgages, primarily through its subsidiary Think Financial.

True North Mortgage hired more than 25 former Rocket Mortgage employees in Canada in 2025 after Rocket announced it would cease offering mortgages in the country.

== Operations ==
True North Mortgage's business model is to use salaried professionals in high-traffic retail locations. It primarily operates as a mortgage brokerage, arranging residential mortgages for home purchases, refinances, and renewals through third-party lenders. It also operates THINK Financial, a discount broker which is a CMHC approved lender.
