= Yewande Akinse =

Nigerian lawyer, author, entrepreneur

Yewande Akinse (Adebowale)
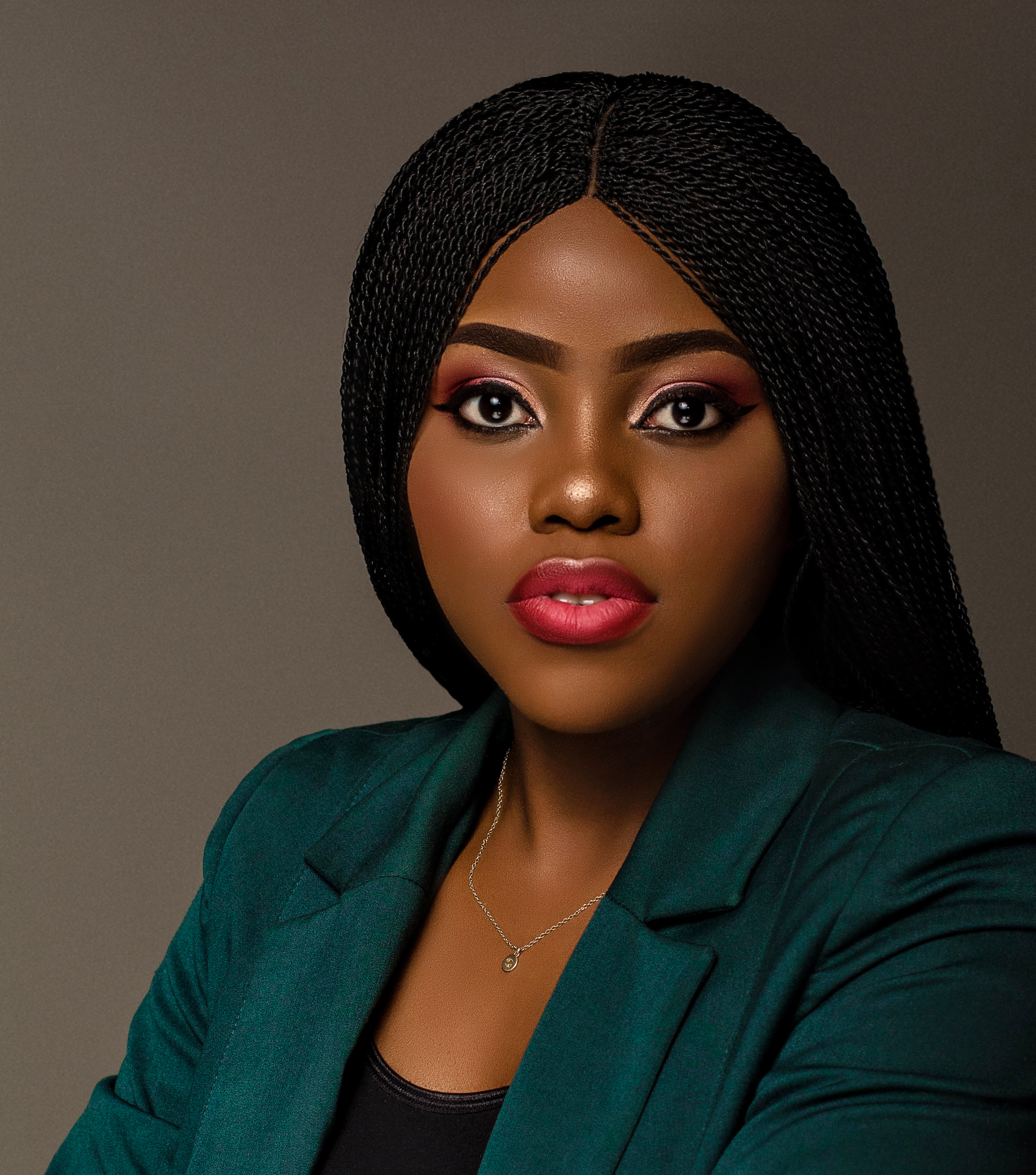
- Born: Yewande Adebowale; September 25, 1992 (age 34); Lagos State
- Education: Nigerian Law School, University of Lagos
- Occupations: Poet, Lawyer, Author and Entrepreneur
- Known for: Co-founder Salubata
- Website: yewande.us

Yewande Akinse (née Adebowale) is a Nigerian poet, author and entrepreneur who co-founded, Salubata, Pap.earth and Plychain.

She received the African Adaptation Solutions Challenge and the Commonwealth Youth award in connection with the 2022 Commonwealth Heads of Government Meeting in Kigali, Rwanda.

== Education ==
Yewande Akinse was born on September 25, 1992, in Lagos, Nigeria. She attended St. Mary's Private School in Ajele, Lagos before moving on to the Holy Child College, Lagos, where she completed her secondary education. She obtained her LL.B degree and LL.M degree at the University of Lagos. In 2014 she earned her B.L degree at Nigerian Law School.

== Career ==
Yewande Akinse is a lawyer, social entrepreneur, poet and author as well as an advocate of climate change. She is the co-founder of PAP. EARTH, an eco search engine which covers the removal of CO_{2} and controls Climate change, and Salubata, a company that makes modular shoes crafted from recycled plastic waste.

She has over 110 published poems. Her works include the collections "A Tale of being, of green and of ing.." (2019) and "Voices: A collection of poems that tell stories" (2016).

In 2021, Akinse became one of 15 young African entrepreneurs to win the first edition of the African Youth Adaptation (YouthADAPT) Solutions Challenge.

In 2022, Ex-President, Muhammadu Buhari appreciated her for emerging as one of the top four winners in the Commonwealth Youth competition, at the 26th Commonwealth Heads of Government Meeting (CHOGM) held in Kigali, Rwanda.

On 8 September 2022, she emerged as the winner of the World Bank YouthActonEDU Spoken Word Prize.

== Writings ==
Yewande Adebowale is a Poet and Author. Her poems have appeared in Trampset, Galleyway, Afritondo, Unclear Magazine, Pride Magazine, and Tampered Press,

== Books ==
- A Tale of being, of green and of ing (2019)
- Voices: A collection of poems that tell stories (2016)
- Earth is Green and Blue (2026)
- Psych Boulevard (2026)
- The Harmony of Ing and Isms (2026)
- The rise and fall of rhymes and rhythms (2025)

== Awards and recognition ==
- Tory Burch Entrepreneur Fellow 2024
- African Adaptation Solutions Challenge
- Commonwealth Youth Green Guru Award
- Best Graduating Student, Holy Child College, 2008
- 2013, Fidelity Bank Prize for Creative Writing
- 2019, The Guardian Newspaper (TGN) Prize for Poetry
- 2020, Project Knucklehead Prize for Creative Rebellion
- World Bank YouthActonEDU Spoken Word Prize, 2022
- FemSTEM Africa Pitch Competition
- Allergan Aesthetics & IFundWomen Business Grant Award
