= Jay Farner =

American businessman

- Born: March 24, 1973 (age 53); Detroit, Michigan, U.S.
- Education: Michigan State University (BA)
- Occupations: Founder and CEO of Ronin Capital
- Children: 3

Jay Farner (born March 24, 1973) is an American businessman and investor. He is the founder and CEO of Ronin Capital Partners, a venture capital firm. Previously, Farner was the Vice Chairman and chief executive officer of Rocket Companies (formerly known as Quicken Loans), which includes Rocket Mortgage, the nation's largest retail mortgage lender. Farner was also the CEO of Rock Holdings incorporated.

== Early life and education ==
In 1995, Jay Farner graduated with a bachelor's degree in Finance from Michigan State University. There, he restarted its business fraternity Delta Sigma Pi. As of 2021, Farner resides in the Detroit area.

== Career ==
After his graduation from Michigan State, Jay Farner began his career in finance as a mortgage banker at Quicken Loans Inc (then called Rock Financial) with Dan Gilbert in 1996. In early 1997, Farner became the director of mortgage banking, then vice president of web mortgage banking in May 1998. Rock Financial's online presence drew the attention of Intuit Inc., which bought the firm in 1999 from Gilbert for $336 million before later selling it back to him in 2002 for $130 million. The company grew to provide direct-to-consumer home loans via the internet in all 50 states. Farner then served as Quicken's president and chief marketing officer, and was named one of Crain’s Detroit Business’ 40 Under 40 in 2011.

In 2014, Farner led what USA Today called a “billion-dollar gamble” in a March Madness bracket challenge with Yahoo Sports that offered a potential $1 billion prize. While the top prize was not claimed, the campaign resulted in $3 million in smaller prizes; PR Week described the campaign as a significant "data generation exercise," while other industry observers cited it as a successful marketing initiative.

In 2015, Farner led the development of Rocket Mortgage, an end-to-end digital mortgage platform. The service allowed consumers to complete the application process online, a shift in the industry that received comparisons to digital tax preparation software. Upon launch, TechCrunch described the platform as the mortgage industry's “iPhone moment.”

Quicken Loans’ Rocket Mortgage released an ad at the 2016 Super Bowl with the tagline “Push Button, Get Mortgage.” While some critics expressed concern that the simplified process shared characteristics with the pre-2008 mortgage market, the company maintained that its lending standards remained distinct from the subprime models of that era.

In 2017, Farner was promoted to CEO of Quicken Loans. That quarter, Quicken Loans originated $25 billion in home loans, surpassing Wells Fargo as the largest retail home lender in the US. In August 2020, Farner led the parent company, Rocket Companies Inc, through its initial public offering on the New York Stock Exchange, raising $1.8 billion.

In February 2023, Farner announced his retirement as CEO of Rocket Companies, effective June 1, 2023. He was succeeded by interim CEO Bill Emerson and subsequently by Varun Krishna in September 2023. Following his departure, Farner founded Ronin Capital Partners, a venture capital firm.

== Philanthropy ==
In 2025, Farner and his partner, Nicole Vallianatos, established the Jay Farner Family Foundation, focusing on medical research. Through the foundation, they are major donors supporting the Cleveland Clinic Brain Study, a 20-year longitudinal study aimed at identifying early biomarkers for neurological diseases. The foundation also provides funding for pediatric and breast cancer research initiatives at the Cleveland Clinic.

In August 2026, the foundation donated to the Kirk Gibson Center for Parkinson's Wellness in Farmington Hills, Michigan, to support the expansion of its activity-based wellness and exercise programs.
