= Mr. Cooper Group =

US mortgage, financial services company

Mr. Cooper Group Inc.
- Trade name: Mr. Cooper
- Formerly: WMI Holdings Corporation
- Type: Subsidiary
- Traded as: Nasdaq: COOP
- Industry: Financial services
- Predecessor: Washington Mutual
- Founded: 1889; 137 years ago
- Headquarters: Coppell, Texas, United States
- Area served: United States
- Key people: Jay Bray (chairman and CEO)
- Products: Mortgage Loans, conventional Loans, FHA Loans, FHA Streamline Loans, VA Loans, VA IRRRL
- Revenue: US$3.318 billion (2021)
- Operating income: US$898 million (2021)
- Net income: US$1.4 billion (2021)
- Total assets: US$14.2 billion (2021)
- Number of employees: 8,200 (2021)
- Parent: Rocket Companies
- Subsidiaries: Xome; Rushmore Servicing; Nationstar Mortgage
- Website: www.mrcooper.com

Mr. Cooper Group, formerly WMI Holdings Corporation, is an American home loan servicer headquartered in the Dallas, Texas, area. Mr. Cooper Group specializes in residential mortgages, mortgage refinancing, home loans, and home loan refinancing. As of 2023, it was one of the largest mortgage servicers in the United States with a servicing portfolio of approximately $937 billion and more than 4.3 million customers. The company was acquired by Rocket Companies in 2025.

== History ==
Mr. Cooper Group was formed in 2018 as the merger between WMI Holdings Corporation and Nationstar.

=== WMI Holdings Corporation (1889-2018) ===
WMI Holdings Corporation was incorporated as the Washington National Building Loan and Investment Association on September 25, 1889, after the Great Seattle Fire destroyed 120 acres (49 ha) of the central business district of Seattle. The newly formed company made its first home mortgage loan on the West Coast on February 10, 1890. It changed its name to Washington Savings and Loan Association on June 25, 1908. By September 12, 1917, it was operating under the name Washington Mutual Savings Bank.

In mid-2008, WaMu customers pulled out $16.7 billion in deposits over the course of ten days. On the night of September 25, the Office of Thrift Supervision seized WaMu Bank and placed it into the receivership of the FDIC. The FDIC then sold most of WaMu Bank's assets, including the branch network.

On September 26, 2008, WaMu, Inc., and its remaining subsidiary, WMI Investment Corp., filed for Chapter 11 bankruptcy and after seven plans to reorganize the company finally emerged from Chapter 11 bankruptcy the following month as WMI Holdings Corporation. In 2018 WMI Holdings Corporation merged with Nationstar to form Mr. Cooper.

=== Nationstar (1994-2018) ===
Nationstar was founded in Denver, Colorado, in 1994. In 1997, the company moved to Dallas, Texas, where home-builder Centex Homes established Nova Credit Corporation as their in-house lender for new construction and changed the company name to Centex Credit Corporation. In 2001, Centex Credit Corporation was merged into Centex Home Equity Company, and it operated as the subprime mortgage originator and servicer for Centex until 2005.

In 2005, the decision was made to withdraw Centex Homes from non-home-building businesses, including the mortgage business. Fortress Investment Group acquired Centex Home Equity and renamed it Nationstar Mortgage in 2006.

In March 2012, Nationstar Mortgage Holdings, Inc. went public with an initial public offering on the New York Stock Exchange.

Nationstar Mortgages, LLC, is the consumer-facing mortgage lender and servicer that operates under the service mark "Mr. Cooper". In August 2017, Nationstar Mortgages, LLC, announced it was changing its name to Mr. Cooper after releasing its worst financial report to date. The company stated that the name change was meant to "personalize the mortgage experience". In 2018 Nationstar and WMI Holdings Corporation (WMIH), the corporate successor to the defunct Washington Mutual, merged. As a result Nationstar was delisted from the New York Stock Exchange and WMIH changed its name to Mr. Cooper Group.

=== Mr. Cooper Group (2018-present) ===
In 2018, Mr. Cooper paid out millions of dollars in settlements in New York and California due to various violations of state banking laws.

In 2020, Mr. Cooper originated over 146,000 mortgages with a total value of over $36 billion. In 2020, Mr. Cooper agreed to a $91 million settlement with the CFPB, all 50 states, and three U.S. territories, for mishandling foreclosures and borrowers' payments. More than $74 million of the settlement was directed back to consumers whose homes were foreclosed on while waiting for approval of their loan modifications and consumers whose monthly payments were increased without notice or consent.

On October 31, 2023, Mr. Cooper was the subject of a cyber-attack which compromised customer data. In March 2025, Rocket Companies Inc. announced that it was purchasing Mr. Cooper at $9.4 billion, an all-stock deal that closed October that year.
