= Zagster =

American startup company

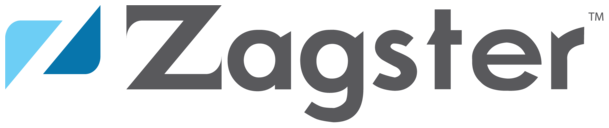

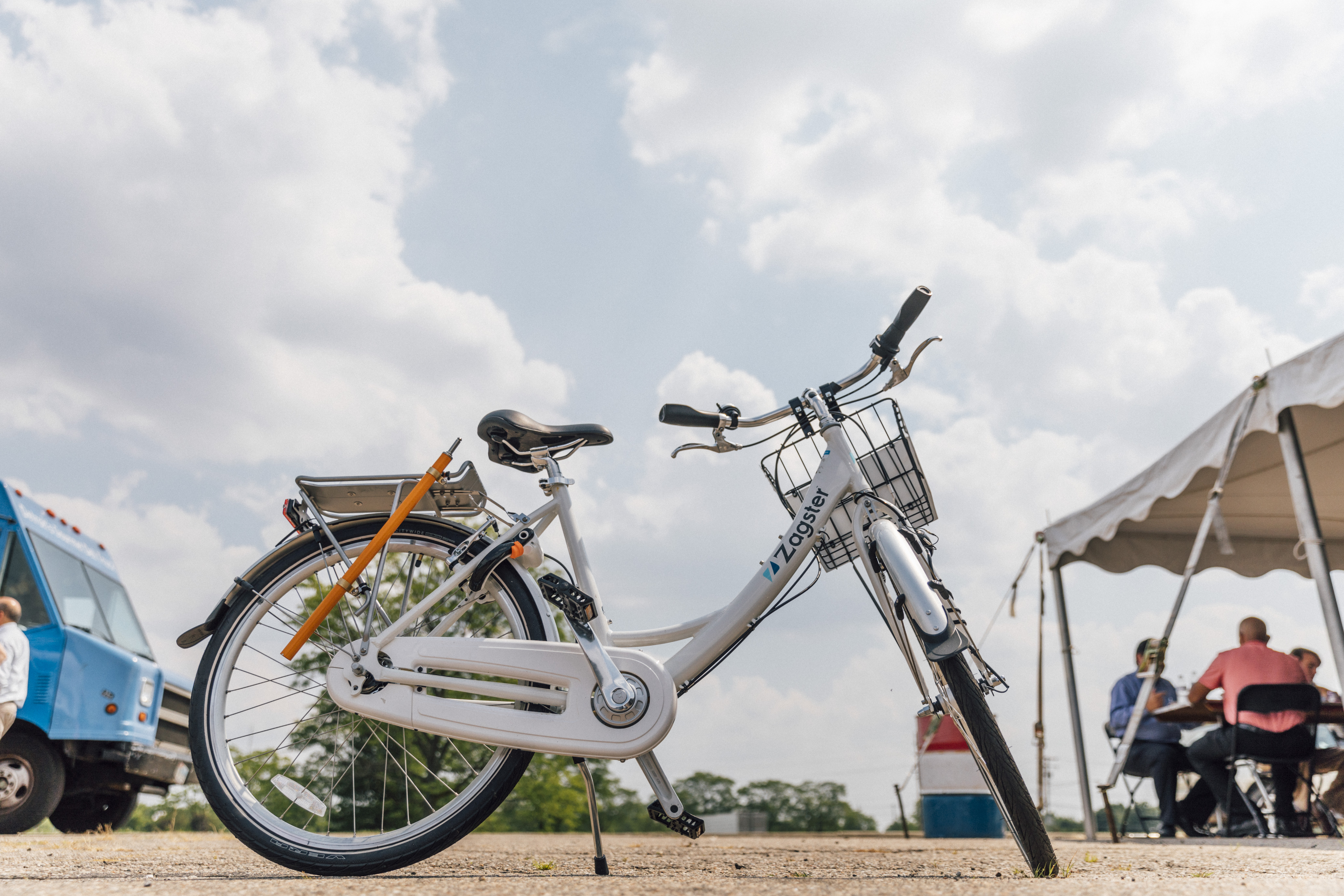
- Formerly: CityRyde
- Company type: Private
- Founded: 2007; 19 years ago in Philadelphia, Pennsylvania
- Founders: Timothy Ericson (CEO & Co-founder), Jason Meinzer (co-founder)
- Defunct: June 2020
- Headquarters: Boston, Massachusetts, United States
- Website: zagster.com

Zagster (est. in 2007) was a venture-funded startup company based in Boston, Massachusetts that designed, built and operated bike sharing programs for cities, universities, corporate campuses, hotels, and residential communities across the United States. As of July 2019, it operated over 200 bike sharing programs. The bicycle program was suspended in March 2020 due to the COVID-19 pandemic, and then the company terminated bicycle sharing operations in June 2020 and sold its scooter operations division to Superpedestrian.

== History ==
Zagster was founded in 2007 by Drexel University graduates Timothy Ericson and Jason Meinzer as "CityRyde". CityRyde initially sought to operate a bike-sharing program in the Philadelphia region, but later established itself as a software provider and consultant in the industry.

In September 2009, CityRyde launched Spark, the world’s first off-the-shelf bike-sharing fleet management software, at the University of Chicago. Spark's features included electronic user registration, automated rental processes, integration with automated locking mechanisms, a customized reporting dashboard, and the ability to integrate with existing systems. Spark was implemented at 10 universities, including the University of Chicago, Cornell University, University of Colorado at Boulder and Drexel University.

In July 2011, CityRyde received Verified Carbon Standard validation of its software.

In 2012 CityRyde was renamed Zagster and moved to Cambridge, Massachusetts to join the TechStars startup accelerator program. Zagster was also selected as a finalist for the MassChallenge startup competition in 2012. The company raised a $1M funding round in fall 2012 led by LaunchCapital, which also included Fontinalis Partners, Jean Hammond, John Landry, and Semyon Dukach.

Zagster launched bike sharing programs for General Motors, Duke University, and Cleveland, Ohio in the summer of 2014. In 2015, the company launched bike sharing programs for Workday, Inc., Intuitive Surgical, Purdue University, and Samsung in California.

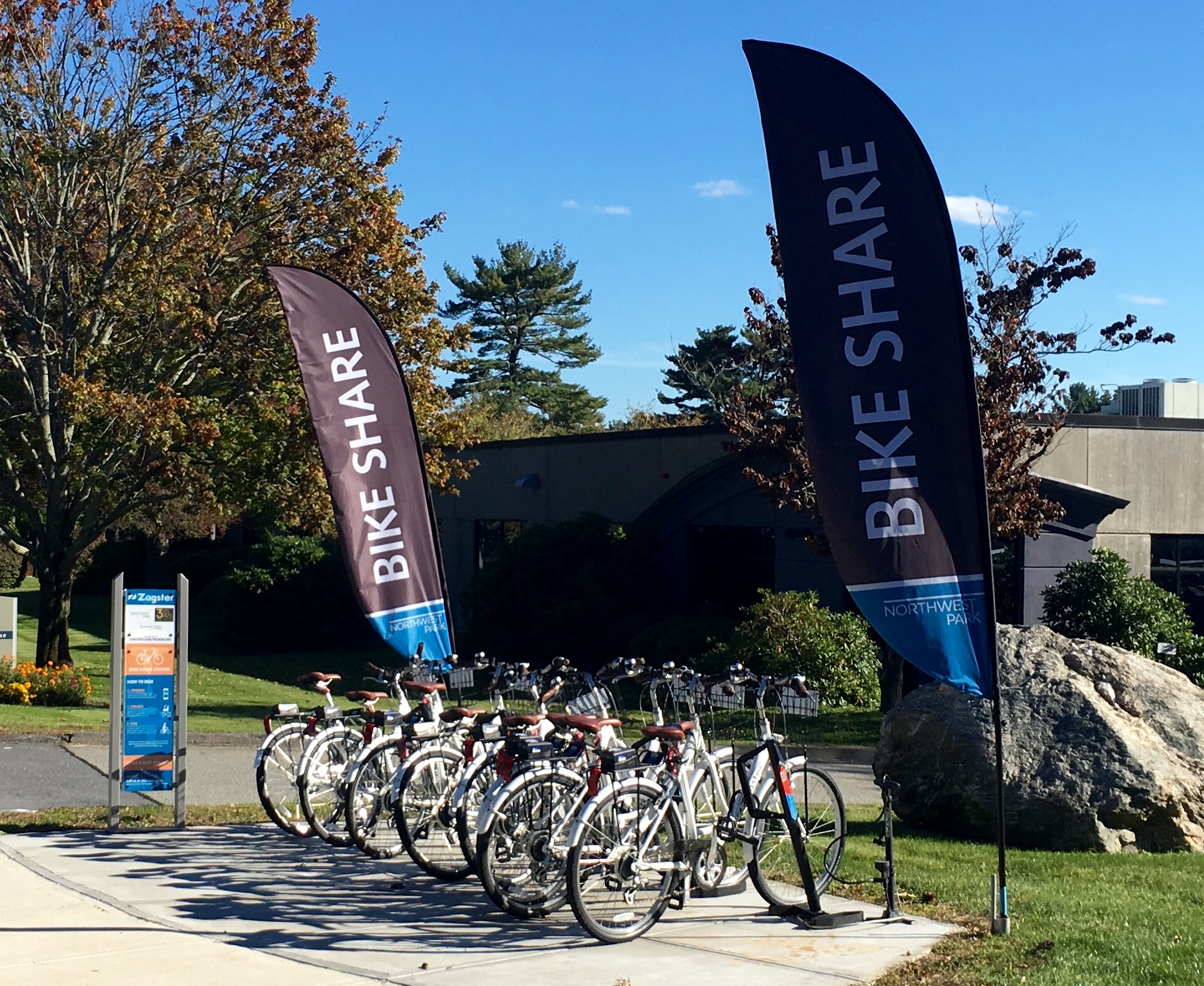
A Zagster bike sharing station

On December 12, 2018, Zagster began operating under the name "Pace" in the city of Santa Clarita, CA.

In January 2019, Zagster started performing fleet management services for scooter and e-bike companies with Spin being their first client. This model expanded during 2019 with Zagster partnering with multiple micromobility companies on fleet management.

The bicycle program was suspended in March 2020 due to the COVID-19 pandemic, and then the company terminated all operations in June 2020. Boston-based micromobility startup Superpedestrian acquired Zagster's e-scooter operations and launched a shared electric scooter-sharing service called Link.

== Technology & operating model ==
Zagster built and operated bike sharing programs as a service. The company provided its customers with bike sharing infrastructure and technology as well as design, implementation and operation services. Zagster employed local maintenance staff to service and operate its bike sharing systems including performing repairs and system rebalancing.

Bikes were secured through an electronic lock that is unlocked through the use of an iOS or Android mobile application or text message sent to a Zagster operated SMS service. Because the locking system is completely self-contained on the bicycle, riders were able to make 'stopovers', securing the Zagster bicycle temporarily at any location during their trip.

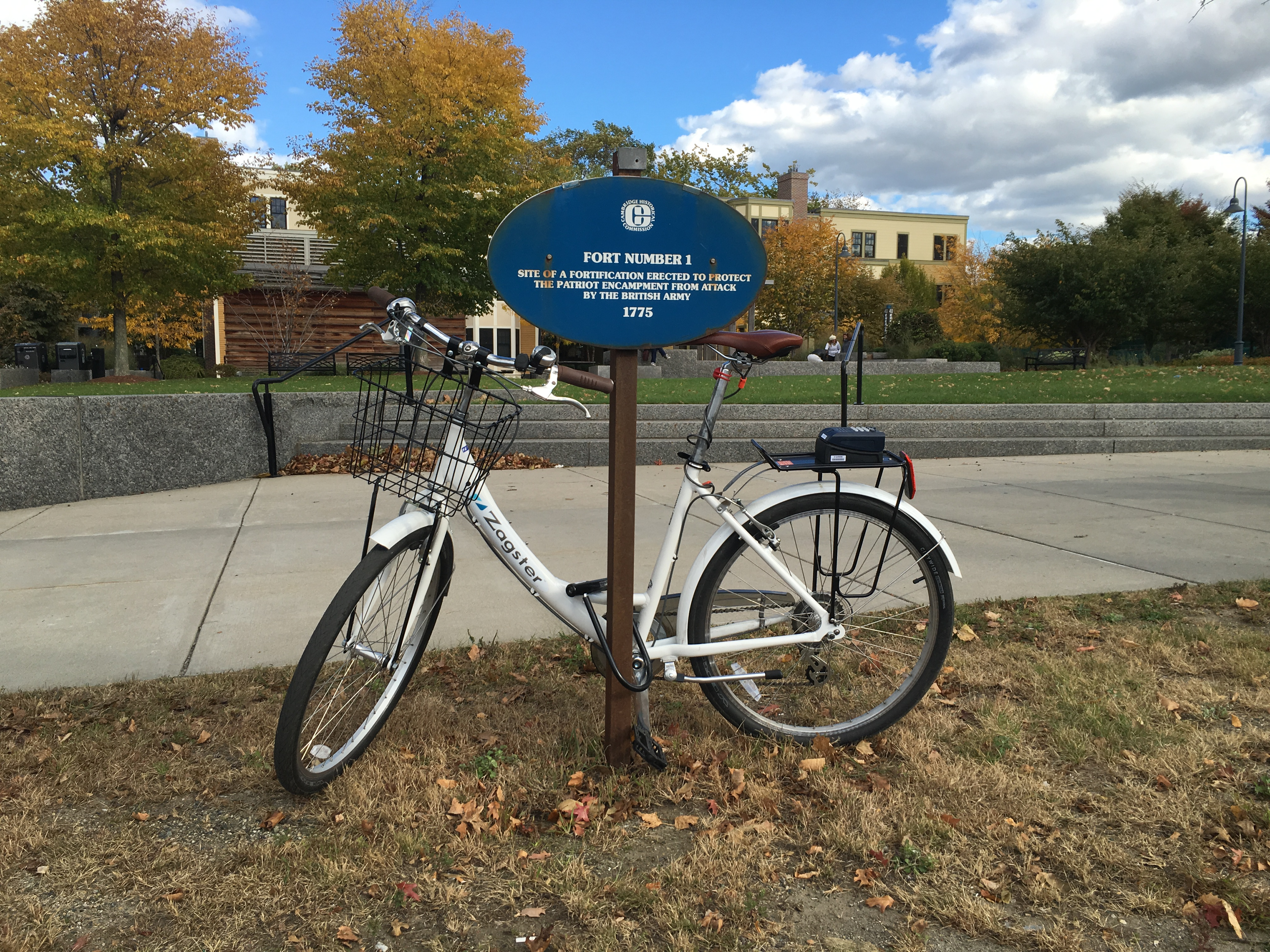
Zagster bike on a 'stopover' trip

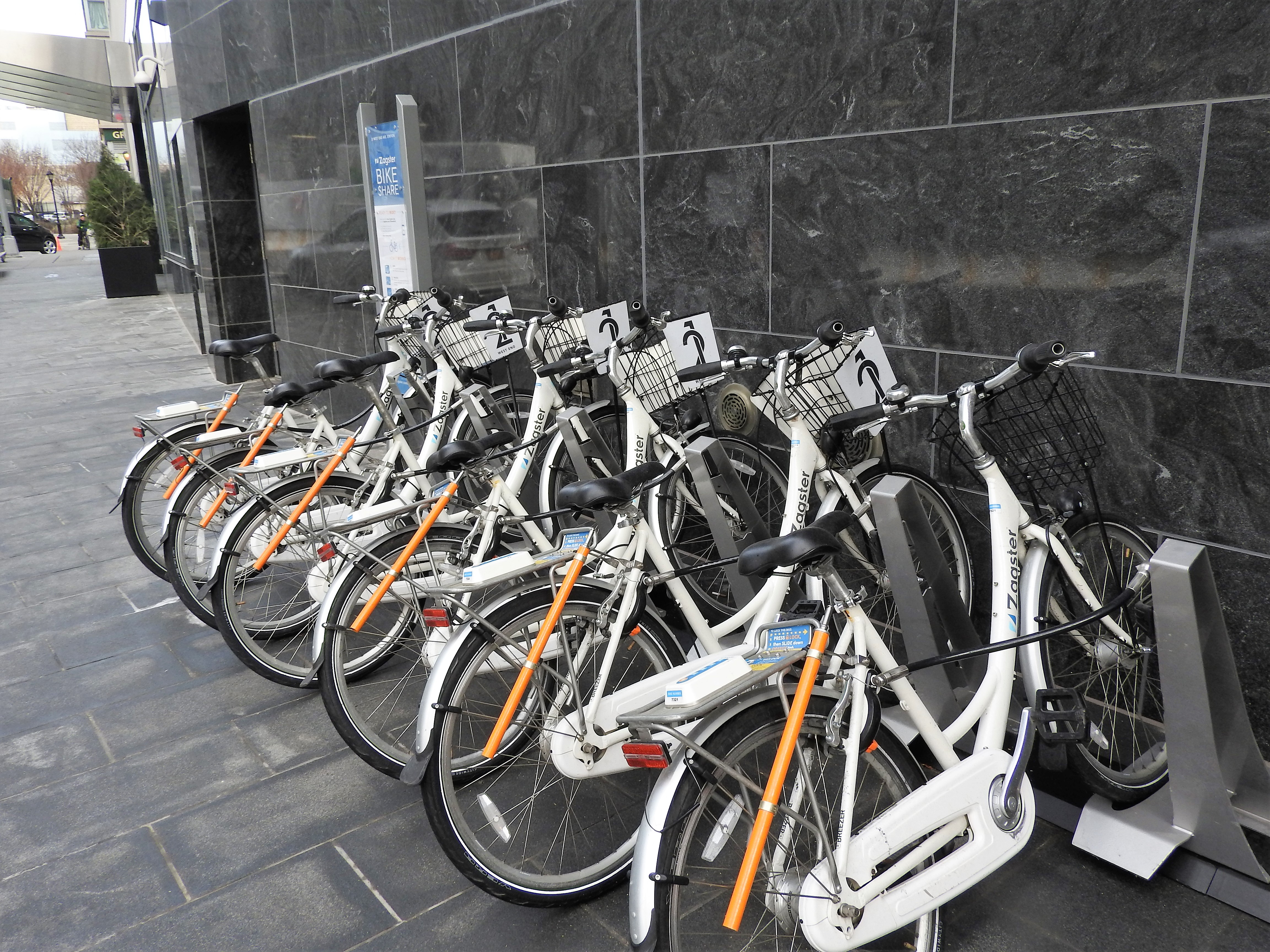
Manhattan station

Zagster's model of "bike share as a service" allowed the company to operate its business model differently from other bike sharing companies. In municipal installations, the company used a consortium of local sponsors to provide a much larger network than would have been possible if the city needed to pay for the full cost of the infrastructure. Because Zagster did not require customers to purchase equipment, it was able to pilot bike sharing programs and scale them rapidly to meet ridership needs. Zagster replaced all bikes in its bike sharing programs every three years and donates the refurbished bikes locally.

== Partners ==
Zagster ran more than 200 such programs throughout the country, including systems for Princeton University, Cornell University, Yale University, Salem, MA, Cleveland, Ohio, Quicken Loans, Hyatt, General Motors, The Related Companies, Irvine Company and Four Seasons Hotels and Resorts.

== See also ==
- Bicycle-sharing system
- List of bicycle-sharing systems
