= Rheaply =

Software as a service company

Rheaply, Inc.
- Type: Corporation
- Industry: Asset recovery, circular economy
- Headquarters: Chicago, Illinois, U.S.
- Area served: Worldwide
- Key people: Garry Cooper Jr. (co-founder & CEO); Tyler Skelton (co-founder & CPO); Peter Tucker (co-founder & CTO); Connie Kim (COO); Thomas Fecarotta III (CMO); Garr Punnett (chief of Staff & sustainability)
- Services: Enterprise asset management, asset recovery, reverse logistics
- Number of employees: 53
- Website: Rheaply website

Rheaply, Inc. is a privately held B2B Software as a service company that specializes in enterprise asset management technology for the circular economy. The company markets resource exchange technology to improve asset recovery outcomes and internal reuse of physical assets within large organizations. Rheaply operates a progressive web application for resource management in higher education, government, enterprise, biopharma, built environment and retail organizations. The company is located in Chicago, Illinois.

== History ==
=== Beginnings ===
Rheaply was founded by Garry Cooper, Peter Tucker and Tyler Skelton in Chicago in 2015. The company started out as a peer-to-peer, virtual marketplace for laboratory equipment and consumables within higher education, where postdoctoral and graduate researchers could share unneeded resources, message each other and connect with nearby departments and laboratories. The name is a portmanteau of “research” and “cheaply.” Today, Rheaply uses circular economy principles and technology to bring better efficiencies to resource recovery and reuse within and across organizations.

=== Growth and expansion ===
The company joined the startup accelerator Techstars and was named one of Built in Chicago's “50 Startups to Watch” in 2018. In 2019, Rheaply was selected into the 2019 MIT Solve Circular class, an open innovation initiative of the Massachusetts Institute of Technology to solve world challenges. The company also earned the Leadership Award for Advancing the Circular Economy from the Sustainable Purchasing Leadership Council.

On March 18, 2020, Rheaply raised $2.5M in a seed round led by Hyde Park Angels, with participation from Concentric Equity Partners, M25, and Techstars Ventures. In April 2020, Rheaply launched its Emergency Resource Exchange (ERx) to address shortages in personal protective equipment and medical supplies during the COVID-19 pandemic.

On December 3, 2020, Rheaply was awarded a $1 million investment during a pitch event, Revolution's Rise of the Rest Virtual Tour: Equity Edition with Steve Case. The startups were chosen out of the more than 450 black startup founders who applied to participate in the competition.

On February 16, 2021, Rheaply announced an $8M Series A investment round led by High Alpha, with additional participation from 100 Black Angels & Allies Fund, Concrete Rose Capital, Hyde Park Angels, M25, MCJ Collective, Morgan Stanley Multicultural Innovation Lab, the Revolution Rise of the Rest Seed Fund, and Salesforce Ventures.

In May of 2021, Rheaply was one of 15 companies selected by Goldman Sachs to participate in the 2021 Launch With GS Entrepreneur Cohort, which provides access and resources to U.S.-based Black and Latinx founders to “fast-track their companies’ growth and build relationships with investors and industry experts.”

On Dec 22, 2021, the Environmental Protection Agency’s Small Business Innovative Research (SBIR) Program invested in Rheaply to enhance building material recycling, and empower decarbonization efforts by reporting on estimated embodied carbon savings related to reuse.

In June of 2022, Rheaply announced a raise of $20M, led by Revolution’s Rise of the Rest Seed Fund. Additional investors included the John Doerr Family Trust, Emerson Collective, and various other new and prior investors.

In recognition of his efforts building Rheaply, Cooper has earned numerous honors, including Crain’s Chicago’s “40 Under 40” list, the Forbes “Next 1000” list, and the cover of Entrepreneur magazine’s pandemic response edition.

== Business model and partnerships ==
Rheaply has been used by numerous universities, including Northwestern University, MIT, Washington University in St. Louis, University of Illinois at Chicago. Rheaply also services private enterprises such as Google, Exelon, and AbbVie. In addition to its private sector service offering, Rheaply partners with state and local governments looking to provide access to surplus and salvaged resources at cost-effective rates.

Rheaply offers a sliding subscription & freemium model, which allows users to post castoffs and browse for supplies, many free or at a steep discount. In 2022, Rheaply launched an embodied carbon avoidance tool to enable companies to better understand the environmental impacts of resource exchange.

In May 2020, Rheaply partnered with the City of Chicago to launch the Chicago PPE Market, designed to help small businesses and nonprofits obtain protective equipment for their employees.

In late-November 2020, Rheaply joined the Ellen MacArthur Foundation member network, the world's leading circular economy network.
