= Salubata =

Nigerian shoe manufacturer

SALUBATA
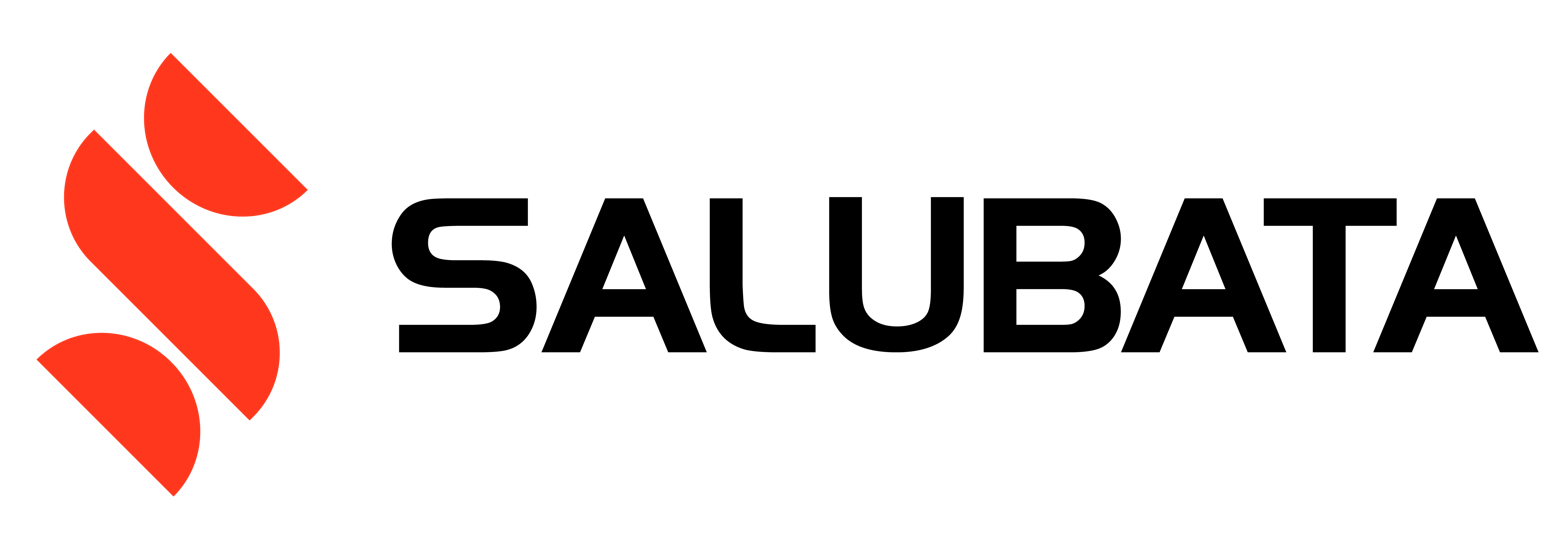
- Founded: United States (2020, as Salubata)
- Headquarters: Nigeria, France, United States
- Key people: Fela Buyi Akinse; Yewande Akinse
- Website: www.salubataofficial.com

SALUBATA is a shoe design and manufacturing company that collects and converts plastic waste into customized shoes.

In 2020, SALUBATA won the Institute of Electrical and Electronics Engineers and became the first IEEE Entrepreneurship Stars Virtual Competition.

== History ==
Salubata is a global brand, started in Nigeria, registered in France and currently headquartered in the United States. Founded in 2020 by Fela Buyi Akinse alongside Yewande Akinse.

The company invented two globally patented technologies which are modular shoes made or repurposed from plastic wastes and carbon decomposition shoe technology. Five per cent of SALUBATA profits from shoe sales are used in empowering children and women in underprivileged communities.

In 2022, they were announced as the winner of Kigali Startup Festival at the Commonwealth Youth Forum (CYF) in Kigali, and currently have a partnership with Amazon (company), Techstars Accelerator Los Angeles, and has been featured on TechCrunch, Business of Fashion.

In 2023, They were shortlisted from 650 entries worldwide in over 20 different countries on Make it Circular Challenge and were the winner of Circularity 20 at GreenBiz's online circular economy event.

== Awards ==
The winners of the Youth Adaptation Solutions Challenge 2021 by the African Development Bank and the Global Center on Adaptation.

- Swiss Africa Business Innovation Initiative (SABII), award by Venturelab.
- Better Incubation Contest.
- Winner Extreme Tech Challenge (XTC)
