= Murfie =

Defunct commercial music streaming service

- Company type: Private
- Industry: Music storage and streaming service
- Founded: 2011
- Founders: Preston Austin, Matt Younkle
- Defunct: 2019
- Fate: Ceased operations; assets acquired
- Headquarters: Madison, Wisconsin, United States
- Products: CD and vinyl digitization and streaming

Murfie was a commercial music streaming service based initially in Madison, Wisconsin. Its members bought, sold, and traded compact discs and streamed or downloaded their contents. Additionally, members could digitize and store CDs and LPs they sent from home to Murfie. Murfie was featured in The Wall Street Journal, The New York Times, Fast Company, Time magazine, and National Public Radio.

Preston Austin and Matt Younkle co-founded the company. In 2012, Murfie became a member of startup accelerator and venture capital firm Techstars. In 2014, the company announced they had lossless FLAC streaming available on Sonos devices.

Younkle left in 2015, and Rex Mangat, company CEO, departed in September 2019, shortly before the company ceased operations in November 2019. When Murfie shut down, disks were not returned to customers.

In January 2020, Crossies LLC acquired the site's assets, making its owner John Fenley the owner of Murfie as well. Crossies committed to returning collections to those who had entrusted the Madison company with their music. Of the 750,000 discs held by Crossies, requests were received for only about 150,000.
