= Brad Feld =

American entrepreneur blogger (born 1965)

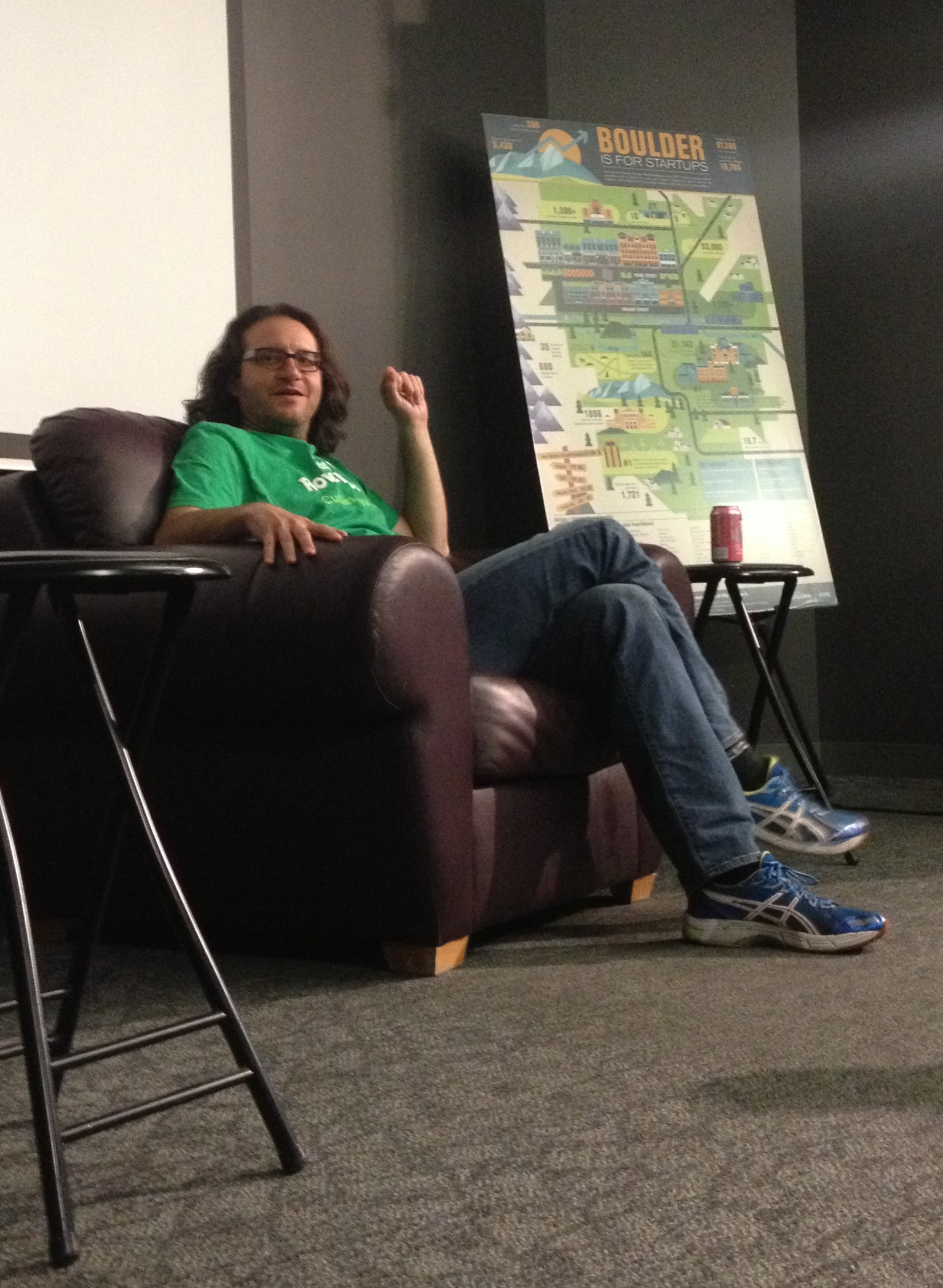
- Education: MIT
- Occupations: Venture capitalist, author
- Spouse: Amy Batchelor

Brad Feld (born December 1, 1965) is an American entrepreneur, author, blogger, and venture capitalist at Foundry Group in Boulder, Colorado, a firm he started with partners Seth Levine, Ryan McIntyre, and Jason Mendelson.

Feld began financing technology startups in the early 1990s, first as an angel and later an institutional investor. Feld was an early investor in Harmonix, Zynga, MakerBot, and Fitbit.

== Career ==
In 1987, Feld co-founded Feld Technologies, a custom software development startup which catered mostly to small and medium-sized businesses, while he was a student at MIT. In 1993, the company was acquired by AmeriData for around $2 million, where Feld took the role of chief technology officer. Prior to the acquisition, Feld Technologies had grown to a headcount of 20 employees and was doing just under $2 million in annual revenue.

In the late 1990s and early 2000s, Feld helped operate Interliant, an application service and hosting provider. Interliant failed in 2002, following the collapse of the dot-com bubble. Feld openly talks about his experience at Interliant, using it as an example of entrepreneurial failure.

In 2006, Feld helped David Cohen co-found Techstars, an early-stage venture fund and startup accelerator.

Before co-founding Foundry Group in 2007, Feld co-founded VC firms Intensity Ventures and Mobius Venture Capital. After its inaugural $225 million fund, Foundry Group has raised four more early-stage funds of $225 million each – in 2010, 2012, 2013, and 2016.

Foundry Group also raised a $225 million Select Fund in 2013 that invests in later-stage opportunities of their earlier stage funds. In 2016, they raised Foundry Next which is a $500 million fund investing in later-stage opportunities as well as investing in other venture firms.

Feld serves on the boards of nonprofits National Center for Women & Information Technology, Startup Colorado, Global EIR Program, and UP Global.

== Writing ==
Since 2005 Feld has been writing on Feld Thoughts, a technology venture blog.

Feld is the author and co-author of a series of books focused on entrepreneurship, technology venture capital, and startups in general. He is also a member of the Xconomists, an ad hoc team of editorial advisors for the tech news and media company Xconomy.

== Personal life ==
Feld was born in Arkansas and grew up in Dallas, Texas. In 1983, he moved to Cambridge, Massachusetts to attend MIT where he earned a bachelor's and master's degree in Management Science. Since 1995, he has lived in Boulder, Colorado with wife and co-author Amy Batchelor.

== Bibliography ==
- Do More Faster: TechStars Lessons to Accelerate Your Startup with David Cohen (2010)
- Venture Deals: Be Smarter Than Your Lawyer and Venture Capitalist with Jason Mendelson (2011)
- Burning Entrepreneur: How to Launch, Fund, and Set Your Startup On Fire (2012)
- Startup Communities: Building an Entrepreneurial Ecosystem in Your City (2012)
- Venture Deals: Be Smarter Than Your Lawyer and Venture Capitalist (Second Edition) with Jason Mendelson (2012)
- Startup Life: Surviving and Thriving in a Relationship with an Entrepreneur with Amy Batchelor (2013)
- Startup Boards: Getting the Most Out of Your board of directors with Mahendra Ramsinghani (2013)
- Startup Metrics: Making Sense of the Numbers in Your Startup with Seth Levine (2014)
- Startup Opportunities: Know When to Quit Your Day Job with Sean Wise (2015)
- Venture Deals: Be Smarter Than Your Lawyer and Venture Capitalist (Third Edition) with Jason Mendelson (2016)
- #GiveFirst: A New Philosophy for Business in The Era of Entrepreneurship
- Venture Deals: Be Smarter Than Your Lawyer and Venture Capitalist (Fourth Edition) with Jason Mendelson (2019)
- The Startup Community Way: Evolving an Entrepreneurial Ecosystem with Ian Hathaway (2020)
- The Entrepreneur's Weekly Nietzsche: A Book for Disruptors with Dave Jilk (2021)
