= Jonathan Mildenhall =

British businessman

- Born: September 9, 1967 (age 58); Leeds, England, U.K.
- Education: Manchester Metropolitan University
- Occupation: CMO of Rocket Companies

Jonathan Mildenhall (born September 9, 1967, Leeds, England) is the chief marketing officer of Rocket Companies. He is the former chief executive officer of TwentyFirstCenturyBrand, a marketing consultancy firm. While working for Airbnb in 2017, he was ranked 8th on the world's most influential CMOs by Forbes.

== Education ==
After graduating from John Smeaton Community High School in Leeds, England in 1985, he was admitted into Thomas Danby College, where he received a degree in advertising in 1988. At the age of 21, he went on to continue his studies at Manchester Metropolitan University, where he received his HND in Business and Finances management. In 2005, he furthered his studies by completing a course at Harvard Business School in Advance Management. In 2007, he was honored by his alma mater with an Honorary Doctorate in Business Administration, Business and Management.

== Career ==
In 1990, Mildenhall started working as an account manager at McCann Erickson, where he was one of the agency's first ethnic minority hires. In 1992, Mildenhall joined Bartle Bogle Hegarty, where he continued working until 1996 as account director. In 1999, Mildenhall became board account director at Lowe Howard-Spink. Between 1999 and 2000, he served as the head of account management at HHCL.

Mildenhall quickly rose in the London ad agency world, and joined the London office of TBWA Worldwide as managing director in 2000. In 2002, Mildenhall became co-chair of the Institute of Practitioners in Advertising to address issues of discrimination in the advertising industry. In 2005 Coca-Cola pulled him as vice president, Global Advertising Strategy and Creative. He was behind the global initiative “Open Happiness”, which led to the company's fastest profit increase in 20 years. The campaign came to be one of the most-awarded marketing platforms in the company's history. In 2014, Airbnb’s CEO Brian Chesky asked Mildenhall to join Airbnb as chief marketing officer.

During his time at Airbnb, he was responsible for the brand’s breakthrough global campaigns “Wall and Chain”, “Never A Stranger” and “Live There,” among others. In 2017, Airbnb launched its #WeAccept ad during Super Bowl LI, to promote its values of inclusiveness and diversity.

In October 2017, he left Airbnb to found TwentyFirstCenturyBrand, a marketing consultancy firm. In 2018, he said, "Brands that have properly understood culture, that know how to insert themselves into culture in a way that transcends the specific technology or product or service, they’re the brands that are going to be successful."

In 2024, Mildenhall became the chief marketing officer of Rocket Companies.

== Recognition ==
In 2017, Mildenhall was named Jury President for Creative Effectiveness of Cannes Lions International Festival of Creativity. The same year, Mildenhall was ranked 8th on Forbes’ "The World’s Most Influential CMOs 2017" and Financial Times included him in its ranking "EMpower 100 Ethnic Minority Leaders" lists. In 2016, he won Adweek’s Brand Genius award, and Business Insider recognized him as 7th on its list of "The 50 Most Innovative CMOs in the world". Mildenhall was awarded Creative Marketer of The Year by Cannes Lions International Festival of Creativity in 2013. Mildenhall served as a Trustee of HRH Prince of Wales’ The Prince's Trust from 2002 to 2005.

== Personal life ==
Mildenhall is openly gay, and has a husband. He also has a daughter and son.
