= Techstars =

U.S. startup accelerator

Techstars, LLC
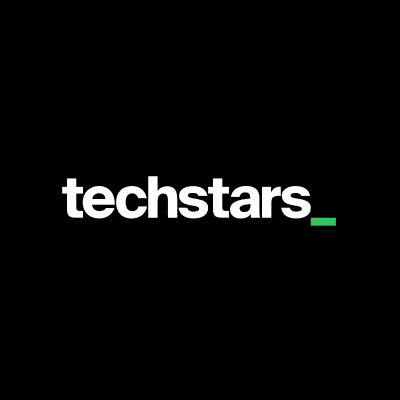
- Type: Private
- Industry: Startup accelerator
- Founded: Colorado, United States (2006, as Techstars, LLC.)
- Headquarters: New York City, New York
- Key people: David Cohen (Co-founder, Chairman, CEO); Brad Feld (Co-founder); Jared Polis (Co-founder)
- Products: Venture capital, investments
- Website: techstars.com

Techstars is an American startup accelerator and venture capital firm founded in 2006 and headquartered in New York City. The accelerator provides capital, mentorship, and other support for early-stage entrepreneurs.

== History ==
Techstars was founded in Boulder, Colorado, by David Cohen, Brad Feld, David Brown, and Jared Polis in 2006. Initially, Techstars invested between $6,000 and $18,000 in early stage companies, providing entrepreneurs with mentorship during a three month accelerator program.

The company held its first program in Boulder in 2007 with ten companies. Of the ten, two were acquired that same year. As of 2012, three had achieved positive exits and two were generating millions in annual revenue. In subsequent years, Techstars expanded to Boston, Seattle, New York City, a "cloud" program in San Antonio, and Austin.

In January 2011, Techstars launched the Global Accelerator Network (GAN), which links 22 similar programs internationally. The network was launched in conjunction with President Barack Obama's Startup America Partnership. GAN is now an independently operated organization. Techstars has also supported the formation of Patriot Boot Camp.

In 2017, Techstars partnered with the venture capital firm Partech Ventures to expand its program to Paris, and in September of the same year was contracted to work with AFWERX, the United States Air Force's new technology accelerator. At the beginning of 2019 Techstars started another European program around smart cities in Amsterdam with their corporate partner Arcadis. In 2021, Maëlle Gavet became CEO. In 2017 Techstars became the first US accelerator to build an office in the UAE.

In 2022 Techstars expanded its work into Africa. In 2022, Techstars and J.P. Morgan raised $80 million to invest in over 400 companies through 2024; the fund focuses on underrepresented entrepreneurs.

In December 2023, the group announced it would pause its Austin operation. Just a few months later, in February 2024, Techstars announced that it would be moving its headquarters from Boulder to New York, where its CEO lives, and closing the Boulder and Seattle accelerators. The decision was criticized by a former Seattle staffer and others in the startup community. Techstars Seattle was one of the first accelerators to emerge from the Techstars program. The decision to close it was made as the accelerator shifts its focus to cities with more VC activity.

In May 2024, Gavet announced her resignation and that Cohen would return as CEO.

== Programs ==
Techstars admits approximately 1-2% of applicants, typically selecting 12 companies per cohort. Admission is determined by the program’s Managing Director, along with a screening committee consisting of members from the Techstars network.

In exchange for 6% common stock, each company accepted into Techstars receives $220,000 in funding. Participants also gain access to the Techstars network and receive benefits valued at over $5 million, which include $100,000 in AWS credits. The accelerator program spans three months and is divided into three phases: mentorship, growth, and investment.

== Notable alumni companies ==
- Uber
- Bench
- Digital Ocean
- FullContact
- Graphic.ly
- IntenseDebate
- Mocavo
- Murfie
- Next Big Sound
- Orbotix (Sphero)
- Outreach
- Plated
- Rheaply
- SendGrid
- Simple Energy
- Sketchfab
- Socialthing
- Zagster
- Salubata
- Telnyx
