= Socialthing =

Socialthing was a social news aggregator that founded in 2007 and was acquired by AOL the following year for an undisclosed sum. Later renamed AOL Lifestream, the service was a central part of AOL's unsuccessful attempt to compete against upstart social networks such as Facebook.

== History ==
Socialthing was an early social aggregator that let users manage multiple social networking feeds from a single Web dashboard. The company was founded by Ben Brightwell, Brian DeWitt, and Matt Galligan, and was part of the inaugural TechStars startup accelerator program in Boulder in 2007. Socialthing launched a private beta with support for Facebook, Twitter, Flickr, Vimeo, Pownce, and LiveJournal in early 2008.

Socialthing differentiated itself from Friendfeed and other aggregators through the use of an algorithm that determined users' friends—at the time, competing services required users to define a list of friends for each service. CEO Matt Galligan described Socialthing's advantage to users as "simply just being able to see what all of your friends on all of your networks are doing without ever having to add them, and then being able to communicate with them, all without ever leaving the same site."

=== Acquisition ===
In August 2008, AOL confirmed that it had acquired Socialthing. The service was incorporated into AOL's People Network's division, which also managed AIM and Bebo, the social network AOL acquired for $850 million. The price AOL paid for Socialthing was not disclosed, but Venture Capital Journal listed the acquisition as #2 in its list of “Top M&A Returns for VC-backed Internet Companies” in 2008.

By mid-2009, Socialthing had evolved into AOL's social toolbar. It let users sign in with AIM, Bebo, or ICQ credentials and chat with friends from the toolbar, even as other sites were being visited from the browser.

In 2010, Socialthing was rebranded as AOL Lifestream. By that time, AOL's acquisition-driven social strategy was struggling. The company reportedly sold Bebo to a hedge fund for just $10 million in mid-2010.

By this point, Galligan had left AOL to start SimpleGeo and Brightwell was working for another TechStars company, Occipital.

As of October 2013, the AOL Lifestream service is still active.
