= Xconomy =

Technology news website

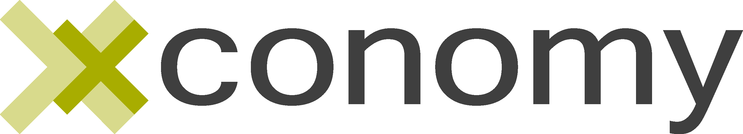
- Website type: Technology news & media company
- Available in: English
- Owner: Informa Connect
- Creators: Robert Buderi (founder) & Rebecca Zacks (co-founder)
- Editor: Robert Buderi
- Commercial: Yes
- Launched: 2007; 19 years ago

Xconomy was a media company providing news on business, life sciences, and technology focusing on the regions of Boston, Boulder/Denver, Detroit, New York City, Raleigh-Durham, San Diego, San Francisco and Seattle. The website was launched in June 2007 by founders Robert Buderi and Rebecca Zacks. Xconomy content covered "local personalities, companies, and technological trends to business and technology leaders" with a target audience of "entrepreneurs, business and technology executives and innovators, venture capitalists, angel investors, lawyers, and university researchers and officials." Bill Mitchell of the Poynter Institute described Xconomy in 2010 as reflecting "the insiderish feel of, say, Politico, but with some of the familiarity that you might expect from a small town paper."

== History ==
Xconomy was founded in 2007 in Cambridge, Massachusetts. The original Xconomy site focused on the city of Boston before opening another outlet in Seattle in 2008 and expanding to other key technology centers of activity afterward.

In 2016, Xconomy was acquired by Informa Connect and moved its headquarters to Boston.

Xconomy had webinar and podcasting services (Xconomy Xpertise) and formed a custom research and publishing arm (Xconomy Insight). Xconomy also provided "underwriting programs, banner ads, display ads, and ad networks".

== Contributors ==
Notable contributors to Xconomy include:

- David Baltimore – biologist and Nobel laureate
- Esther Dyson – journalist, author, businesswoman, investor, commentator, and philanthropist
- Brad Feld – entrepreneur, author, blogger, and venture capitalist
- Dean Kamen – engineer, inventor (e.g., Segway) and businessman (e.g., FIRST co-founder)
- Vinod Khosla – engineer and businessman (e.g., Sun Microsystems co-founder)
- Robert Langer – chemical engineer, scientist, entrepreneur and inventor
- Marc Tessier-Lavigne – neuroscientist, executive (e.g., Genentech) and Stanford University president
