= First National Building =

Skyscraper in downtown Detroit, Michigan, USA

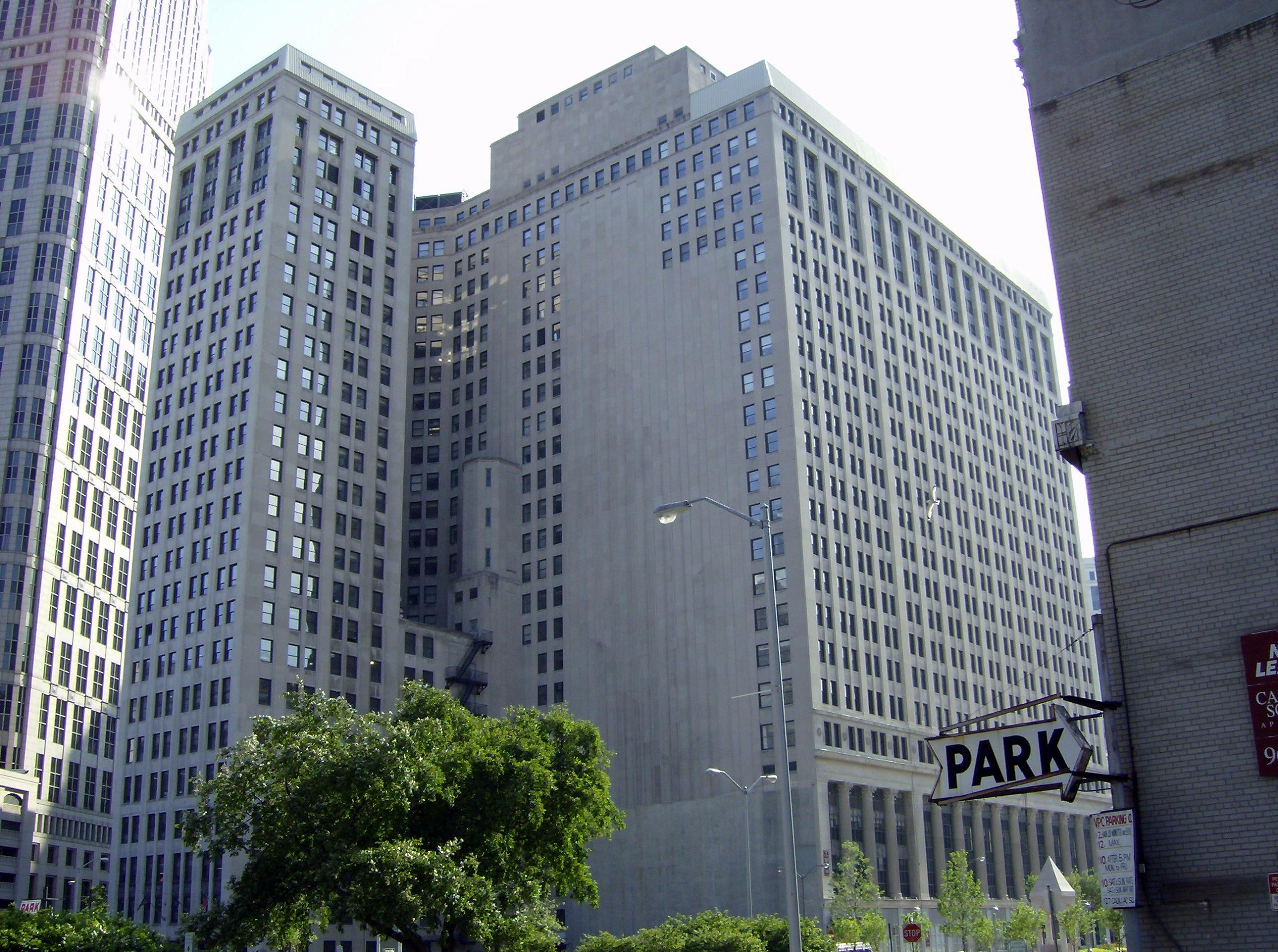
- Interactive map of the First National Building area

General information
- Type: Office
- Completed: 1922
- Owner: Bedrock Detroit

Height
- Antenna spire: 357 ft (109 m)
- Roof: 341 ft (104 m)
- Top floor: 336 ft (102 m)

Technical details
- Floor count: 26
- Floor area: 843,051 sq ft (78,322.0 m^{2})

Design and construction
- Architect: Albert Kahn
- First National Building
- U.S. Historic district – Contributing property
- Location: 660 Woodward Avenue; Detroit, Michigan
- Coordinates: 42°19′51.7″N 83°2′45.2″W
- Part of: Detroit Financial District (ID09001067)
- Designated CP: December 14, 2009

The First National Building is a high-rise office building in Downtown Detroit, Michigan, within the Detroit Financial District. The building is located across the streets from Cadillac Tower and One Detroit Center, and stands next to the Vinton Building.

== Description ==
Built between 1921 and 1930, the building rises 26 stories and includes two basement levels, occupying an entire block along Cadillac Square (adjacent to Campus Martius Park). It is 341 feet (104 m) tall. The structure has an unusual "Z" shape, designed so that most offices would have natural light and ventilation.

The building, designed by Albert Kahn in the Neoclassical architectural style, was constructed primarily with limestone. Three-story Corinthian columns surround the building at the second floor. The space behind the columns originally housed the main banking hall; however, this space was divided for offices during a renovation. The building also houses a parking garage in the South East tower, which is accessible from Bates Street. The original cornice was removed in the late 1970s, and the parapet of the building covered with corrugated aluminum.

The first floor of the building houses retail space, while the upper floors were designed as commercial offices. Rock Ventures is a major tenant in the building's commercial offices, with Amrock being a primary tenant on most floors.

== Gallery ==
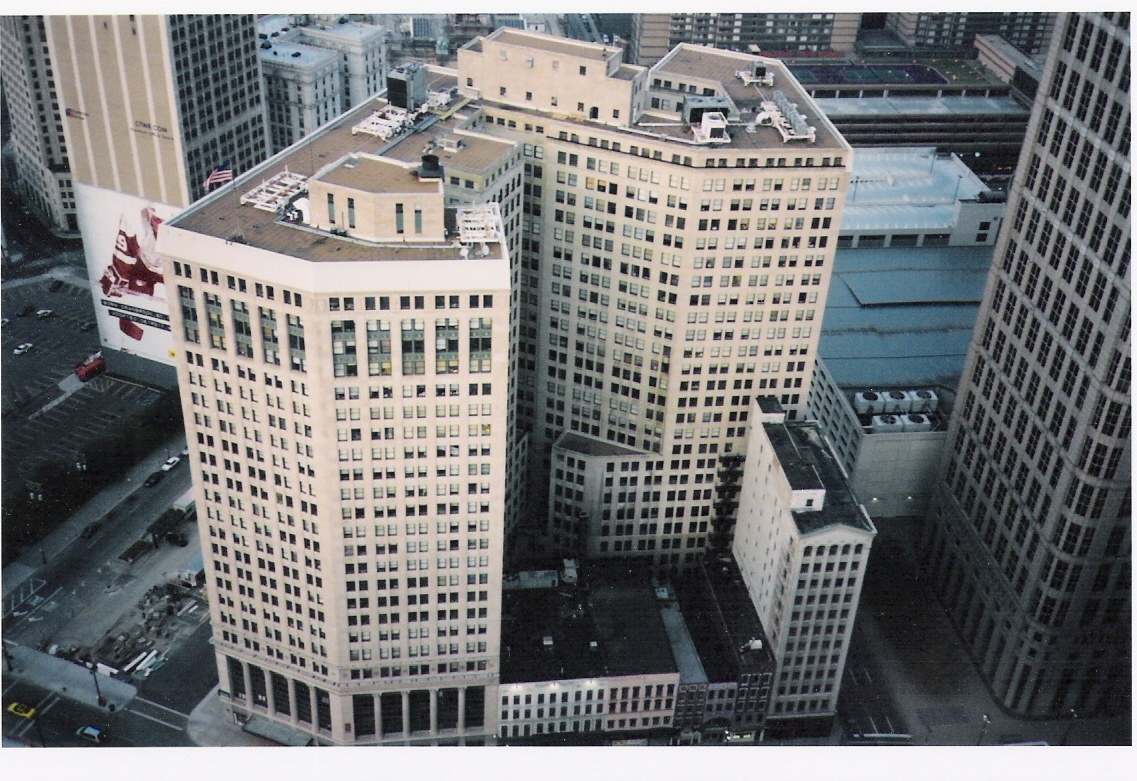
View looking east across Woodward Avenue; the Mabley and Company Buildings and Vinton Building are at the right

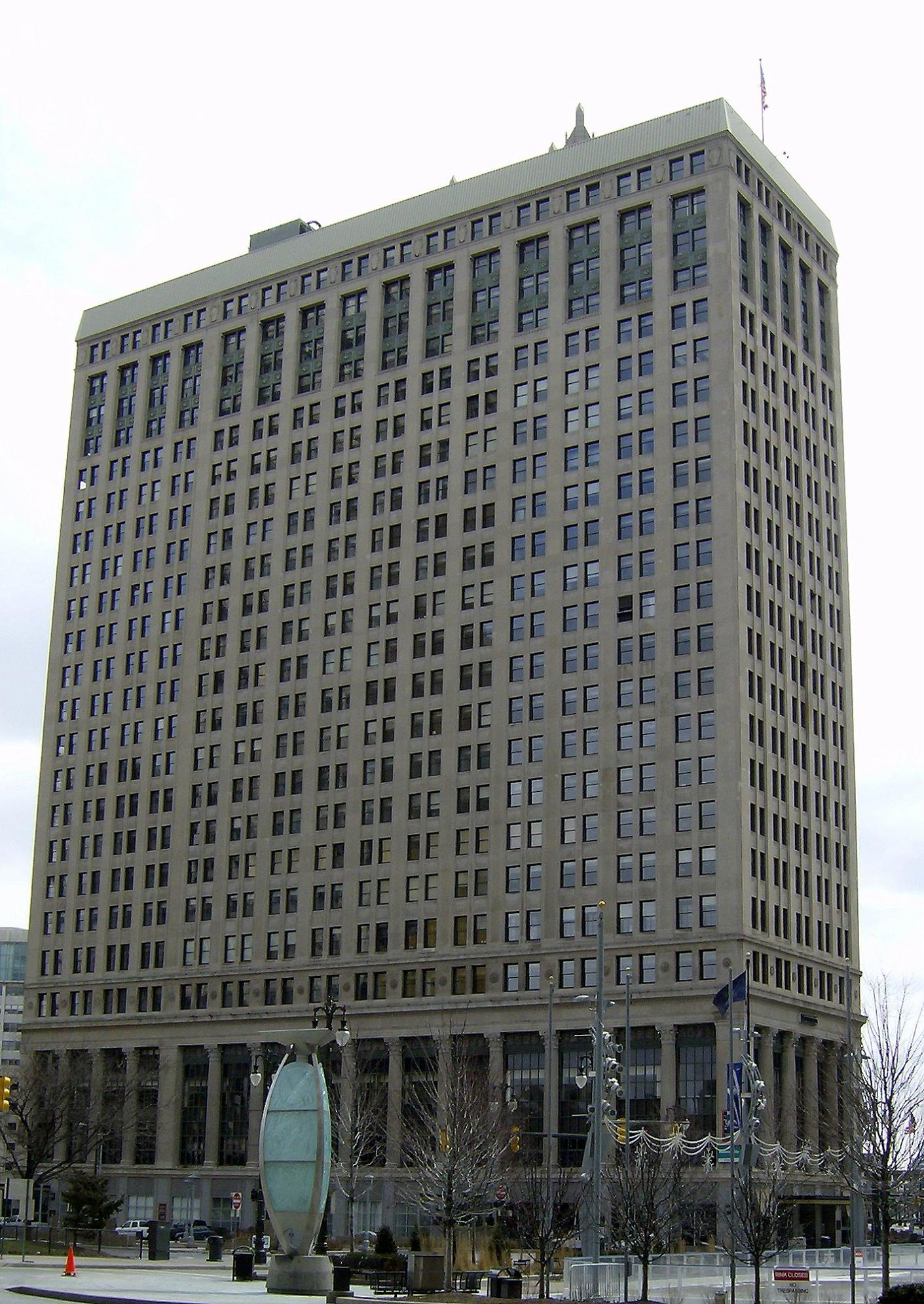
View from Campus Martius

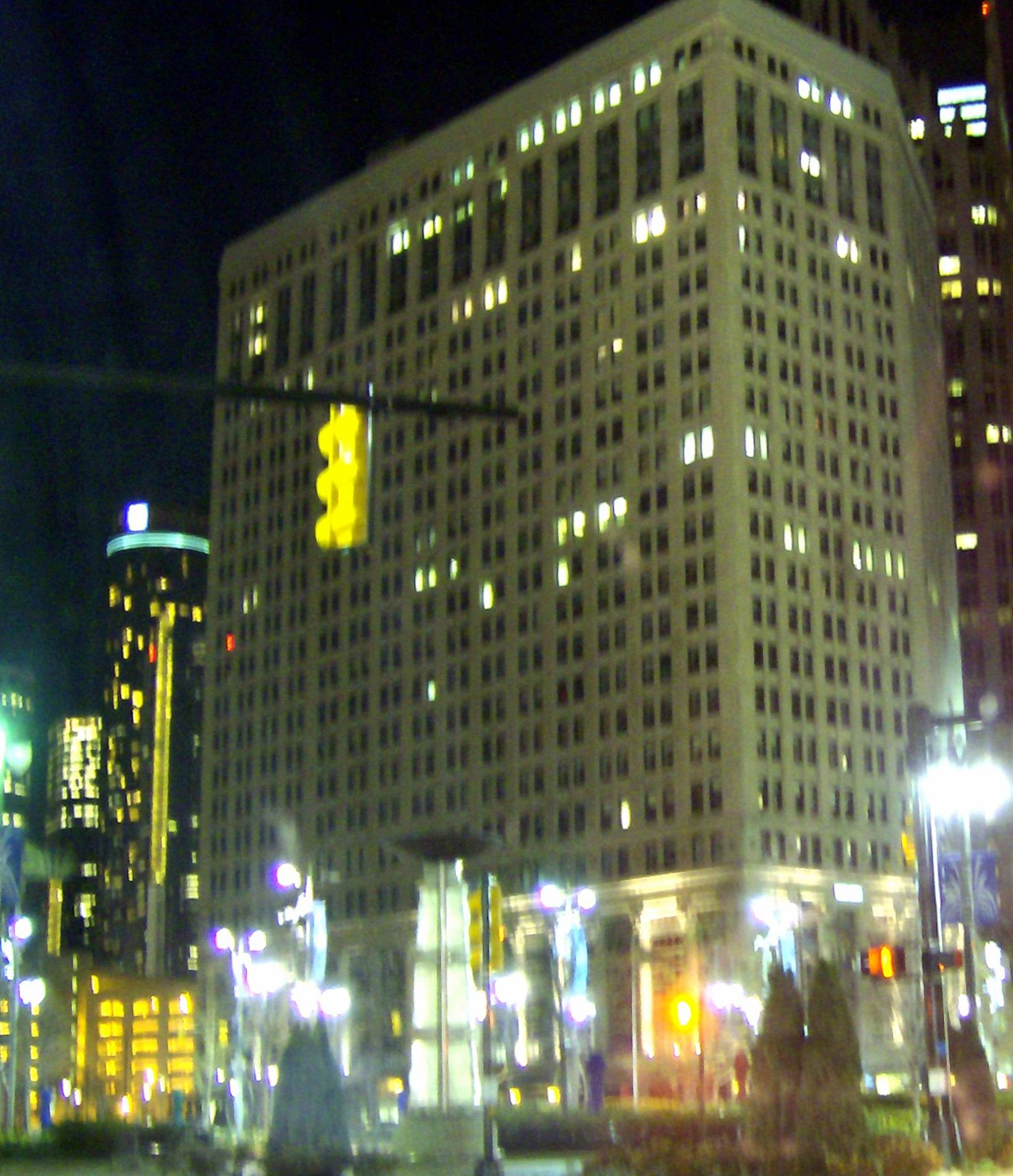
View from Campus Martius at night

== See also ==
- List of tallest buildings in Detroit
