= Bench Accounting =

North American financial technology company purchased by Employer.com

Bench Accounting, Inc.
- Type: Subsidiary
- Industry: Bookkeeping, Tax return preparation
- Founded: 2012
- Headquarters: San Francisco, California, United States
- Area served: United States of America, Canada
- Key people: Jesse Tinsley (CEO, President, Chairman); Ben Van Every (CTO); Ross Shanken (VP Growth)
- Parent: Employer.com
- Website: bench.co

Bench Accounting (branded as Bench) is a fintech company that uses proprietary software to automate bookkeeping and provide financial statements for small business owners. The company provides subscription access to cloud-based software in combination with in-house bookkeepers.

As of December 2024, Bench employed approximately 650 people and was headquartered in Vancouver, British Columbia, and had raised over $100 million in venture funding. However, in December 2024, Bench abruptly shut down without advance notice to employees.

Then, in January 2025, Bench Accounting filed for bankruptcy in Canada, revealing debts of over $65 million. After shutting down in December 2024, Bench Accounting was acquired by Employer.com, an HR tech company that previously did not specialize in accounting, and subsequently resumed operations in January 2025, operating under the Bench Accounting brand. Following the acquisition, Bench’s operations were integrated with Employer.com, which is headquartered in San Francisco.

== History ==
Bench was founded in 2012 under the name "10sheet Inc." and was accepted into the TechStars NYC accelerator program that same year. The company rebranded as "Bench" in 2013 after relocating to Vancouver, British Columbia, and publicly launched its product.

Over the years, Bench secured multiple rounds of venture funding and expanded its services. By 2021, the company introduced "Bench Banking," integrating financial services with its core bookkeeping offerings.

== Funding ==
Bench launched with a $2 million seed round in 2013, followed by $7 million Series A funding in 2015 led by Altos Ventures and Contour Venture Partners. In January 2014, Bench raised an additional $1 million from VCs and angel investors.

In 2016, the company raised $16 million in Series B funding, led by Bain Capital Ventures, with participation from Altos Ventures and Contour Venture Partners.

This was followed in 2018 by $18 million in Series B-1 funding led by iNovia Capital, alongside existing investors Bain Capital Ventures, Altos Ventures, and Silicon Valley Bank.

In 2021, Bench secured $60 million in Series C funding led by Contour Venture Partners, allowing the company to expand its offerings to include integrated banking services. The company's total funding exceeded $100 million as of December 2024. However, as of the end of 2024, Bench Accounting defaulted on over $65 million in debt, ultimately filing for bankruptcy in Canada on January 7, 2025.

== Product ==
=== Features and Integrations ===
Bench is available on desktop and iOS mobile app. Bench's core product is online bookkeeping software paired with in-house bookkeepers. Services include historical and monthly bookkeeping, cash flow and expense tracking, and financial reporting. Bench Bookkeeping also integrates with several other third-party apps including Stripe, Square, and PayPal.

In June 2019, Bench launched a new cash flow management tool called Pulse. As of August 2019, Bench announced BenchTax in partnership with Taxfyle in order to provide tax preparation and filing for clients.

== Bankruptcy and Acquisition ==
On December 27, 2024, Bench Accounting emailed its customers and posted a notice on its website stating that the platform would be immediately inaccessible. Soon after, Bench Accounting filed for bankruptcy. On December 30, 2024, it was announced that Bench would be acquired by Employer.com.

Following its acquisition in December 2024, Bench Accounting resumed operations in January 2025 as a subsidiary of Employer.com. Following its acquisition, Bench’s services were integrated into Employer.com’s broader back-office solutions portfolio alongside Mainstreet’s offerings.

== See also ==
- Accounting software
- Square
- Stripe
- Shopify
- Gusto
- FreshBooks
- MINDBODY
