= Rocket Close =

Real estate company

- Company type: Subsidiary
- Industry: Insurance, real estate Title insurance Real estate services Real estate appraisal
- Headquarters: Detroit, Michigan
- Key people: Jeff Eisenshtadt (founder); Nicole Beattie (CEO)
- Parent: Rocket Companies
- Website: rocketclose.com

Rocket Close, formerly Amrock LLC and Title Source, Inc., is an American provider of title insurance property valuation and settlement services. It is a wholly owned subsidiary of Rocket Mortgage, headquartered in Detroit, Michigan.

== History ==
The company was founded in 1997 through the acquisition of Campbell Title Insurance Company of Michigan, a small agency in southeast Michigan. After rebranding to Title Source, the company embarked on a rapid expansion plan into all 50 states, offering title and settlement services and products that integrated and streamlined the entire mortgage process. In 1999, software maker Intuit purchased the company in connection with its acquisition of Rock Financial. Its then CEO, Jeff Eisenshtadt, stayed on and led the company’s continued expansion of services and geographic coverage. Three years later, he became part of a small group of private investors that repurchased the company from Intuit.

In 2018, the company rebranded from Title Source to Amrock. In 2020, Amrock’s parent company, Rocket Companies, went public on the New York Stock Exchange. In 2025, they rebranded from Amrock to Rocket Close.

=== Trade secrets lawsuit ===
In April 2016, Amrock filed a lawsuit against the San Francisco-based analytics company HouseCanary, Inc. over a 2015 licensing deal for real estate appraisal software and misappropriation of trade secrets. The Texas jury ruled in HouseCanary's favor in March 2018.

In July, Amrock claimed to have evidence of fraud committed by HouseCanary, provided by former employees of the firm, and sought to have the approximately $706 million verdict to be overturned by a judge.

Amrock's appeal was in response to HouseCanary's request for a temporary restraining order to stop Amrock from communicating with current and former employees of HouseCanary. Amrock's request was denied in October, and the company was ordered to pay approximately $740 million.

The trade secrets case was one of the largest in U.S. history, and the jury verdict was the largest in the history of Bexar County, Texas.

HouseCanary has since filed a lawsuit against Quicken Loans. In December 2018, four former HouseCanary employees testified in a hearing for a potential new trial in state court, supporting Amrock's claim that HouseCanary delivered nonfunctioning technology, and alleging collusion with an Amrock employee. HouseCanary's lawyers said each of the former employees had conflicts of interest, and in January 2019 a judge denied Amrock's request for a new trial. In June 2020, a Texas appellate court reversed the jury’s verdict because of flaws with the jury charges.
