= Rocket Companies =

American fintech, mortgage lending, and real estate parent company

Rocket Companies, Inc.
- Type: Public
- Traded as: NYSE: RKT (Class A); Russell 1000 component
- Industry: Financial technology; Mortgage lending; Real estate
- Founder: Dan Gilbert
- Headquarters: One Campus Martius, Detroit, Michigan, U.S.
- Areas served: United States; Canada
- Key people: Dan Gilbert (chairman); Varun Krishna (CEO); Bill Emerson (president); Jonathan Mildenhall (CMO); Brian Brown (CFO); Heather Lovier (COO)
- Revenue: ▲US$5.10 billion (2024)
- Operating income: ▲US$255 million (2024)
- Net income: ▲US$29.4 million (2024)
- Total assets: ▲US$24.5 billion (2024)
- Total equity: ▲US$9.04 billion (2024)
- Owner: Rock Holdings (93%)
- Number of employees: 14,200 (2024)
- Website: rocketcompanies.com

Rocket Companies, Inc., is an American fintech and homeownership services company. Founded by Dan Gilbert and based in Downtown Detroit, Michigan, the company is one of the largest mortgage lenders in the United States through its flagship subsidiary Rocket Mortgage (formerly known as Quicken Loans). Its subsidiaries include Redfin, Forsalebyowner.com, and Rocket Money.

== History ==
In 1985, Dan Gilbert founded Rock Financial, the company that would become Rocket Mortgage – the first of the Rocket Companies, in Metro Detroit.

In 1999, Rock Financial changed its name to Quicken Loans.

In 2020, Quicken Loans and several other tech-driven real estate and personal finance entities including Rocket Homes, Rocket Loans and Rocket Close became a publicly traded company under the name Rocket Companies. The company raised $1.8 billion in the initial public offering.

Following its transition to a public company in 2020, Jay Farner served as the company's vice chairman and CEO. Farner, who joined the organization in 1996, had previously served as CEO of Quicken Loans and oversaw the 2015 launch of the Rocket Mortgage platform. In February 2023, Farner announced his retirement from the company and the board of directors. He was succeeded by Bill Emerson as interim CEO, followed by the appointment of Varun Krishna as the permanent CEO in September 2023.

In 2021, Rocket Community Fund, the philanthropic partner company of Rocket Companies, announced an investment of $500 million in Detroit to be spent over the course of 10 years. That same year, they gave $5 million to the Rehabbed & Ready program which rehabilitates homes in Detroit and helps residents access financing for homeownership.

In 2023, Rocket Companies launched ONE+, a program that offers home loans for 1% down in an aim to provide lower income Americans with greater access to homeownership. That same year, the company announced that its team members, along with those from partner companies, have spent 1 million hours volunteering in the community.

Rocket Companies hired Jonathan Mildenhall as its first chief marketing officer and Shawn Malhotra as the company’s first chief technology officer in 2024. Malhotra focused on integrating AI into the homebuying process. The company developed Rocket Logic, an artificial intelligence (AI) platform designed to simplify the road to homeownership.

Rocket Companies was a meme stock in 2021 and in 2025, when traders began promoting it as one of the DORKs, an acronym that refers to Krispy Kreme (Donuts), Opendoor, Rocket, and Kohl's.

The Rocket Companies website, Rocket.com website, launched in 2025, contains finance and management tools aimed at streamlining the process of buying and selling a home. The site includes an AI agent that assists the client in collecting data from mortgage documents, completing forms, and correcting errors which may delay a mortgage’s approval. This automation has helped Rocket customers secure loans 2.5 times faster than the industry average.

In 2025, the company's Super Bowl LIX ad included a live sing-along to the song "Take Me Home, Country Roads", focusing on the American dream of homeownership.

In 2025, Rocket Companies announced agreements to acquire Mr. Cooper Group, America’s largest mortgage servicer, and Redfin, one of the largest real estate brokerages in the county.

== Subsidiaries ==
1. Rocket Mortgage: Rocket Mortgage is the largest mortgage lender in the United States. It offers a fully online mortgage process.
2. Rocket Money: Rocket Money is a budgeting app that links to users' bank accounts to help track income and spending. The app includes features such as subscription cancellation and bill negotiation.
3. Rocket Homes: Rocket Homes is a real estate search platform which offers maps of nearby listings, referrals to real estate agents, and virtual reality tours of properties.
4. Rocket Close: Rocket Close, formerly known as Amrock, is a title producer, settlement provider and appraisal management company.
5. Rocket Loans: Rocket Loans is an online personal loan company which features an online application with same-day funding.
6. Rocket Title Insurance Company: Formerly known as Amrock Title Insurance Company, Rocket Title Insurance Company is a nationwide title insurer.
7. Forsalebyowner.com: ForSaleByOwner.com is a real estate classified advertising site which enables homeowners to buy and sell properties on their own under the for sale by owner home purchasing model. Founded in 1999, Rocket acquired the site in 2018 from Tribune Publishing (which bought the site in 2006).
8. Core Digital Media: Core Digital Media is an advertiser in the mortgage and insurance world.
9. Lowermybills.com: Lowermybills.com provides comparisons for mortgages, reverse mortgages, refinancing, loans and insurance.
10. Lendesk:Based in Vancouver, LenDesk is a technology company that offers a suite of products to digitize the home loan experience for Canadian mortgage brokers and their clients.
11. Mr. Cooper Group :American home loan servicer headquartered in the Dallas, Texas area.
12. Rocket Innovation Studio: Rocket Innovation Studio, based in Windsor, Ontario, recruits Canadian talent to develop technology solutions for Rocket Companies.
13. Woodward Capital Management: Woodward Capital Management is a firm which specializes in private label mortgage-backed securities.
14. Redfin: Redfin is a real estate brokerage and technology company that operates an online platform and provides brokerage services for buying, selling, and renting homes.
