= Telnyx =

American telecommunications and cloud computing company

- Type: Private
- Industry: VOIP telephony and edge computing
- Founded: Chicago, Illinois United States (2009)
- Headquarters: Austin, Texas
- Key people: David Casem; Ian Reither
- Website: telnyx.com

Telnyx is an American telecommunications and cloud computing company headquartered in Austin, Texas. It was founded in Chicago, Illinois in 2009. The company operates as a licensed telecommunications carrier. It provides developer tools and private network infrastructure for voice calls, text messaging, email, wireless connectivity, and real-time artificial intelligence (AI) processing.

== History ==
Telnyx was founded in 2009 by David Casem and Ian Reither in Chicago, Illinois. Initially a call-center consulting firm, Telnyx transitioned into wholesale voice reselling and call-routing software development before becoming a licensed telecommunications carrier.

In May 2014, Telnyx graduated from the Techstars Chicago startup accelerator with $118,000 in funding. By November 2014, the company closed a $2.1 million seed round led by Pritzker Group Venture Capital, with participation from Chicago Ventures, Corazon Capital, Math Venture Partners, and Mike Gamson. Telnyx set up its corporate headquarters in the River North neighborhood of Chicago soon thereafter.

Telnyx started expanding internationally in 2016 with an office and network operations center in Dublin, Ireland. This was followed by further expansion in San Francisco, California, and Sydney, Australia. After the firm became a licensed carrier overseen by the Federal Communications Commission (FCC) in the United States, Telnyx executives joined regulatory advisory bodies, including the FCC's North American Numbering Council (NANC).

In February 2025, the FCC proposed a $4.5 million penalty against Telnyx for alleged "Know Your Customer" (KYC) violations following fraudulent robocalls placed via its network. Telnyx successfully contested the action by noting that it had terminated the accounts within hours and self-reported the incident. Telnyx was reinstated to the Industry Traceback Group in April 2025.

In July 2026, Telnyx joined twenty-four other technology companies and organizations, including Microsoft, Meta, and Nvidia, in signing an open letter opposing regulation of open-weight AI models.

Following shifts in artificial intelligence provider API pricing structures in 2026, Telnyx transitioned its AI agent infrastructure to a multi-model architecture. It uses open-weight models for execution while pairing them with proprietary frontier models for high-level planning and review. Internally, the company deployed 1,400 autonomous AI agents supervised by its 150-person engineering team.

== Infrastructure ==
Telnyx operates a private global network linking dozens of data centers to bypass the public internet. For conversational AI, Telnyx colocates GPU clusters for edge compute with telephony infrastructure. This is intended to keep round-trip response times for speech recognition, large language models, and speech synthesis low enough for real-time use.
