= Robert Buderi =

American journalist, author, and editor

- Born: 1959 (age 66–67); Berkeley, California
- Education: UC Davis (B.A. 1977); University of Arizona (M.A. 1978)
- Occupations: journalist, author
- Known for: Editor of MIT Technology Review

Robert Buderi is an American journalist, author, and editor.

== Career ==
Buderi served as technology editor of BusinessWeek from 1990 to 1992 and editor-in-chief of MIT's Technology Review from 2002 to 2004. He was a research fellow at MIT's Center for International Studies from 2005 to 2007. In 2007, he founded Xconomy, a national business and technology news and media website based in Boston, for which he served as CEO and editor-in-chief. Buderi stepped down from Xconomy at the end of 2018, a little over two years after it was sold to Informa Connect, a publicly traded British firm. He remained chairman until the fall of 2019 and also served as chairman of LeadingBiotech, another Informa company, until October 2020.

From October 2018 through July 2019, Buderi served as president of the World Frontiers Forum, a non-profit established by scientist and inventor David Edwards (engineer), MIT professor and Moderna co-founder Robert S. Langer, and Dennis Ausiello, longtime chief of medicine for Massachusetts General Hospital. Buderi also served as an inaugural member of The MIT Future Founders Initiative, which was announced in 2021 and seeks to increase the rate of company formation among women faculty.

Buderi's first book, The Invention that Changed the World: How a Small Group of Radar Pioneers Won the Second World War and Launched a Technological Revolution was published in 1996 by Simon and Schuster. The book covers the development of radar technology in the United States during World War II and details how this technology determined the outcome of important battles. It argues that radar technology changed the course of the war and eventually led to Allied victory. It also covers how radar technology led to major innovations in the aftermath of World War II in fields such as electronics, space exploration, nuclear magnetic resonance, lasers, and computer networking.

Buderi’s fifth book, Where Futures Converge: Kendall Square and the Making of a Global Innovation Hub, was published by MIT Press in May 2022. It covers the history of Cambridge, Massachusetts' Kendall Square from the 1600s until the present day. It won the 2023 New England Society Award for contemporary non-fiction.

== Early life and education ==
Born in Berkeley, CA, Buderi attended the University of California, Berkeley and received his bachelor's degree from the University of California, Davis in 1977. In 1978, he earned a master's degree in journalism from the University of Arizona. In the 1986–87 academic year, he was a Knight Science Journalism Fellow at MIT (formerly known as a Vannevar Bush Fellow).

From January 2005 through June 2007 he was a Research Fellow at the MIT Center for International Studies.

== Bibliography ==
- The Invention that Changed the World: How a Small Group of Radar Pioneers Won the Second World War and Launched a Technological Revolution (Simon and Schuster, 1996)
- Engines of Tomorrow: How the World's Best Companies Are Using Their Research Labs to Win the Future (Simon and Schuster, 2000)
- Guanxi (The Art of Relationships): Microsoft, China, and the Plan to Win the Road Ahead (with Gregory T. Huang, Simon and Schuster, 2006)
- Naval Innovation for the 21st Century: The Office of Naval Research Since the End of the Cold War (Naval Institute Press, 2013)
- Where Futures Converge: Kendall Square and the Making of a Global Innovation Hub (MIT Press, 2022)
