= Fathead (brand) =

Brand

Fathead, LLC
- Company type: Private
- Website type: E-commerce
- Available in: English
- Founded: June 6, 2006; 20 years ago
- Headquarters: Detroit, Michigan, U.S.
- Area served: Worldwide
- Founder: Steve Warshak
- Key people: Chris Hetherington (CEO); Jason Turner (COO); Jen Beaver(CPO); Mehul J.D. (CTO)
- Industry: Online shopping
- Products: Lifesized Wall Graphics
- Website: fathead.com

Fathead is a brand name of life-sized, precision-cut vinyl wall graphics manufactured by Fathead LLC. Fathead LLC is a privately held company based in Los Angeles. The ownership group is led by Chris Hetherington.

== History ==
In 2023, Fathead was acquired by a group of former athletes, led by Chris Hetherington. In 2006, a group of investors headed by Dan Gilbert, founder of Quicken Loans, purchased Fathead, Inc. Fathead was brought to Gilbert's attention by the company's president Todd Lunsford, then Quicken Loans’ Chief Marketing Officer, after Lunsford's son saw a commercial and wanted to order a Tom Brady Fathead.

Fathead, LLC is a major company in a large family of properties in the sports and entertainment market including the NBA's Cleveland Cavaliers, the American Hockey League's Cleveland Monsters, Quicken Loans Arena now Rocket Arena, Xenith, Xeko, and Veritix.

== Products ==
The products Fathead makes are high-definition wall graphics of professional athletes, animated heroes, entertainment characters, team helmets and logos. The graphics are constructed of vinyl with a low-tack adhesive.
