= David Cohen (entrepreneur) =

American businessperson (born 1968)

David G. Cohen
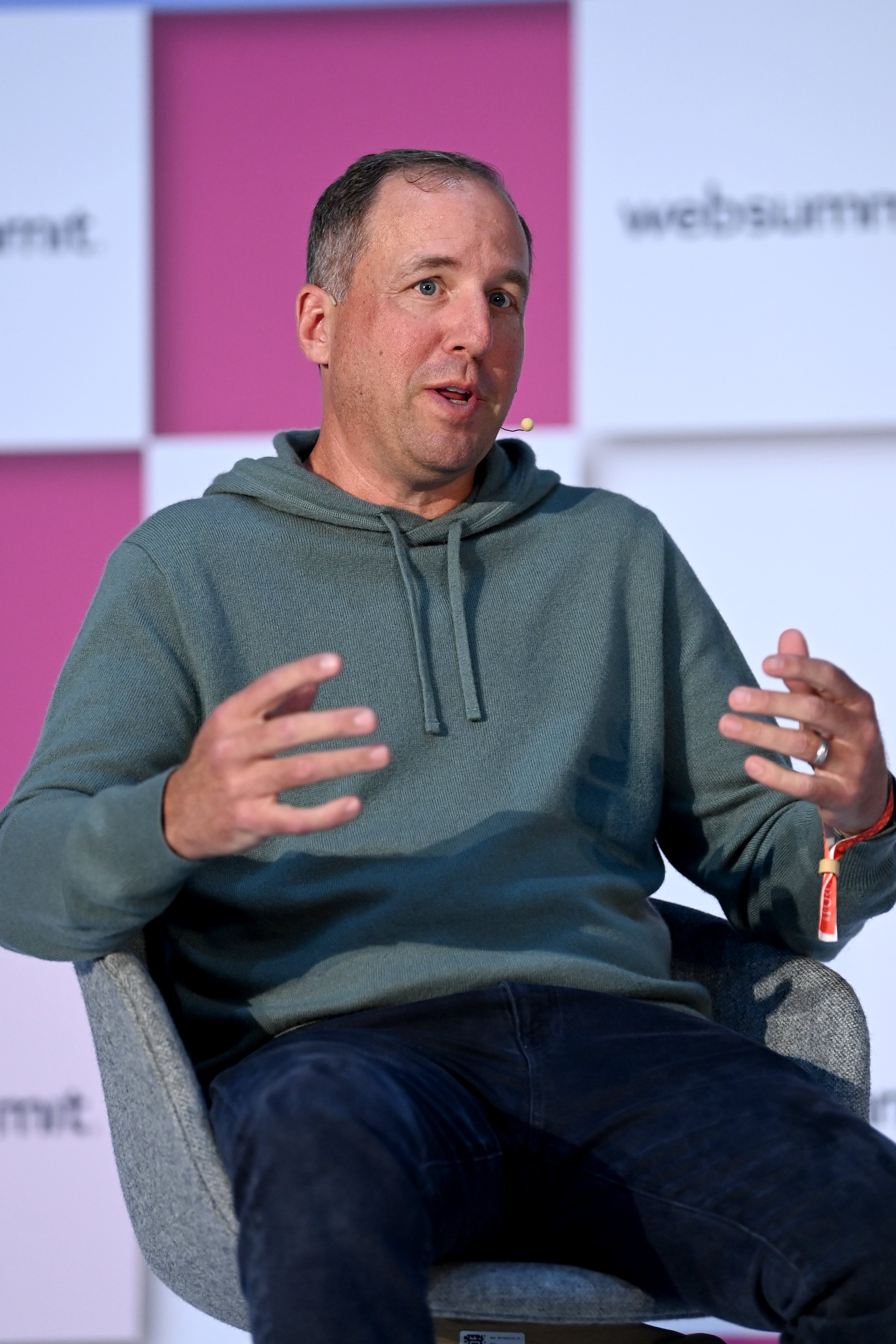
- Cohen in 2022
- Born: 1968 (age 57–58); DeLand, Florida
- Occupations: Founder and co-CEO, Techstars

David Cohen (born 1968) is an American entrepreneur and the founder of Pinpoint Technologies, iContact.com, and Earfeeder. He is also an angel investor with a portfolio of more than 100 companies. Cohen is best known as the co-founder of Techstars, a mentorship-based startup accelerator.

He and Brad Feld co-authored Do More Faster: Techstars Lessons to Accelerate Your Startup.

== Early life and education ==
Cohen was born in 1968 in DeLand, FL.

== Early career ==
Cohen began working as a software engineer in 1991 when he became the Director of Development for Automated Dispatch Services, Inc., where he worked until 1994.

Cohen founded Pinpoint Technologies in 1993. He was its CTO and vice president of research and development. The company developed public safety and EMS dispatch vehicle software. Zoll Medical Corporation acquired Pinpoint Technologies in 1999. Cohen stayed with the company until 2004.

Cohen then founded iContact.com, a social networking service for mobile devices. It is now defunct. In 2006, Cohen founded the music service earFeeder.com. SonicSwap bought earFeeder.com in 2006.

== Techstars ==
Cohen is the founder and co-CEO of Techstars, a startup accelerator program he founded in 2006 with Brad Feld, Jared Polis, and David Brown. The first program ran in 2007. Cohen designed Techstars to improve the existing system of angel investing and to provide more support to startups. In a speech at the Future of Entrepreneurship Education Summit, Cohen said that he was particularly interested in improving the entrepreneurial ecosystem of Techstars' launch city, Boulder, Colorado. Now, Techstars has dozens of locations globally that accept new startups regularly.

The Techstars experience was turned into a reality TV show on Bloomberg TV. Techstars invests $118,000 in each of its program startups. The startups also receive mentorship and pitch opportunities during the program. Techstars accepts approximately 1% of applicants.

== Works ==
Cohen is the co-author of Do More Faster with Brad Feld. Do More Faster shares advice for first-time entrepreneurs from the Techstars program. It includes essays from other Techstars mentors and company founders.
