= Dan Gilbert =

American businessman (born 1962)

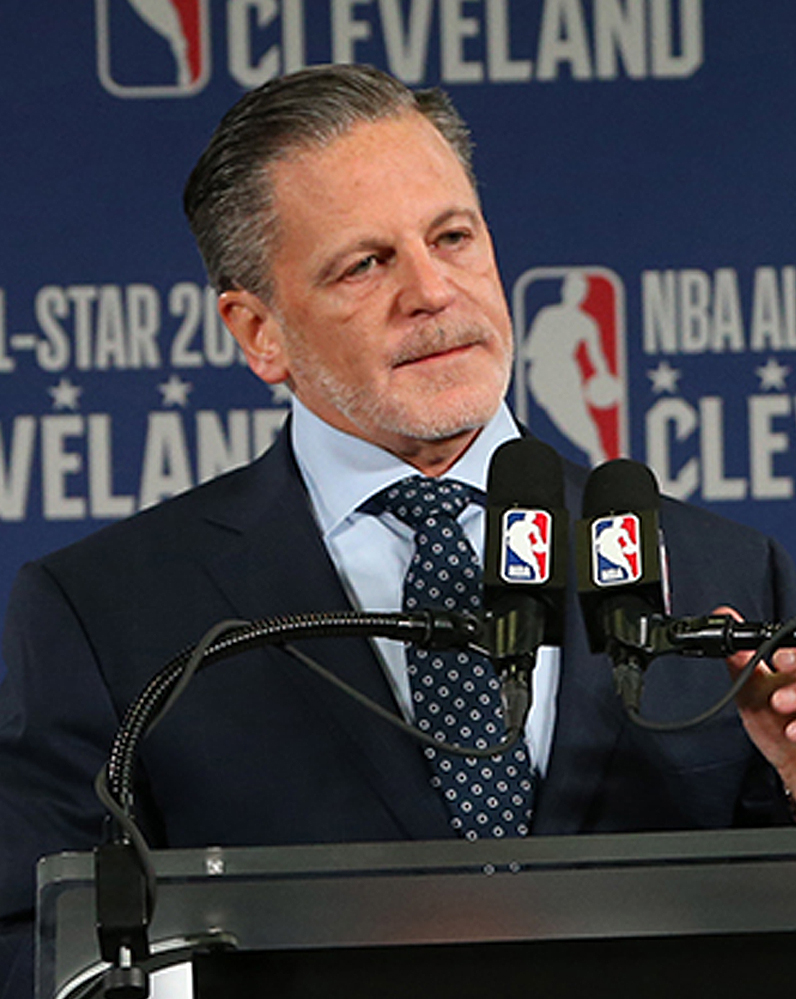
- Gilbert in 2022
- Born: Daniel Bruce Gilbert; January 17, 1962 (age 64); Detroit, Michigan, U.S.
- Education: Michigan State University (BA); Wayne State University (JD)
- Occupations: Co-founder and Chairman, Rocket Companies; Majority owner, Cleveland Cavaliers
- Spouse: Jennifer Gilbert
- Children: 5
- Relatives: Gary Gilbert (brother)

Daniel Bruce Gilbert (born January 17, 1962) is an American billionaire businessman and philanthropist. He is the co-founder, majority owner, and chairman of Rocket Mortgage, and founder of Rock Ventures. He is also well-known as the owner of the Cleveland Cavaliers of the National Basketball Association, the Cleveland Charge of the NBA G League, and the Cleveland Monsters of the American Hockey League. As of May 2025, Forbes estimated his net worth at US$19.9 billion, making him the 88th richest person in the world.

== Early life and education ==
Gilbert was born to a Jewish family in Detroit, Michigan.At age 12, Gilbert organized a pizza delivery service with children on bikes delivering in the neighborhood. He grew up in Southfield, Michigan, where he attended Southfield-Lathrup High School. While attending college he worked delivering pizzas. He earned his bachelor's degree from Michigan State University and a Juris Doctor from Wayne State University Law School, and he is a member of the State Bar of Michigan. While in college he earned a real estate agent's license, and while in law school, he worked part-time at his parents' Century 21 Real Estate agency.

== Business career ==
=== Rocket Mortgage ===
Gilbert founded Rock Financial in 1985 with Ron Berman, Lindsay Gross and his younger brother Gary Gilbert. In the late 1990s, the company launched its internet strategy, becoming an early online direct mortgage lender. In the fourth quarter of 2017, the company became the largest retail mortgage lender by volume in the United States.

In 2000, software maker Intuit Inc. purchased Rock Financial and renamed the national web operation Quicken Loans. In 2002, Gilbert and a group of private investors purchased Quicken Loans and its affiliated national title company, Title Source, Inc., from Intuit. As of 2021, Gilbert was the chairman of Quicken Loans, Inc.

In 2007, Gilbert and the city of Detroit announced an agreement to move the company's headquarters to downtown Detroit. All 3,600 Michigan-based employees moved into Detroit's urban core by the end of 2010.

In August 2020, Quicken Loans went public under the name Rocket Companies and made its debut on the New York Stock Exchange under the ticker symbol "RKT". As of 2020, Gilbert remained the majority owner, controlling 79% of the company's shares.

=== Sports franchise ownership ===
In 2005, Dan Gilbert bought the Cleveland Cavaliers for $375 million, which was then a record price for an NBA team. Since then, he has overseen significant improvements to the team's facilities.

In 2006, Gilbert also purchased the Cleveland Monsters, a professional ice hockey team in the American Hockey League. The team is affiliated with the NHL's Columbus Blue Jackets.

Gilbert has been an active and vocal owner, often speaking out on social media and in public about his teams and the NBA. He has also been involved in efforts to bring major sporting events to Cleveland, including the NBA All-Star Game and the NFL draft.

Gilbert's ownership of the Cavaliers has been marked by both success and controversy. The team won its first NBA championship in 2016, but also went through a tumultuous period after LeBron James left in 2018. Additionally, Gilbert has faced criticism for his treatment of former head coach David Blatt.

Overall, however, Dan Gilbert's ownership of the Cleveland Cavaliers and the Cleveland Monsters has been a significant part of his business and investment portfolio, and he remains a prominent figure in both the NBA and the city of Cleveland.

=== Other businesses and investments ===
Gilbert is a founding partner in the private equity group Rockbridge Growth Equity LLC (RBE). The partnership invests in growing businesses in the financial services, Internet technology, consumer-direct marketing, and the sports and entertainment industries.

RBE has significant investments in Gas Station TV, Robb Report, and RapidAdvance, among other ventures.

Gilbert is also an investor in Courtside Ventures, a venture capital fund investing across early-stage technology and media companies with a focus on sports and is a founding partner of Detroit Venture Partners (DVP), a venture capital firm that funds start-up and early-stage technology companies based primarily in Detroit.^{[23]} Some of the companies DVP has invested in includes CoverTree, Rivet and InvestNext.

Gilbert cofounded StockX, a stock market for high-demand, limited edition products such as sneakers. Gilbert is also invested and involved in the operation of several consumer-based technology-centered businesses, including Fathead, Veritix, Xenith, StyleCaster, and Quizzle.

Gilbert launched nonprofit Bizdom in 2007, which promotes both tech and brick-and-mortar entrepreneurship in Detroit and Cleveland by supporting on-the-ground service providers.

In November 2009, Gilbert and a group of partners successfully backed a statewide referendum to bring casino gaming to Ohio's four largest cities. Through a joint venture with Caesars Entertainment, the groups operate urban-based casinos in Cleveland and Cincinnati. The first of the casinos, Jack Cleveland Casino, opened in May 2012. In 2021, Dan Gilbert and his Family of Companies sold all interests in these casinos and, according to the Ohio Casino Control Commission, is no longer affiliated with Jack Entertainment.

In 2013, Rock Ventures, the umbrella entity for Gilbert's investments and real estate holdings, announced it had formed Athens Acquisition LLC, an affiliate of Rock Gaming, and acquired the majority interest in Greektown Superholdings Inc., owner of the Greektown Casino-Hotel located in downtown Detroit. In 2019, Dan Gilbert sold the Greektown Casino to Vici Properties.

In late 2018, Gilbert bought the online dictionaries Dictionary.com and Thesaurus.com, both of which were later sold to IXL Learning.

In November 2017, former professional Call of Duty player and 100 Thieves CEO Matthew "Nadeshot" Haag announced that Gilbert had made a multimillion-dollar investment into the esports organization.

=== City initiatives ===
==== Detroit ====
Quicken Loans, which changed its name to Rocket Mortgage, moved its headquarters and 1,700 of its employees to downtown Detroit in August 2010, where Gilbert and the company are helping lead a revitalization of Detroit's urban core. His initiative has led others, such as Ford Motor Company to invest millions into the city.

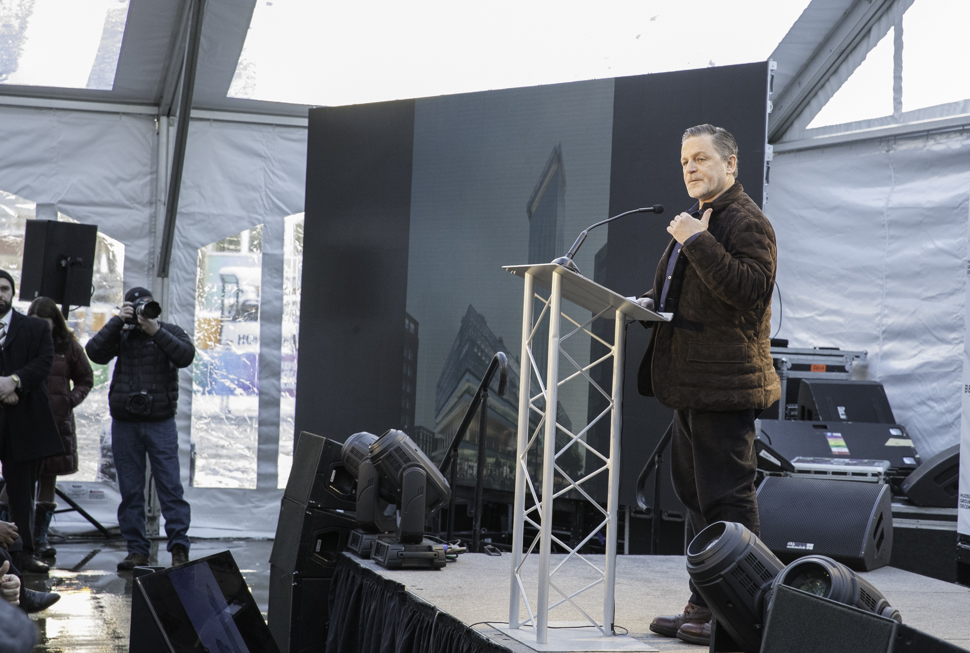
Gilbert speaking at the 2017 groundbreaking of the Hudson's Detroit development

Gilbert's real estate company Bedrock Detroit was founded in 2011 and has purchased several buildings in downtown Detroit, including the historic Madison Theatre Building, Chase Tower, Two Detroit Center, Dime Building, the First National Building, the David Stott Building, and the former Federal Reserve Bank of Chicago Detroit Branch Building. Bedrock Detroit has also purchased several buildings on the city's Woodward Avenue, including One Woodward Avenue and the 1001 Woodward office tower. Gilbert often paid cash for the buildings, since lenders would not finance the transactions. He led Bedrock Detroit to acquire a total of 140 properties and 21 million square feet of space. By 2026, Bedrock has invested $7.5 billion into Downtown Detroit.

In September 2013, Gilbert was named co-chair of the Blight Removal Task Force. The group published a detailed plan in May 2014 to remove all blighted structures and lots in the City of Detroit.

His work on the blight removal task force led him to make a $500 million donation to assist low income residents and local organizations in Detroit. The first $15 million went towards eliminating property tax debt from 20,000 low-income homeowners.

In 2015, he purchased Book Tower in Detroit for the price of $30 million. Over the course of the next seven years, Book Tower was transformed into a mixed-used building containing 229 rental apartments, a 117-room ROOST apartment hotel, commercial offices, and event space, with retail, bars and restaurants at ground level, with a grand reopening in 2022.

A 2017 Politico Magazine article named Gilbert one of "America's 11 Most Interesting Mayors", listing him as though he were Mayor of Detroit due to his role in the city's development.

In September 2017, Detroit Mayor Mike Duggan appointed Gilbert to lead a committee to make a bid for online retail giant Amazon to bring its second North American headquarters to Detroit. In 2018, Amazon narrowed its list of potential headquarters locations, removing Detroit from its list of contenders.

Gilbert's Hudson's Detroit, a 1.5 million square foot project opened in 2025 and includes an office building, which will be the headquarters of General Motors, a 681-foot skyscraper, as well as a hotel, retails stores, restaurants, and luxury apartments. The project is at the former location of the Hudson's Store in Detroit which was closed in 1982. Until 1990 it was corporate offices for Hudson's Department Stores. It sat empty until its implosion in 1998 after multiple efforts to redevelop it failed.

==== Cleveland ====
Gilbert's real estate firm, Bedrock, introduced a $3.5 billion plan to renovate 35 acres of Cleveland's Riverfront and renovations to Tower City Center. The plan includes the development of the Cleveland Clinic Global Peak Performance Center, in partnership with the Cleveland Cavaliers and Cleveland Clinic.

== Philanthropy and political donations ==
In September 2012, Gilbert and his wife Jennifer joined The Giving Pledge, committing to give half of their wealth to philanthropy throughout their lifetimes.

Gilbert's eldest son was born with neurofibromatosis and died at the age of 26 in 2023. Gilbert established two neurofibromatosis research clinics at the Children's National Medical Center (CNMC) in Washington, D.C., and at the Dana Children's Hospital at the Sourasky Medical Center in Tel Aviv, Israel. Gilbert is also on the boards of the Children's Tumor Foundation, the Cleveland Clinic, and the Children's Hospital Foundation (an affiliate of CNMC); and is the vice-chairman of the not-for-profit M-1 RAIL initiative which is dedicated to promoting light-rail transportation in downtown Detroit. Overall, Gilbert has donated in excess of $95 million to support research and treatments of Neurofibromatosis.

In 2015, Gilbert donated $750,000 to the presidential candidacy of Chris Christie.

In September 2016, Gilbert donated $5 million to Wayne State University Law School. In October of that year, Gilbert also donated $15 million toward the planned $50-million Breslin Center renovation project at Michigan State University.

In 2020, Gilbert made a $1.2 million donation to help COVID-19 relief efforts in the city of Detroit.

In 2021, The Gilbert Family Foundation and Rocket Community Fund pledged to invest $500 million in the Detroit Metropolitan area, to be disbursed over the course of 10 years. This includes $15 million that will help pay off the property tax debt of homeowners in lower-income brackets. That same year, they made a $30 million donation to Cranbrook Academy of Art in Michigan.

In 2023, the Gilbert Family donated nearly $400 million to open the Shirley Ryan AbilityLab at the Henry Ford Health campus in Michigan. They also established a fund of $10 million to provide uninsured Detroiters with access to rehabilitation services.

As of September 2023, Gilbert has committed more than $1 billion in philanthropic initiatives.

== Personal life ==
For many years Gilbert and his wife, Jennifer Gilbert, lived together in Michigan. On May 26, 2019, Gilbert was taken to the hospital and treated for a stroke at the age of 57.

Their eldest son, Nick Gilbert, died on May 6, 2023, after a long battle with neurofibromatosis. The couple has four other children together.

Gilbert and his wife Jennifer announced their divorce in September 2025.

== Awards and honors ==
=== Business ===
Quicken Loans/Rocket Mortgage

- 16-time winner: JD Power Highest Customer Satisfaction Award (10 for Primary Mortgage Origination, six for Mortgage Servicing)
- 16-time Fortune 100 Best Companies to Work For (2005–2017)

=== Sports ===
Cleveland Cavaliers

- 2016 NBA Champion
- 2016 Best Team ESPY Award

Cleveland Monsters

- 2016 Calder Cup Champion

Greater Cleveland Sports Awards

- 2025 Lifetime Achievement Award

== See also ==
- List of NBA team owners

Sporting positions
Preceded by Gordon Gund	Cleveland Cavaliers principal owner 2005–present	Incumbent
