= Asset recovery =

Asset recovery, also known as investment recovery or resource recovery, is the process of maximizing the value of unused, excess, or end-of-life assets through reuse, redeployment, or divestment. Businesses often use it to manage surplus inventory, refurbished goods, or equipment returned after leases, and it’s also common during liquidation to sell off a company’s assets.

Asset recovery can also refer to reclaiming assets wrongfully taken—such as those stolen, fraudulently misappropriated, or illegally removed—from their rightful owners.

Asset recovery has three main elements—identification, redeployment, and divestment. Specialized asset recovery software may assist any of these steps.

== Identification ==
Because unproductive assets cost money, it is important to classify them as such by investment recovery personnel. Later, a decision can be made whether to redeploy or divest. Surplus assets could be in any form, including fixed equipment, mobile equipment, buildings, or land. Idle or surplus assets can be either capital assets or non-capital surplus.

== Redeployment ==
Redeploying an idle asset to another part of an organization is often the most productive use for the asset. Asset redeployment also saves the organization money by eliminating the need to purchase a new asset at current market rates. For effective reuse, another part of the company needs to require an asset of that kind. It must also be practical to transfer and deploy the asset at the new location.

One form of internal redeployment is cannibalization of usable spare parts from one asset to another. For example, a taxicab company has two non-running cabs with different non-working parts in each. By taking a working part from one non-running cab and placing it in the other, the company has reduced its number of non-running cabs by 50%.

== Disposition ==
Disposition of surplus or idle assets is the process of either selling, scrapping, recycling, donating, or disposing an asset. The process involves removing the asset from an organization's books. When this is done effectively, the organization obtains capital that can be placed back into the business. In addition, a good asset sale produces revenue and boosts profits. Donations also build goodwill and deliver tax benefits. The type of disposition method employed will depend on the type of asset, its fair value, and market demand.

== See also ==
- Civil recovery
- Lawsuit Enforcement - process of recovering assets from lawsuit defendant
