= African Adaptation Solutions Challenge =

Annual event

The African Youth Adaptation Solutions Challenge (YouthADAPT Challenge) is an annual competition and award. It was launched on 6th September 2021 that focuses on youth-led enterprises in Africa working on climate adaptation solutions. It is a collaborative effort between the Global Center on Adaptation, European Union and the Climate Investment Funds under the Africa Adaptation Acceleration Program's YouthADAPT flagship pillar.

The challenge aims to support and highlight innovative ideas and projects developed by young entrepreneurs who addressing climate change challenges and contributing to building resilience in African communities.

In 2021, Akinwumi Adesina, President, African Development Bank presented the awards and it was moderated by Alan Kasujja.
