= Simple Energy (software company) =

American software company

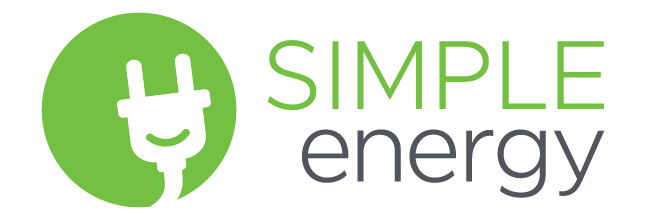
- Company type: Private
- Industry: Software
- Founded: 2010; 16 years ago in Boulder, Colorado
- Founder: Yoav Lurie; Justin Segall
- Headquarters: Boulder, Colorado, U.S.
- Area served: Worldwide
- Key people: Yoav Lurie (CEO); Justin Segall (President)
- Products: Customer Engagement Platform; Software as a Service; Social Energy Competition Portal; Mobile Applications
- Number of employees: ~50 (May 2015)
- Website: simpleenergysoftware.com

Simple Energy is a privately held software-as-a-service (SaaS) company headquartered in Boulder, Colorado.

== History ==
Simple Energy was founded in 2010 by longtime friends Yoav Lurie and Justin Segall, classmates at Duke University. The two had met on a backpacking trip in Pisgah National Forest in 2000.

== Green Button ==
In September 2011, then-US CTO Aneesh Chopra challenged the energy industry to model a Green Button, off the successful Blue Button, where energy providers would give energy users their consumption data in an easy to read and use format at the click of the button. In January 2012, Simple Energy became the first third-party application developer to implement the Green Button standard to deploy publicly available applications.

== Awards and lists ==
- In July 2012, Simple Energy Founders Yoav Lurie and Justin Segall were named to Inc. Magazine's "30 Under 30" list of the top 30 entrepreneurs under 30 years old.
- In June 2012, Simple Energy was named to Bloomberg Businessweek list of "America's Most Promising Social Entrepreneurs".
- In August 2011, Simple Energy was named one of "Eight Startups Changing the World" by Mashable.

== See also ==
- Energy management software
- Smart grid
- Clean technology
