= Rocket Mortgage =

American mortgage lending company

Rocket Mortgage, LLC

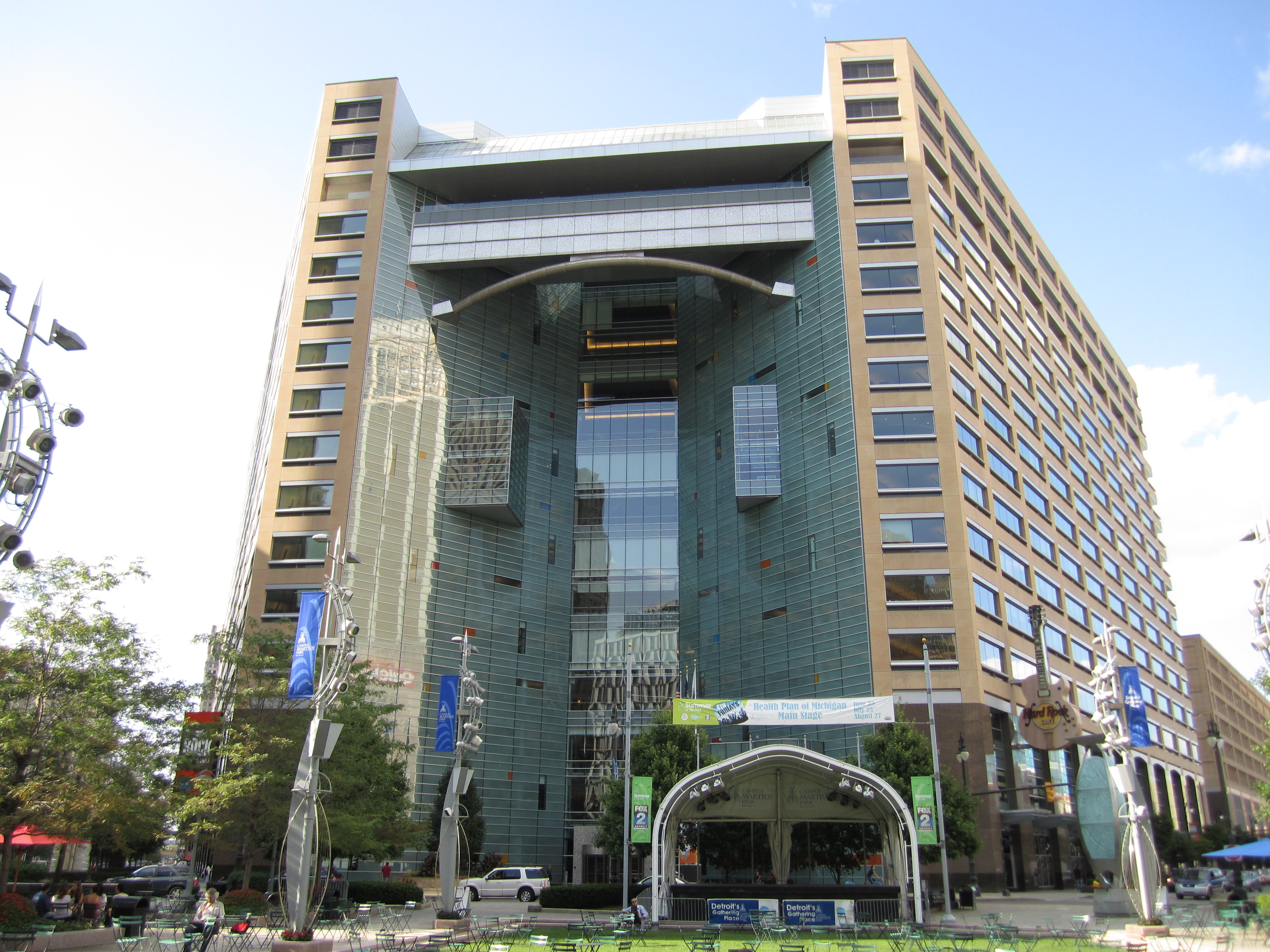
- One Campus Martius, the headquarters of Rocket Mortgage.
- Formerly: Rock Financial (1985–1999); Quicken Loans, LLC (1999–2021)
- Type: Subsidiary
- Industry: Financial technology; Mortgage loans
- Founded: 1985; 41 years ago (as Rock Financial)
- Founders: Dan Gilbert; Ron Berman; Gary Gilbert; Lindsay Gross
- Headquarters: One Campus Martius, Detroit, Michigan, U.S.
- Key people: Jay Bray (CEO); Austin Niemiec (Chief Revenue Officer); Jay Jones (Chief Servicing Officer)
- Products: 15- and 30-year fixed-rate mortgages; FHA loans; VA loans; ARM loans; Jumbo loans; Home Equity Loans
- Brands: Rocket Mortgage
- Revenue: ▲US$15.735 billion (2020)
- Operating income: ▲US$9.532 billion (2020)
- Net income: ▲US$932 million (2020)
- Total assets: ▲US$37.535 billion (2020)
- Total equity: ▲US$7.882 billion (2020)
- Owner: Dan Gilbert (93.2%)
- Number of employees: 14,700 (2024)
- Parent: Rocket Companies
- Website: rocketmortgage.com

Rocket Mortgage, LLC, formerly Quicken Loans, LLC, is an American mortgage lender, headquartered in Detroit, Michigan. It is one of the largest U.S. virtual mortgage leaders. Rocket Mortgage uses wholesale funding for loans and online applications as opposed to a branch system.

== History ==
=== Early history: 1985–1998 ===
Rock Financial was founded as a mortgage broker in 1985 by Dan Gilbert, Ron Berman, Lindsay Gross, and Gary Gilbert. The company became a mortgage lender in 1988, and in May 1998 became publicly traded, launching an Initial public offering (IPO).

In the late 1990s, the company shifted from a traditional mortgage provider to an online-focused lender. Traditionally, the home mortgage business in America has been fragmented due to varying regulations in each state and locality. Gilbert challenged this orthodoxy, however, by offering loan applications online that were reviewed by experts versed in the regulations of each region but who were located in a central headquarters.

=== Quicken Loans ===
==== 1999–2013 ====
In October 1999, almost a year and a half after Rock Financial's 1998 IPO, Intuit agreed to buy the company at a valuation of $370 million. The name changed to Quicken Loans. In 2002, Dan Gilbert and a group of private investors bought the company back.

In 2004, Quicken Loans became a defendant in a class action lawsuit on behalf of employees who had worked as loan consultants. In 2011, a jury ruled in favor of Quicken.

In August 2007, Quicken Loans discontinued second mortgages, home equity lines of credit, Alt-A products, and deferred interest loans.

On November 12, 2007, it moved its headquarters to downtown Detroit under a development agreement with the city. Quicken Loans moved into its downtown Detroit headquarters in August 2010. The initial move brought 1,700 employees to the city.

Former logo of Quicken Loans

==== 2014–2020 ====
In 2014, Quicken Loans was the nation's largest online mortgage lender. In January 2018, they became the nation's largest mortgage lender.

On October 15, 2018, Quicken Loans announced that it was expanding into Canada by opening a tech center in downtown Windsor, Ontario.

On August 6, 2020, Rocket Companies, Inc. went public on the New York Stock Exchange under the symbol RKT, raising $1.8 billion. Quicken Loans was the largest subsidiary of the newly formed, public traded entity that also included Rocket Homes, Rocket Loans, Amrock and other tech-driven personal finance companies.

=== Rocket Mortgage ===
Former logo as Rocket Mortgage.

==== 2015–2021 ====
The platform was developed under the leadership of then-president and CMO Jay Farner, who intended to create a "push-button" mortgage experience. Following the launch, Farner was promoted to CEO of Quicken Loans (now Rocket Mortgage) in 2017, succeeding Bill Emerson.

In 2015, the company developed an online only mortgage process called "Rocket Mortgage." In its first full year, the Rocket Mortgage platform funded $7 billion in closed loans.

In 2019, the company became the first mortgage lender to perform electronic closings (eClosings) in all 50 states. That year the company doubled its mortgage originations.

==== 2021–present ====
In March 2021, the company was the number one mortgage lender by overall business in the United States, a title it held until October 2022.

On May 12, 2021, Quicken Loans announced that it would be rebranded to Rocket Mortgage, by July 31, 2021.

In 2025, Rocket Mortgage introduced the RocketRentRewards program, that offers up to $5,000 to help renters become homeowners.

== See also ==
- Rocket Companies – Parent company of Rocket Mortgage and its affiliates
- Rocket Arena – A multi-purpose arena in Downtown Cleveland, Ohio
