= City Hall Historic District (Battle Creek, Michigan) =

- U.S. National Register of Historic Places
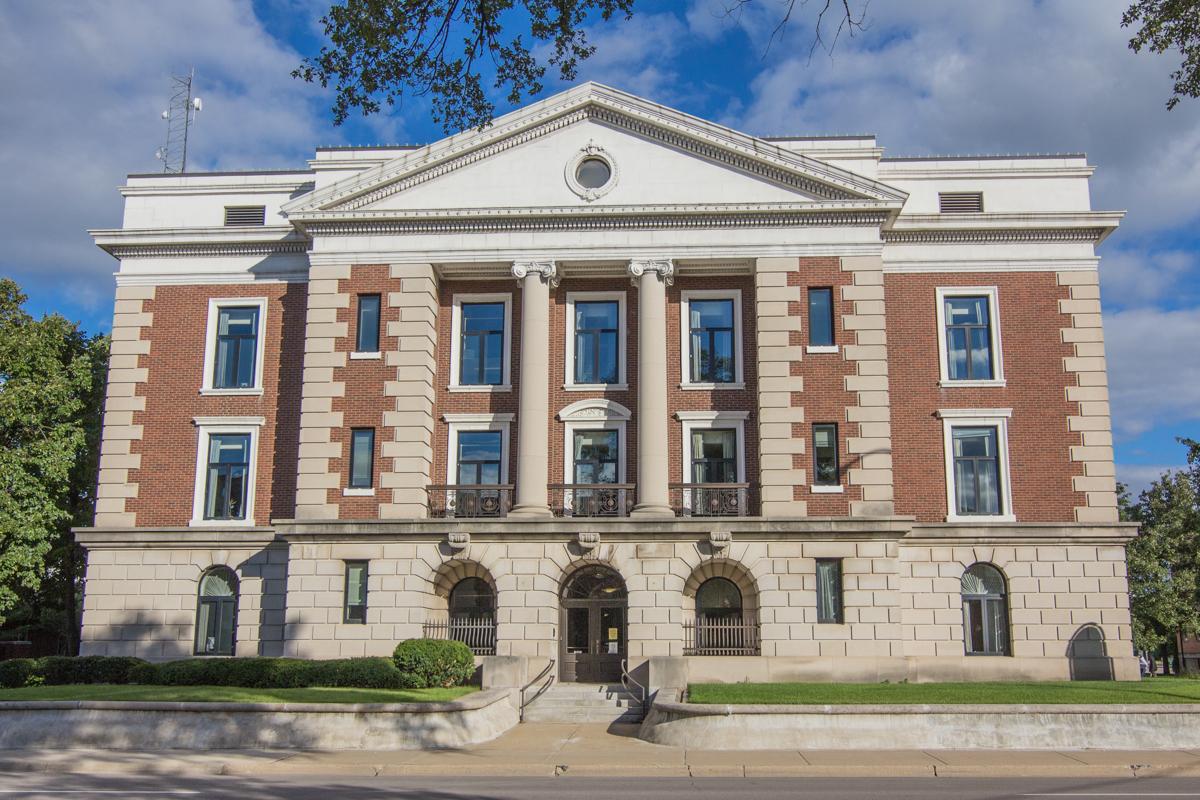
- Battle Creek City Hall
- Interactive map
- Location: E. Michigan Ave., from Monroe to Jay Sts., Battle Creek, Michigan
- Coordinates: 42°19′01″N 85°10′47″W
- Area: 14 acres (5.7 ha)
- Architect: Albert Kahn, Ernest W. Arnold
- Architectural style: Classical Revival, Gothic Revival
- NRHP reference No.: 96000366
- Added to NRHP: April 4, 1996

The City Hall Historic District is a commercial and municipal historic district located along East Michigan Avenue from Monroe to Jay Streets in Battle Creek, Michigan. It was listed on the National Register of Historic Places in 1996.

== History ==
The central part of Battle Creek was first platted in 1836, and this section became the site of some of the earliest development in the settlement. The first stores and initial commercial section was just west of the present City Hall Historic District, but the first house in Battle Creek was likely located within the bounds of the district. The first school, built in 1834, was within the district, and booth the Methodist and Baptist congregations constructed churches within the district soon after. Commercial development also quickly spread along Michigan Avenue into the district, and by mid-century the first few blocks of Michigan were lined with one- and two-story wooden stores. By the 1870s, commercial development had spread through the entire district, and the wooden stores were replaced by more substantial brick buildings.

After the turn of the century, the most substantial buildings in the district, the ole Post Office and the City Hall, were constructed. The district has been continually used for both municipal and commercial purposed into the twenty-first century.

== Description ==
The City Hall Historic District runs for two blocks along Michigan Avenue, and contains 19 buildings and structures, of which 12 contribute to the historic nature of the district. Two of these buildings are significant in their own right: Old Battle Creek Post Office and Battle Creek City Hall. It also contains a Masonic temple, two churches, a city park, and several late nineteenth- and early twentieth-century commercial buildings.

Contributing buildings and structures include:

- Battle Creek Gas Co. Building (26 E. Michigan Avenue): Built in 1901.
- Commercial building (30 E. Michigan Avenue): Built in 1916.
- Binder Block (34 E. Michigan Avenue): Built in 1887.
- Potter Block (36-40 E. Michigan Avenue): Built in 1880-81.
- Elizabeth Block (66-68 E. Michigan Avenue): Built in 1913.
- Commercial building (70 E. Michigan Avenue): Built in 1891-95.
- First Baptist Church (80 E. Michigan Avenue): Built in 1871-72.
- Battle Creek City Hall (103 E. Michigan Avenue): Built in 1912-14.
- First United Methodist Church (114 E. Michigan Avenue): Built in 1908.
- Commercial building (118-120 E . Michigan Avenue): Built in 1904.
- Commercial building (122-124 E. Michigan Avenue.): Built pre-1911.
- Masonic Temple (133 E. Michigan Avenue): Built in 1913-14.
- Post Office Building (80 E. State Street): Built in 1904-07.
- Post Park: Includes a monument to cereal manufacturer C. W. Post erected in 1916.

== Gallery ==
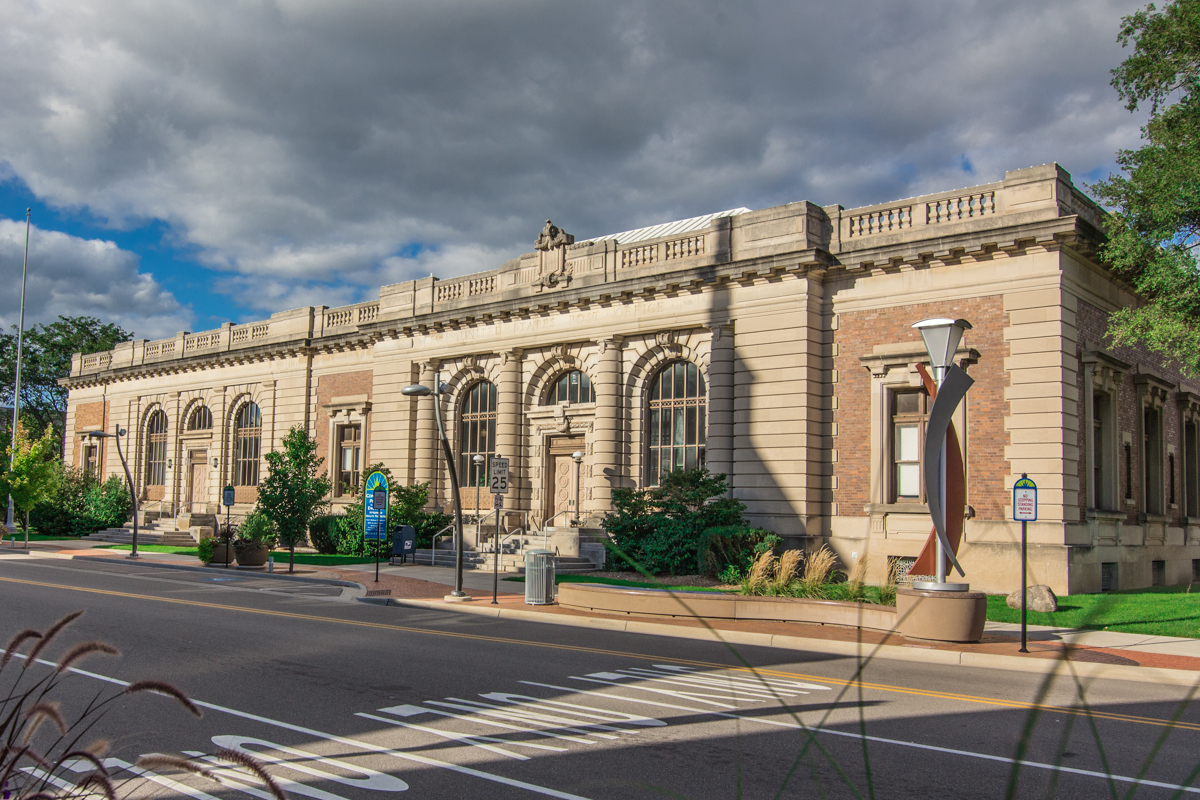
Battle Creek Post Office

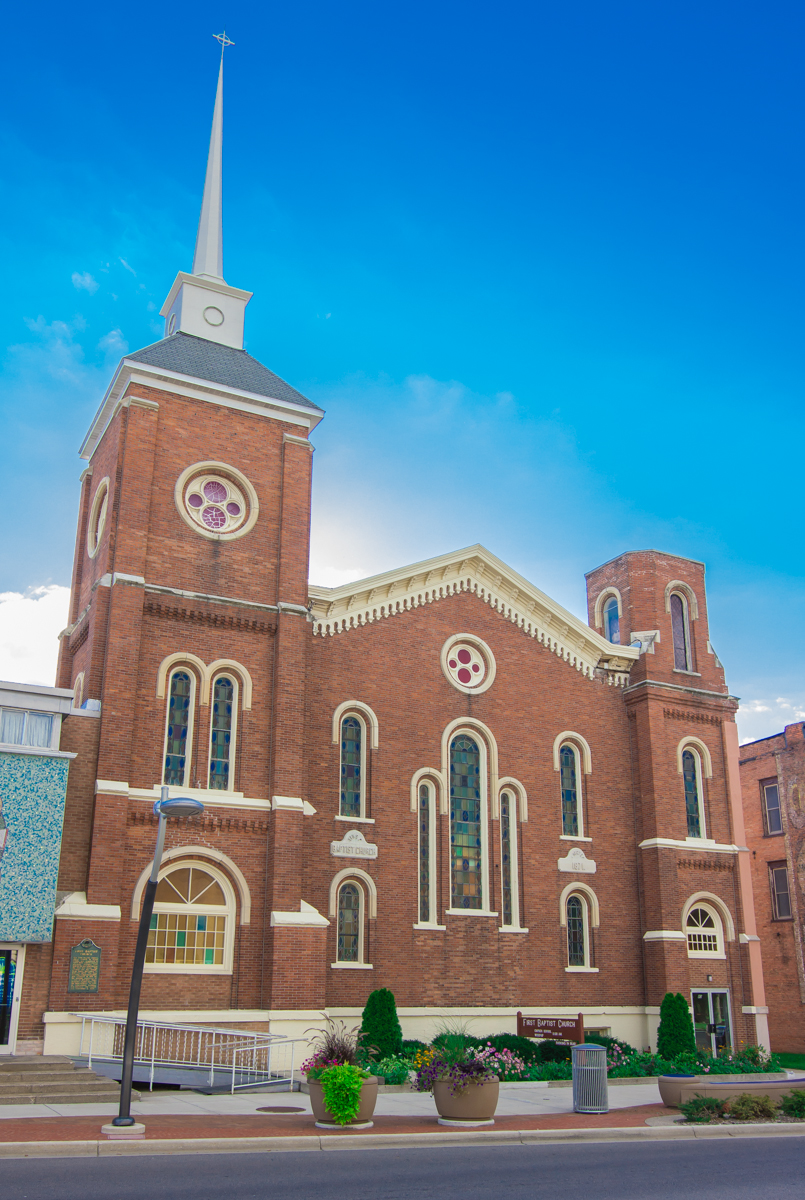
First Baptist Church

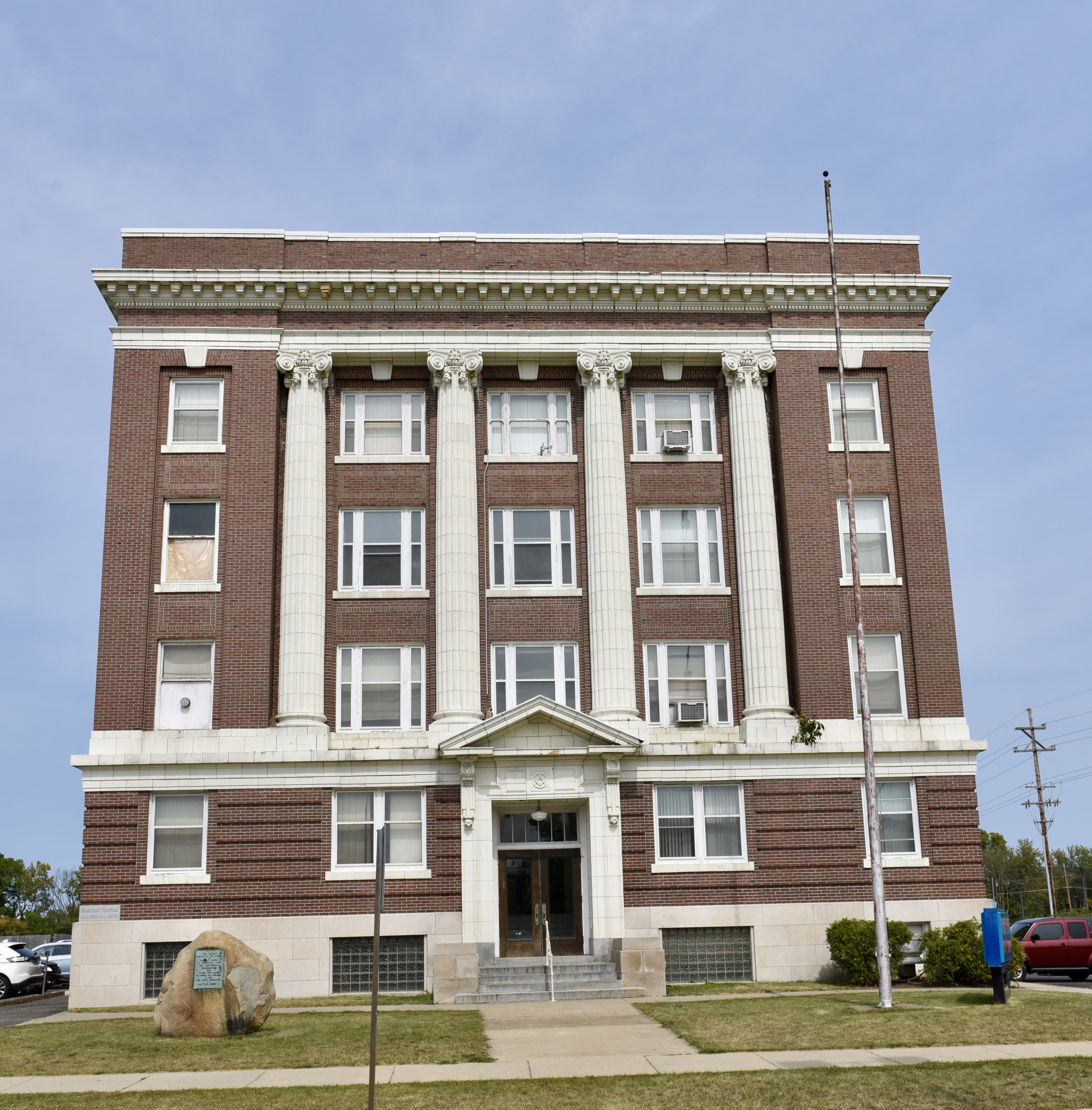
Masonic Temple
