= Old Battle Creek Post Office =

- Battle Creek Post Office
- U.S. National Register of Historic Places
- U.S. Historic district – Contributing property
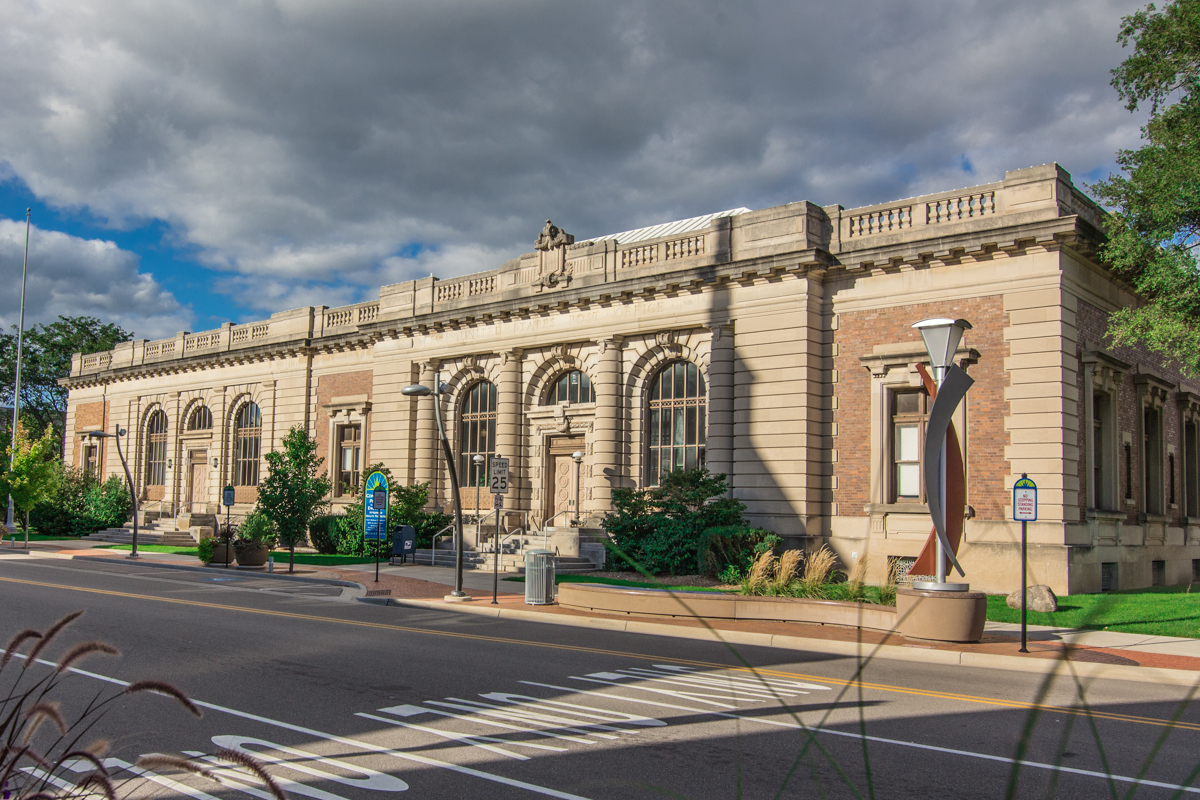

- Location within Michigan Location within the United States
- Interactive map
- Location: 67 E. Michigan Ave., Battle Creek, Michigan
- Coordinates: 42°19′02″N 85°10′48″W
- Area: less than one acre
- Built: 1904
- Built by: Charles A. Howind
- Architect: Albert Kahn
- Architectural style: Renaissance Revival
- Part of: City Hall Historic District (Battle Creek, Michigan) (ID96000366)
- NRHP reference No.: 72000597
- Added to NRHP: August 21, 1972

The Old Battle Creek Post Office is a former post office located at 67 East Michigan Avenue in Battle Creek, Michigan. It was listed on the National Register of Historic Places in 1972.

== History ==
In 1904, Congress appropriated funds for the construction of a new post office in Battle Creek. Albert Kahn was chosen as the architect, one of the first commissions he completed after opening his own Detroit office. Kahn produced plans for the building by the end of the year. Contractor Charles A. Howind was awarded the contract to complete the building, and it was dedicated in 1907. In 1930–1931, an addition was constructed, carefully following the style of the original, which approximately doubled the post office's size. In 1968, a new post office was built and the old one vacated. It was eventually refurbished into office space.

== Description ==
The old Battle Creek Post Office is a stone-and-brick structure measuring approximately 112 feet long and 75 feet deep. The 1930–1931 addition, although carefully matched in style, obscures the symmetry of the original design. Stone quoins run along the corners, and a stone balustrade and a denticulated stone cornice run across the top. Both the original structure and the matching addition have two stone arched windows measuring approximately 8 feet wide and 16 feet high, decorated with a cast-iron grillwork.
