= Omaha Ford Motor Company Assembly Plant =

- U.S. National Register of Historic Places
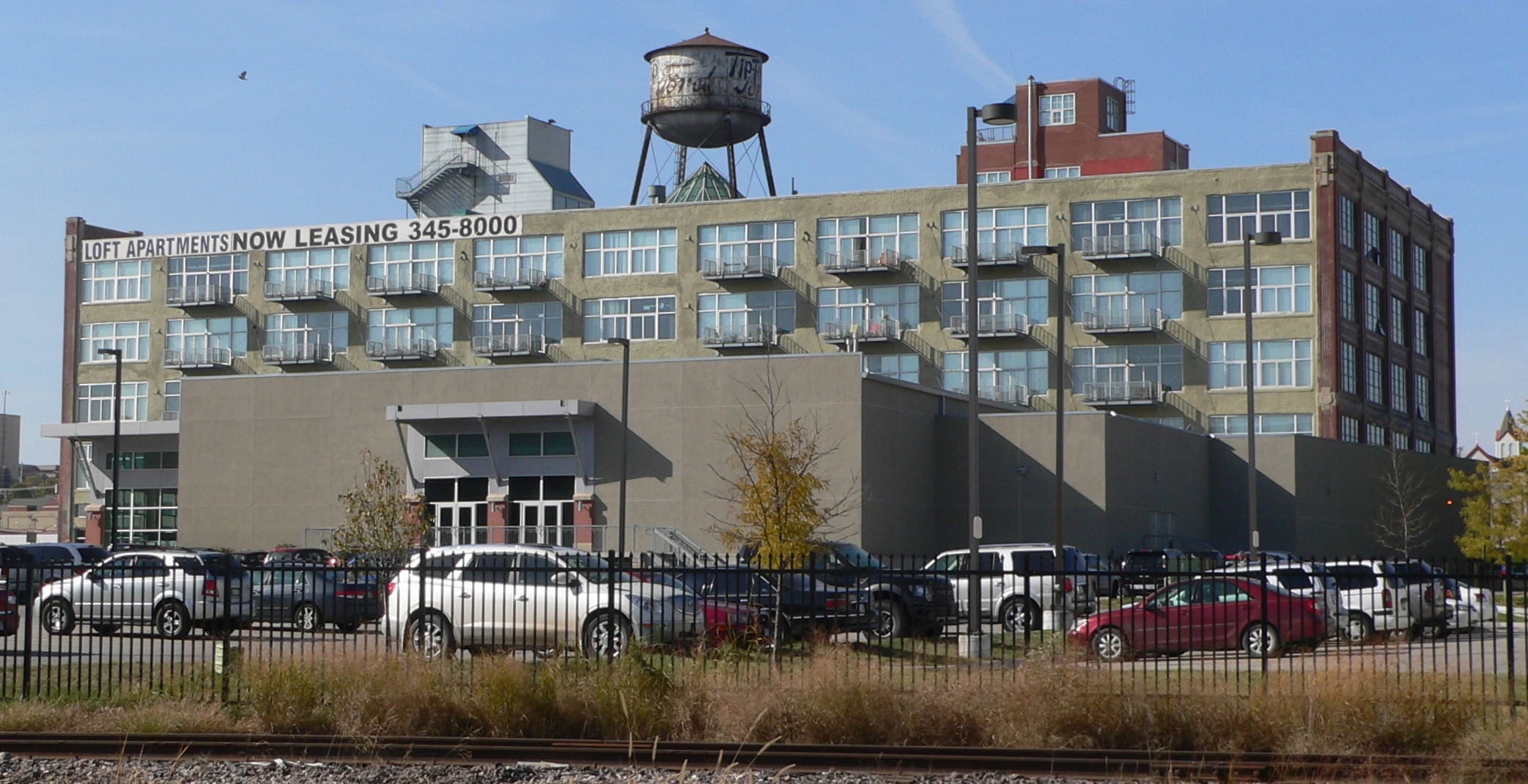
- Ford assembly plant, now TipTop Apartments; seen from the east

- Location within Nebraska Location within the United States
- Location: Omaha, Nebraska
- Coordinates: 41°16′5″N 95°56′11″W
- Built: 1916
- Architect: Albert Kahn
- Architectural style: Late 19th And 20th Century Revivals
- NRHP reference No.: 04001412
- Added to NRHP: December 29, 2004

The Omaha Ford Motor Company Assembly Plant is located at 1514-1524 Cuming Street in North Omaha, Nebraska. In its 16 years of operation, the plant employed 1,200 people and built approximately 450,000 cars and trucks. In the 1920s, it was Omaha's second-biggest shipper.

== History ==
=== Ford plant ===
The plant was designed by Albert Kahn as a Model T assembly plant, and built in 1916. Its design represents an important step in the development of Ford's assembly process. Previously, each step in the assembly of an automobile had taken place in a different building, which entailed a cost in time and labor to move the product from one building to another. From 1903 to 1916, Kahn designed "all-under-one-roof" buildings for a variety of manufacturers. In such buildings, Ford's usual practice was to begin assembly on the top floor and move downward until the product was finished at ground level. The Omaha plant was an exception to this: assembly began on the lowest floor and moved upward. It is speculated that the roof was used for storage of finished automobiles.

In 1917, Kahn designed the first single-floor assembly plant with a continuous moving assembly line at Ford's Rouge River plant. This design supplanted the older one; the Model A, which replaced the Model T, used a continuous line that could not be installed in the Omaha plant. Assembly ceased at the Omaha plant in 1932. Ford continued to use the building as a sales and service center until 1955.

=== Post-Ford ===
After Ford's departure, the building was used as a warehouse by the Western Electric Company from 1956 to 1959. It was then vacant until 1963, when it was occupied by Tip Top Products, an Omaha manufacturer of liquid solder, hair accessories, and other plastic goods founded by Carl W. Renstrom. Tip Top left the building in 1986, after which it was again vacant for several years. It served as a tire warehouse and retail outlet for some time, but then fell vacant again.

In 2005, the building was opened as TipTop Apartments, a mixed-use building with office space on the first floor and with 96 loft-style apartments on the upper levels; an adjoining building houses a banquet-and-conference center.

== See also ==
- History of Omaha
