= Ford Engineering Laboratory =

Automotive facility

Coordinates: 42°18′16″N 83°14′14″W

The Ford Engineering Laboratory is a Ford Motor Company facility designed by architect Albert Kahn in the 1920s and completed in 1930. It was originally used by Henry Ford as a multi-purpose facility. Its primary use was to house Ford's product development staff but was also home to a number of Ford's other projects such as the Dearborn Independent newspaper, a folk dancing studio, and accounting department. FEL is located at 21500 Oakwood Blvd in Dearborn, Michigan.

FEL is notable for its Bedford limestone facade, which includes Beaux Arts style carved figures representing natural forces, and the names of scientific and industrial figures that Henry Ford admired, including Ford's friend and mentor Thomas Edison, Benjamin Franklin, Galileo, and others.

FEL is currently in use by Ford, where it houses engineering staff and the Ford Motor Company archives. The rear portion of the building is shared with The Henry Ford as an annex. The interior of the building is not open to the public.

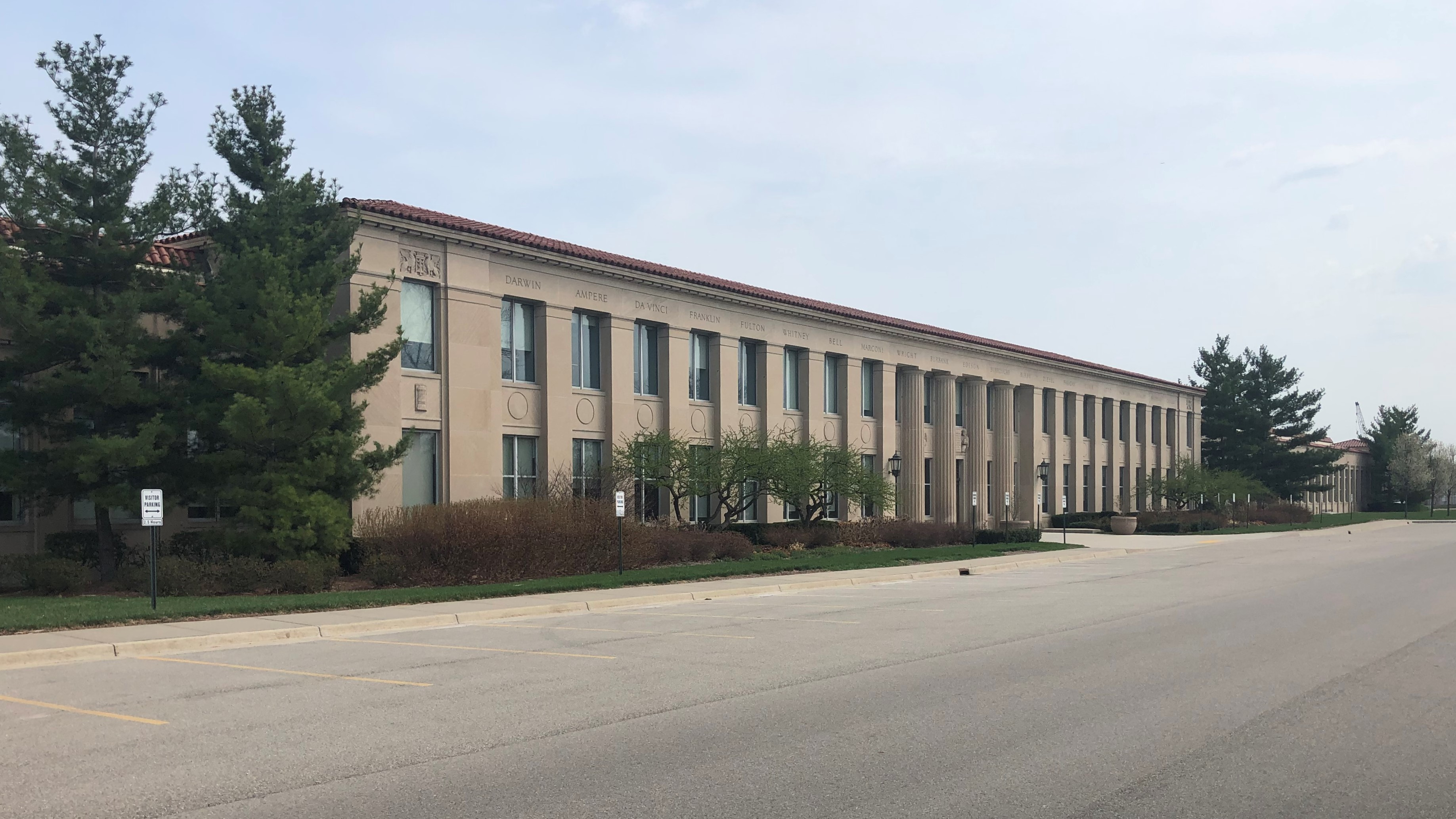
Ford Engineering Laboratory, main entrance (designed by Albert Kahn, 1920s)

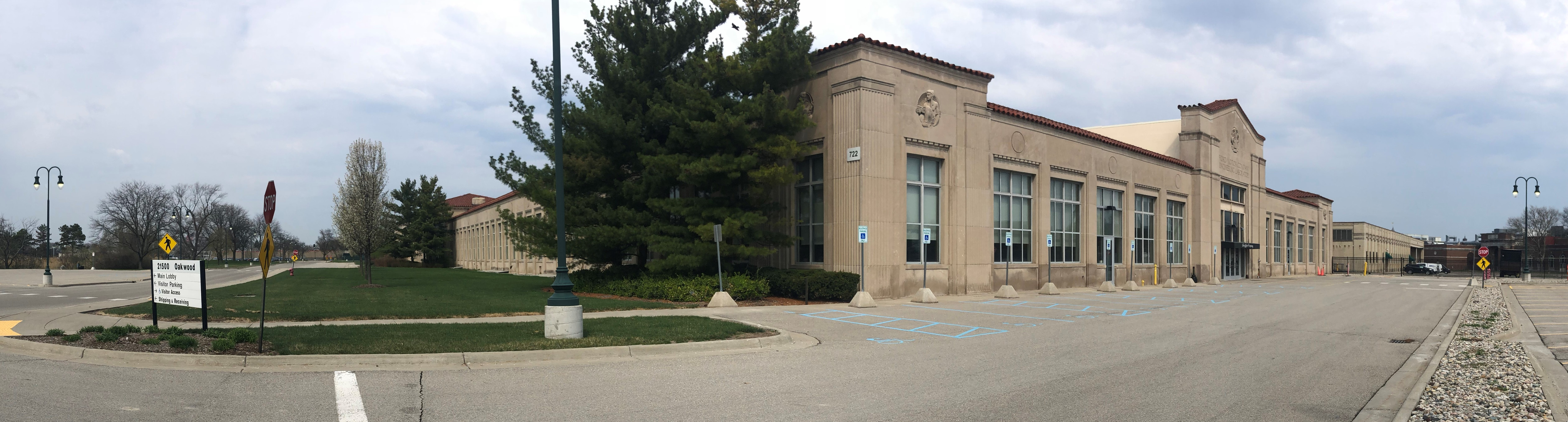
Ford Engineering Laboratory, southern corner (designed by Albert Kahn, 1920s)

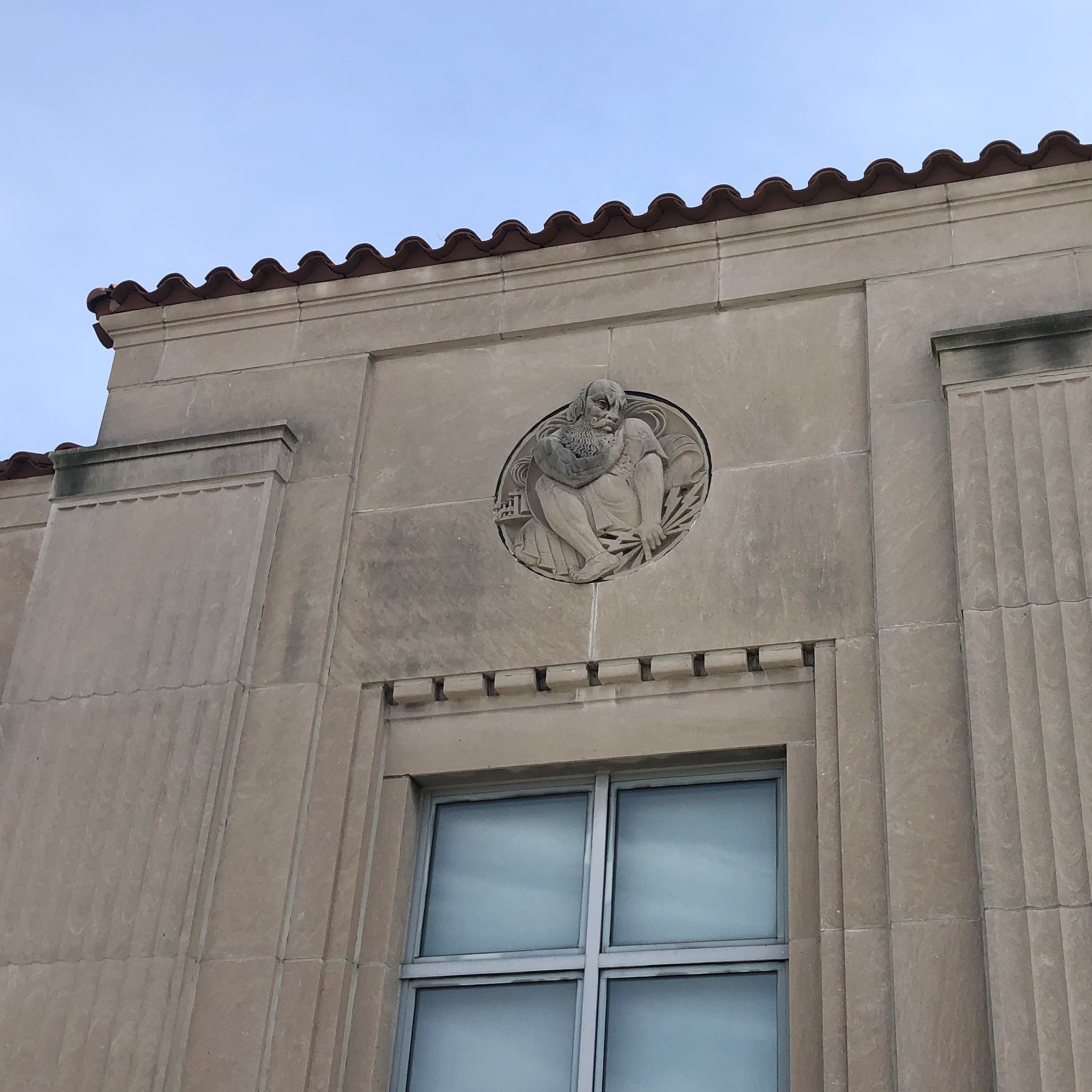
Ford Engineering Laboratory—detail: Figure of Electricity

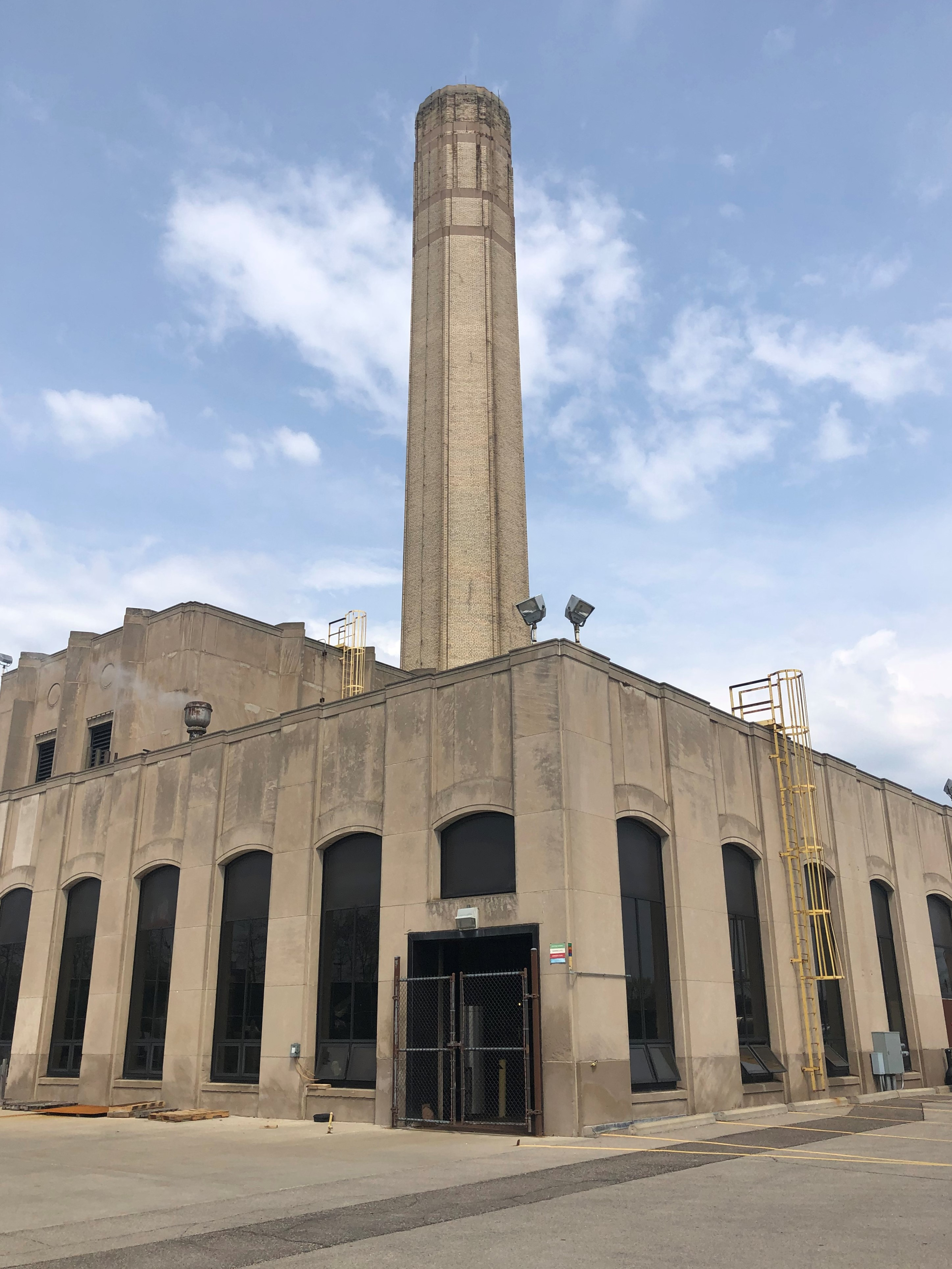
Powerhouse of the Ford Engineering Laboratory (FEL), designed by Albert Kahn and completed in 1930
