= Dominion Tire Plant =

Manufacturing facility in Kitchener, Ontario, Canada

Coordinates: 43.45211°N 80.51157°W

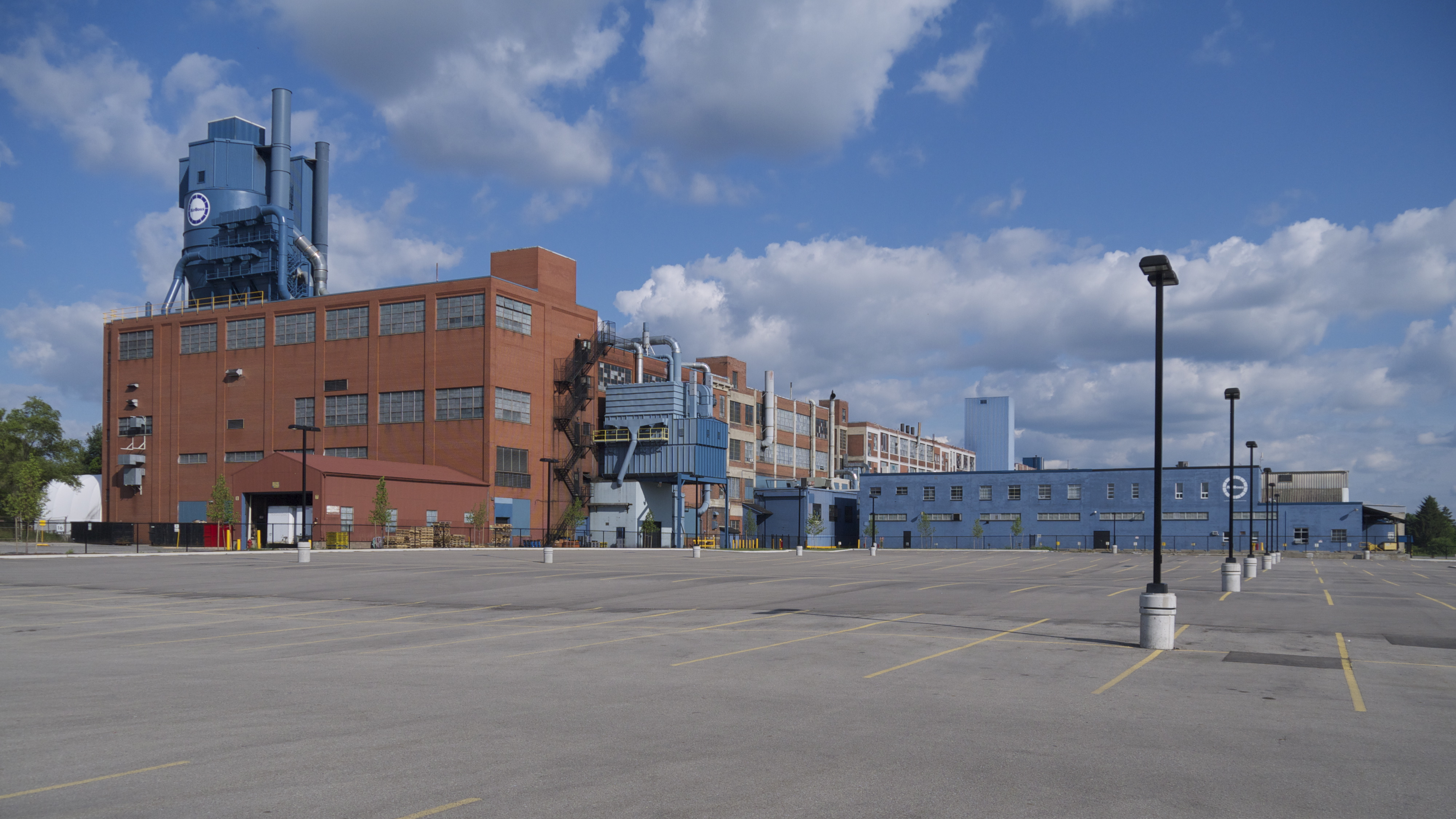
The plant in 2013

The Dominion Tire Plant, later known as the Uniroyal Tire Plant then the Uniroyal-Goodrich Tire Plant and today known as AirBoss Rubber Compounding is a rubber and tire company located on Glasgow Street in Kitchener, Ontario. It is the largest independent rubber mixing plant in North America.

== History ==
In 1912 the Town of Berlin was officially designated a city, and in 1916 became known as Kitchener, named after Earl Kitchener.

City Councillors and business leaders began an intense campaign to bring large, industrial companies to the new city and to invest new capital in the area. By 1913, the campaign had resulted in three new factories, which would become cornerstones to Kitchener’s economic development and which are still in existence today:

1. The Dominion Tire Company;
2. The Williams, Green and Rome Shirt and Collar Company (later the Arrow Shirt Factory) on Benton Street; and
3. The Buffalo Forge Company (later Canadian Blower and Forge) on Highland Road.

Kitchener would win the bid of the Canadian Consolidated Rubber Co. (CCR) to build their tire plant there, even though larger and more developed cities had also placed bids: (Montreal, Hamilton, Guelph, London and Windsor).

=== Name history ===
The original name of the plant was the Dominion Tire Company. In 1966, the company’s corporate name was changed to Uniroyal, and in the 1980s Uniroyal merged with B.F. Goodrich.

== Construction ==
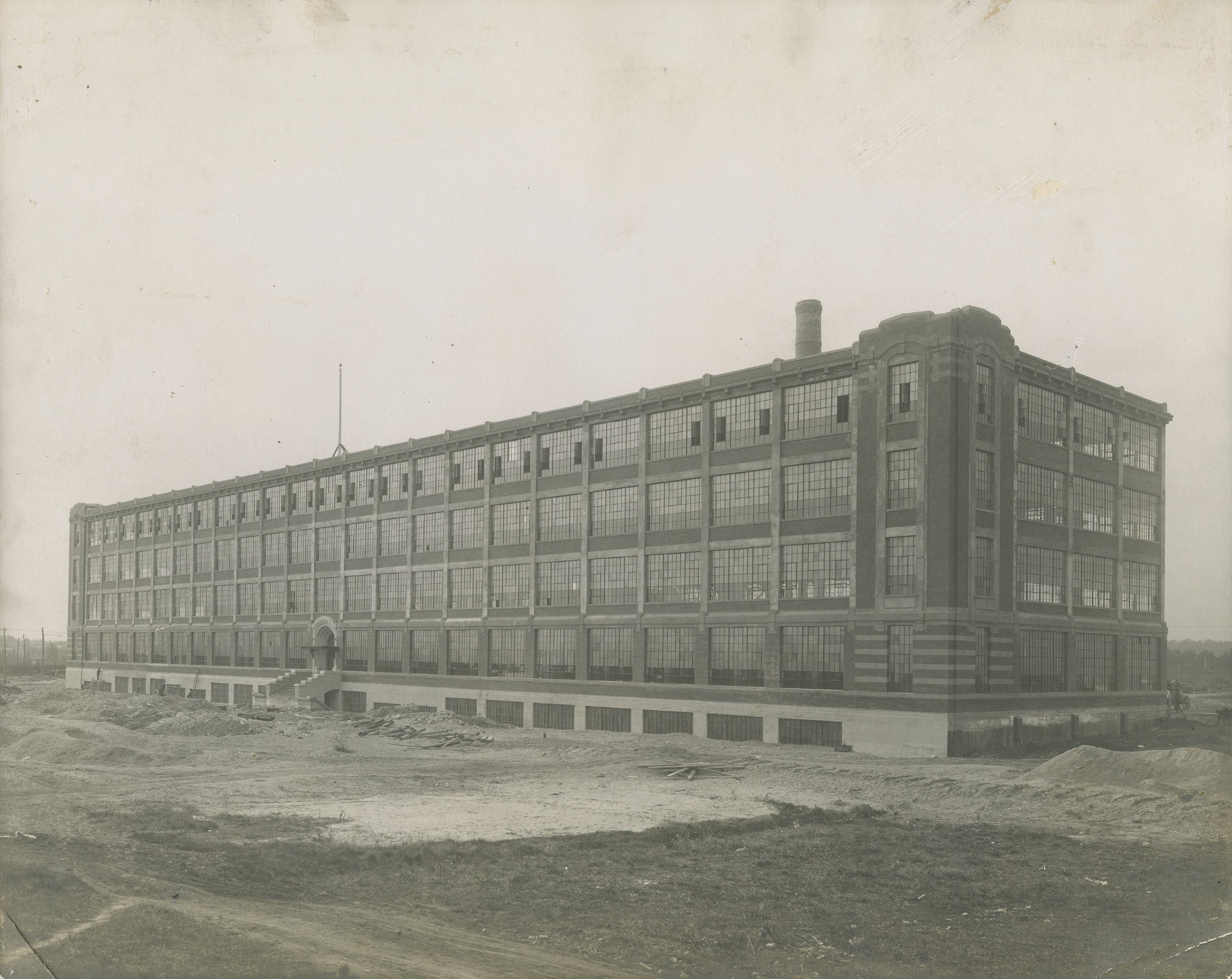
Front elevation of the Dominion Tire factory shortly after being built in 1914.

The plant was designed by Albert Kahn Associates, a leading industrial architect in the first half of the 20th century. Ground was broken in August 1912 on a 40-acre location now known as Glasgow and Strange Streets.

During construction a number of human skeletons were found, which were discovered to have been from aboriginals living in the area as far back as the 1600s.

The main entrance was off Strange Street through the administrative offices, an entrance which remains today with a large sign reading "Employees Entrance" and "Work Office" although employees now enter through the Glasgow Street warehouse.

The original building stands 5 storeys high, or 230 x 90 feet, and runs perpendicular to the adjacent CN Rail train tracks. After renovations, the factory is over one million square feet.

=== Building renovations ===
The boom of tire and rubber production in 1919, as well as Canada's/Great Britain's into World War One, required renovations. The original factory was given new wings on both north and south ends of the building. By 1946, even more space was required and a four-floor addition for shipping docks and warehouse facilities was built as a south-east extension to the main plant. A warehouse behind the tire factory was added in 1957. During the 1960s, that warehouse and the main plant received additions, and another building to house administration offices and other departments was also constructed.

== Production ==
Daily production of tires began in 1914. At that time the factory employed around 500 people. By 1919, 1,825 people worked at Dominion Tire and produced between 1,800 and 2,000 tires a day.

Previously, the plant produced a number of rubber products, from car tires to military gas masks. But today AirBoss Rubber Compounding strictly compounds rubber and is a major supplier to Goodyear, Michelin, and others. Other compounds are manufactured for conveyor belts and the mining industry as well as many other products including automotive parts.
