= Michele Oka Doner =

American artist and author

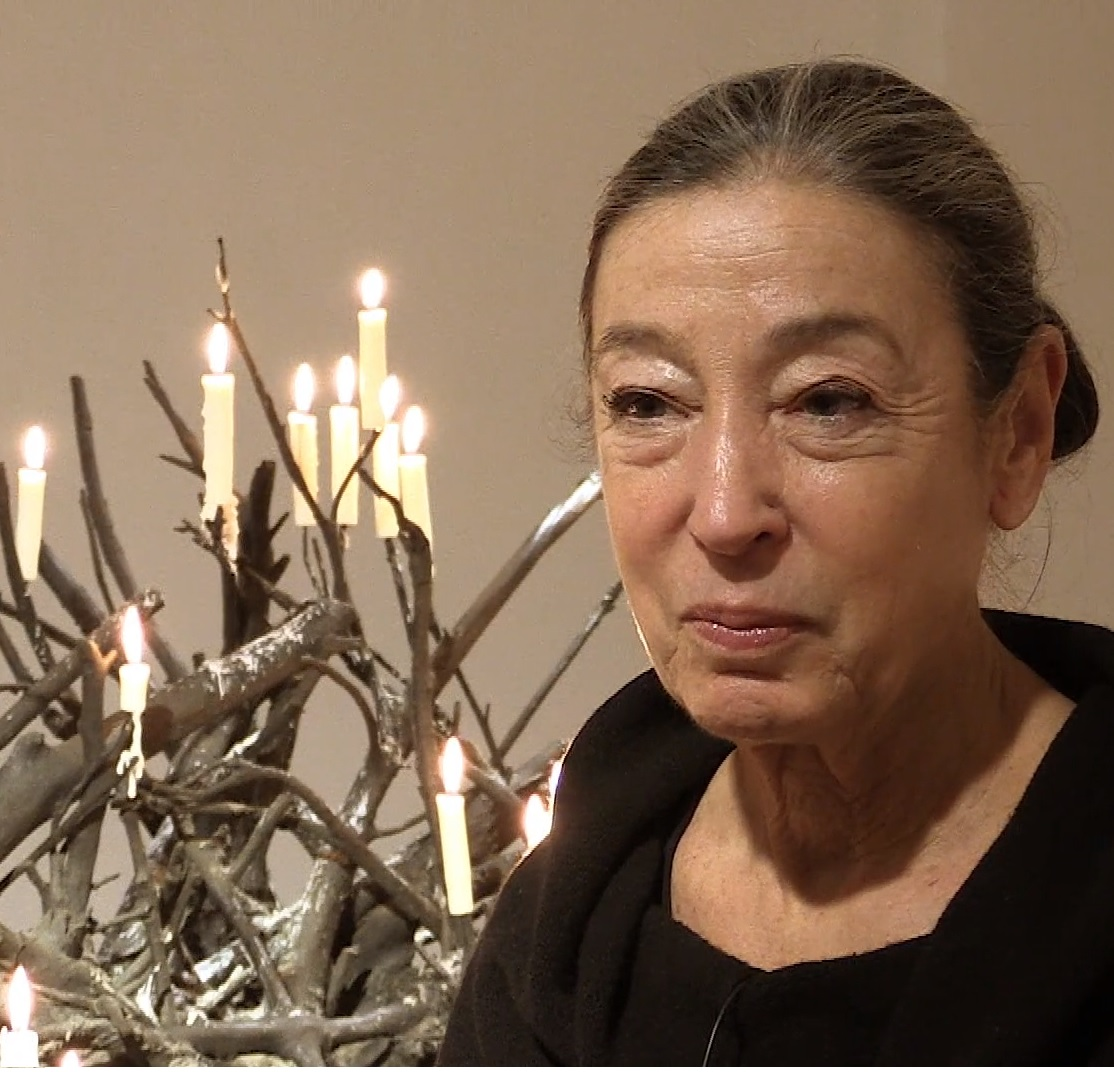
- Oka Doner: Bringing the Fire 2018
- Born: 1945 (age 80–81); Miami Beach, Florida, United States
- Education: University of Michigan
- Known for: Artist, author
- Notable work: "A Walk on the Beach" Miami International Airport

Michele Oka Doner (born 1945, Miami Beach, Florida, United States) is an American artist and author who works in a variety of media including sculpture, prints, drawings, functional objects and video. She has also worked in costume and set design and has created over 40 public and private permanent art installations, including “A Walk On The Beach,” a one and a quarter mile long bronze and terrazzo concourse at Miami International Airport.

== Early life ==
Born and raised in Miami Beach, Oka Doner's father, Kenneth Oka, was elected judge and mayor of Miami Beach during her youth (1945–1964). The family lived a public and politically active life. In later years, Oka Doner co-authored, with Mitchell Wolfson Jr. Miami Beach: Blueprint of an Eden, an intimate portrayal of Miami Beach from the 1920s to the 1960s using their families as prisms to reflect the times. Reviewed as classic of social history, with material that was part of the public record of its time, it was used as a textbook in Human Geography at George Washington University in 2008.

In 1957, age 12, Oka Doner began a year-long independent project studying the International Geophysical Year (IGY). She assembled a book of drawings, writings and collages that became a template for projects realized in later years.

== Education ==
In 1963, Oka Doner left Florida for the University of Michigan, Ann Arbor. Her art instructor Milton Cohen was experimenting with The Space Theater and George Manupelli began the Ann Arbor Film Festival. Their students were engaged in poetry, dance, light, music, all combined into a unitary vision, a motif that shaped Oka Doner's student years and is characteristic of her work today. Oka Doner participated in a Manupelli experimental film, a "Map Read" performance with art drawing instructor Al Loving and Judsonite dancer Steve Paxton as well as several "Happenings." Another influence was art historian and Islamic scholar, Oleg Grabar, who illustrated how patterns in architecture are able to dissolve space.

A Death Mask, one of her first works, was selected as the cover of Generation, the University's avant garde journal, as campus unrest over the Vietnam war escalated. Her Tattooed Porcelain Dolls were adopted by students protesting the U.S.'s use of napalm, causing disfiguration. "The curious tattooed porcelain pieces of Doner are rather disturbing truncated body parts, as if eaten away by some leper. These bizarre open-stomached puppets, tattooed like the natives of the Amazon, or exhibiting configurations resembling those of certain sea shells, their heads (when they have them) with eyes closed, moth half-open and brain visible, fall into the category of surrealistic objects, but with a surrealism filled with a sap which is naive, barbaric and young."

Oka Doner received a Bachelor of Science and Design from the University of Michigan (1966), a M.F.A. (1968), was Alumna-in-Residence (1990), received the Distinguished Alumna Award from the School of Art (1994) and was a Penny Stamps Distinguished Speaker (2008). She was awarded the honorary degree, Doctor of Arts (2016).

Her first student work, Masks, was exhibited in 1967 at the University of Michigan, and Oka Doner's Master of Fine Arts thesis show in 1968 was celebrated at the Rackham Galleries.

Many examples of her work can be found on campus, including Science Benches, commissioned by the University (1990). Other work can be found in the collection of the University of Michigan Museum of Art including the large, cast bronze figures by Oka Doner, Angry Neptune, Salacia and Strider, located outside the museum.

== Early career ==
Upon graduation in 1968, Oka Doner established a studio in downtown Ann Arbor behind the art gallery "Editions, Inc.," where physicist Lloyd Cross and sculptor Jerry Pethick were experimenting with holography. Using a krypton laser, they created the first art holograms. One of Oka Doner's sculptures was appropriated for this experiment. The "Ceramic Doll" opened in the world's first exhibition of holograms at the Cranbrook Academy Art in 1970.

NBC's cultural reporter, Aline Saarinen featured other ceramic dolls on the Today Show on November 4, 1969. These sculptures traveled to the Edinburgh College of Art in conjunction with the Festival in 1973. They were featured on the front page of the Financial Times in a review by art critic Marina Vaizey.

Oka Doner moved to Detroit and exhibited at the Gertrude Kasle Gallery in 1971. In 1975, a new body of work, Burial Pieces was laid out on the floor of Gallery 7, then a Cooperative Gallery of black artists, led by Charles McGee. It was the first of many installations that shed pedestals and traditional ways of displaying sculpture. A one-person show at the Detroit Institute of Arts followed in 1977. Works in Progress, also forsook conventional props. Oka Doner installed on the floor of the North Court thousands of pieces of clay depicting images of writing and seeds in the process of germinating. In 1979, the DIA initiated a small group exhibition, "Image and Object in Contemporary Sculpture," including Michele Oka Doner, Scott Burton, Dennis Oppenheim, and Terry Allen, which traveled to P.S. 1, New York. "To this viewer, the best work in the show is that of Michele Oka Doner, who makes fossilized relics of clap-bones, plants, primitive idols, and large pelvic-shaped structures that metamorphose into grisly chairs. She has elegantly translated these rudimentary forms into real objects of art."

== Public art ==
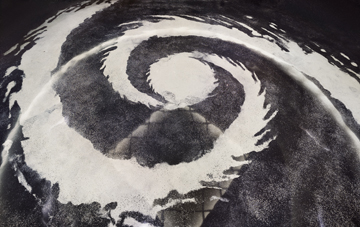
Galaxy, Miami International Airport 2009

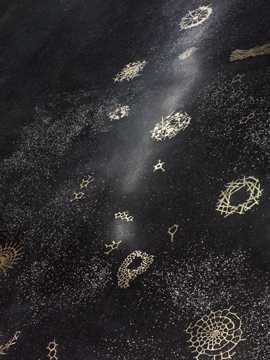
Cosmic (detail): A Walk on the Beach, Miami International Airport, 1995–2010

In 1981, Oka Doner moved to New York City and embarked on a series of public art installations. In 1987, she won a national competition sponsored by the MTA's Arts For Transit Program with Radiant Site a 165 ft. long wall for the Herald Square subway station in New York City. The late architect Morris Lapidus said of "Celestial Plaza," "By laying these forms at our feet, she encourages us to stop and search the sparkling expanse for landmarks just as we would search the night sky." This was the genesis for many installations including the River of Quintessence at the U.S. Courthouse in Laredo, Texas, and Flight at the Reagan National Airport in Washington D.C. For the Federal Courthouse in Gulfport, Mississippi, Oka Doner designed a security screen, Wave & Gate (2003).

=== Miami International Airport ===
Oka Doner's best known artwork is "A Walk on the Beach" (1995, 1999), and its extension, "A Walk on the Beach: Tropical Gardens" (1996–2010) at the Miami International Airport. It is composed of over 9000 bronzes embedded in terrazzo with mother-of-pearl. At one and quarter linear miles, it is one of the largest artworks in the world.

"Doner has chosen to express herself in public spaces, on a large scale…A Walk on the Beach…inspired by the marine flora and fauna of Florida is embedded into a ground sewn with inclusions of mother-of-pearl. More than walking on the beach, experiencing the piece is like being suspended in a celestial vault, surrounded by marine constellations and fossil comets, or rather walking along the bottom of an ocean where the milky way has become ship wreck. Doner has invented an astonishing, paradoxical map, where 'below' and 'above' are reversed, one overturned into the other; and yet the sense of wonder overcomes the vertigo of the upheaval of the natural order."

A Walk on the Beach has been adopted by the community as one of the "8 Wonders of Miami."

== Sculpture and exhibitions ==
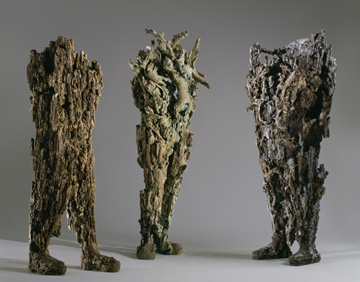
Strider, Salacia, Collossus, 2008 Collection: University of Michigan Museum of Art

In 2009–2010, Oka Doner installed SoulCatchers, approximately 400 shamanistic sculptures in the kiln room at the Nymphenburg Porcelain Manufactury, Munich, Germany. "The world itself has a soul, found in the human capacity of imagination. It manifests itself in dreams and fantasy, poetry and art."

Additional "SoulCatchers" were exhibited at the Marlborough Gallery, New York (2008) and Frederic Meijer Gardens and Sculpture Park in Grand Rapids, Michigan (2009).

Solo exhibitions of her work have been held at the Detroit Institute of Arts, Michigan; Germans Van Eck, Diane Brown, Art & Industrie, Willoughby Sharp and Marlborough Gallery in New York, Studio Stefania Miscetti in Rome; and Gloria Luria Gallery in Miami, Florida.

Recent solo exhibitions include,"The True Story of Eve," The John and Mable Ringling Museum of Art, Sarasota, FL, "Close Your Physical Eye," Manitoga Arts Center, Garrison, New York (2019); "New Works on Paper," Marlborough Gallery, New York (2019), " "How I Caught A Swallow in Mid-Air," at the Perez Art Museum Miami (2016), "Mysterium" at David Gill Gallery, London (2016), "Feasting on Bark," Marlborough Gallery, New York (2015), "The Shaman's Hut," Christie's gallery, New York (2014), "Neuration of the Genus," Dieu Donne Gallery, New York, NY, where she was interviewed by the artist Adam Fuss, and "Exhaling Gnosis" at Miami Biennale (2011). Her first video, A Walk on the Beach premiered at Art Basel Miami Beach (2011) in the public screenings "Art Video" program in SoundScape Park on the 7,000 square foot outdoor projection wall of the New World Center.

Oka Doner designed her first sets and costumes for Miami City Ballet's production of George Balanchine's "A Midsummer Nights Dream" (Spring, 2016 and Spring, 2019) Sets and costumes were inspired by images of undersea creatures photographed at the Marine Invertebrate Museum collection at the Rosenstiel School of Marine & Atmospheric Science at the University of Miami, Prof. Nancy Voss, Director. The images were also the subject of the book and e-book, Into the Mysterium, a Regan Arts book, also published at this time.

Additionally, Michele Oka Doner created a large-scale art installation, “Mangrove Retreat,” in 2015 for Art Basel Miami Beach using Sunbrella fabric.

== Collections (selection) ==
Her work is in collections worldwide, notably the Metropolitan Museum of Art, Whitney Museum of American Art, the Cooper-Hewitt, La Musée Des Artes Décoratifs, the Louvre, the Wolfsoniana in Genoa, the Art Institute of Chicago, the Virginia Museum, the St. Louis Museum, the Dallas Museum of Art, the University of Michigan Museum of Art, the Yale Art Gallery, Princeton University Art Museum, and the Pérez Art Museum Miami.

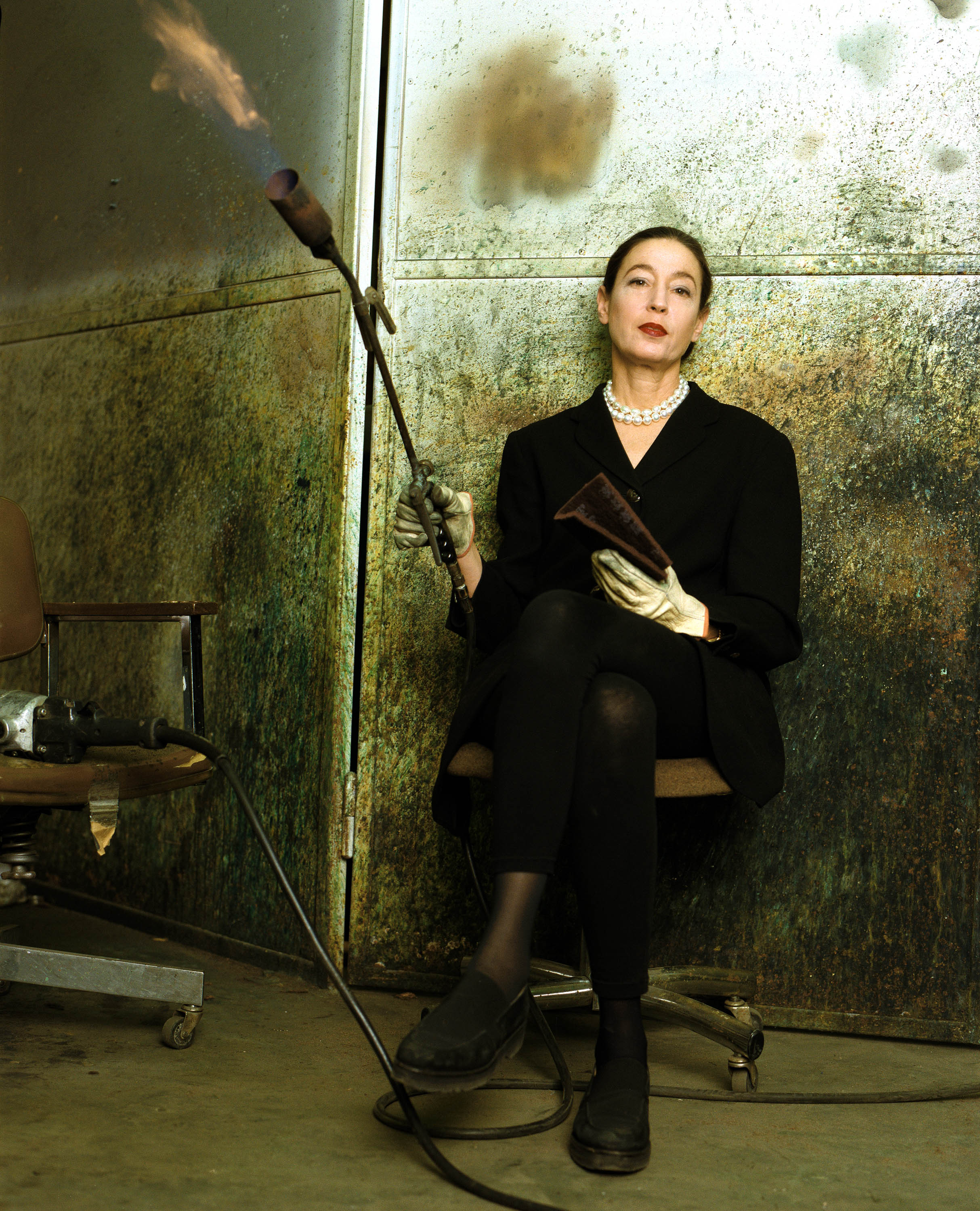
Jordan Doner portrait of Michele Oka Doner

== Recognition ==
Oka Doner has received many awards and honors, including:

- Guardian of the Great Miami Beach Banyan Tree by Proclamation, Mayor of the City of Miami Beach, 2021
- Artist In Residence, New York Botanical Garden, Bronx, New York, 2019
- Artist In Residence Manitoga, Garrison, New York, 2019
- Honorary Doctor of Fine Arts, University of Michigan, 2016
- John S. and James L. Knight Foundation Arts Challenge Grant, 2017. Artist Grant, 2015
- Legends Award, Pratt Institute, 2006
- Honorary Doctorate Degree in Fine Arts from the New York School of Interior Design, 2011
- Distinguished Alumni Award, University of Michigan, 1994
- Alumna In Residence, University of Michigan School of Art, 1990
- Artist in Residence (RAAR), Academy in Rome, 1987
- Michigan Potter's Association Ceramic Prize, Detroit Institute of Arts, 1969
- Standard Ceramic Company Award, 1968
- Lydia Winston Malbin Prize at the Detroit Institute of Arts, 1968

== Publications ==
Selected Books by and about the artist:

- 2019 – Doner, Michele Oka, Intuitive Alphabet, Miami: TRA Publishing, ISBN 978-0998693101
- 2017 – Doner, Michele Oka, Judith Thurman, Joseph Giovannini, Cynthia Nadelman, Gregory Volk, Everything Is Alive, New York: Regan Arts, ISBN 978-1682450840
- 2017 – Doner, Michele Oka, Intuitiva Alphabet, Collector's Edition, Miami: TRA Publishing, ISBN 978-0-9986931-3-2
- 2016 – Doner, Michele Oka. Essay: Prof. Nancy Voss. Into the Mysterium. New York: Regan Arts ISBN 9781942872061
- 2010 – Doner, Michele Oka. What is White. Limited Edition Artist Book. New York: Dieu Donne Press
- 2008 – Kuspit, Donald. HumanNature: The Figures of Michele Oka Doner. Design: Massimo Vignelli. Milan, New York: Edizioni Charta ISBN 978-8881586875
- 2007 – Doner, Michele Oka and Mitchell Wolfson, Jr.. Miami Beach: Blueprint of an Eden, New York: HarperCollins: Harper Design ISBN 978-0061346163
- 2005 – Doner, Michele Oka and Mitchell Wolfson Jr. Miami Beach: Blueprint of an Eden. Cologne, Berlin: Feierabend Unique Books ISBN 978-3899853308
- 2004 – Stump, Ulrike Meyer, Andrew Knoll, Michele Oka Doner, Arlene Raven, Dona Warner Michele Oka Doner: Workbook. New York: OKA Press ISBN 978-0976186403
- 2003 – Ramljak, Susanne, Arthur Danto, Morris Lapidus, Mitchell Wolfson Jr. Michele Oka Doner: Natural Seduction. New York, Manchester VT: Hudson Hills Press ISBN 9781555952150
