= Joseph Nathaniel French =

American architect

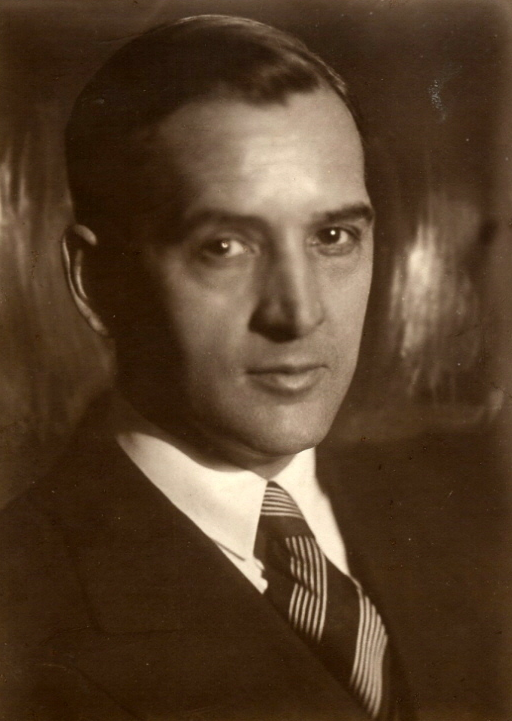
- French in Moscow in 1931
- Born: October 24, 1888; Boston, Massachusetts, U.S.
- Died: February 28, 1975 (aged 86); Livonia, Michigan, U.S.
- Other names: Joseph Nathaniel French, Sr.
- Education: Massachusetts Institute of Technology (1911)
- Occupation: Architect
- Employer: Albert Kahn Associates
- Spouses: Amie Gertrude Lathe (m. 1912–1921) Yolanda Christina Tandberg (m. 1926–1975)
- Children: 6

Joseph Nathaniel French, Sr. (October 24, 1888 – February 28, 1975) was an architect with Albert Kahn Associates from 1914 to 1967. He was the chief architect for the Fisher Building in Detroit, Michigan.

== Biography ==
He was born on October 24, 1888, in Boston, Massachusetts, to Joseph Brown Morse French (1854–1928) and Erlenia Helen Matilda Faulkner (1857–1939). He had four sisters: Frances Gertrude French (1877–1878) who died of cholera, Emma Matilda French (1879–1884), Nettie Eveline French (1886–1896) and Marion Ruth French (1897–1982). French attended the Massachusetts Institute of Technology, and graduated in 1911.

He first married Amie Gertrude Lathe (1885–1921), May 14, 1912 at St. Stephens Episcopal Church in Boston. He was put in charge of the last stages of construction on Henry Ford's Fair Lane residence in Dearborn, Michigan in 1913. In 1914 he started work for Albert Kahn's firm in Detroit as a draftsman, and then as an architect. By 1916 he was living at 2098 Woodward Avenue in Detroit. On June 10, 1921, his wife Amie died. On June 8, 1926, he married Yolanda Christina Tandberg (1902–2003). Yolanda was the daughter of Thorvald Martin Tandberg (1874-1970) and Alvilde Marie Magdalene Naess (1875-1933) of Norway. She was 14 years younger than Joseph. They had several children, including Joseph Nathaniel French, Jr. While at Kahn he was chief architect for the Fisher Building in 1928.

From 1930 to 1932 he worked at the Albert Kahn Associates Moscow office with twenty-four other Kahn engineers and architects. One of his projects was the steel work of the General Motors Futurama building at the 1939 New York World's Fair. He worked on the design of the Chrysler plant near Kansas City, Missouri.

He died on February 28, 1975, in Livonia, Michigan. He was buried in Roseland Park Cemetery at 29001 Woodward Avenue, Berkley, Michigan.
