= Alvin D. Loving =

African-American abstract expressionist painter (1935 - 2005)

Alvin D. Loving Jr.
- Born: September 19, 1935; Detroit, Michigan
- Died: June 21, 2005 (aged 69); New York, New York
- Education: University of Illinois Champagne- Urbana (BA)University of Michigan (MFA)
- Known for: Painting
- Movement: Material abstraction, Geometric abstraction

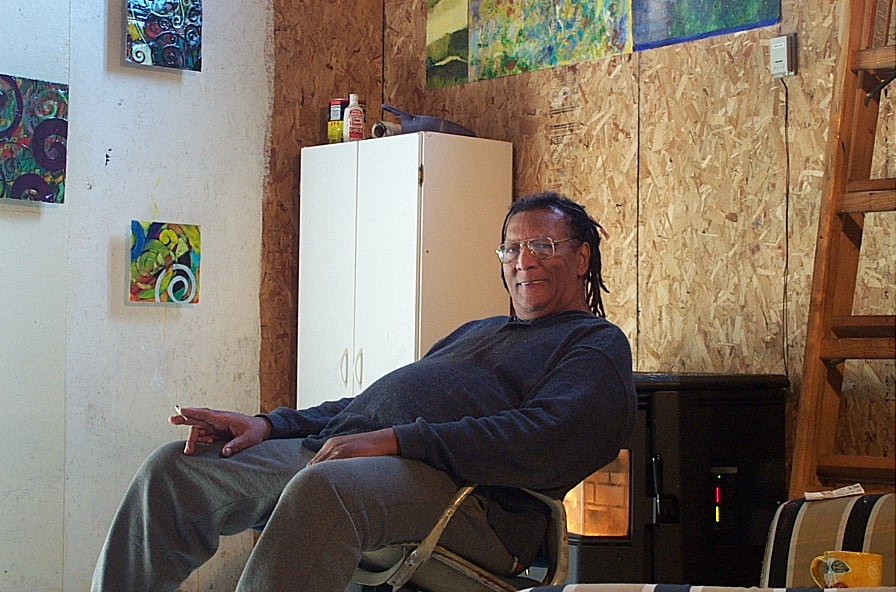
Alvin D. Loving in studio 2002

Alvin D. Loving Jr. (September 19, 1935 – June 21, 2005), better known as Al Loving, was an African-American abstract expressionist painter. His work is known for hard-edge abstraction, dyed fabric paintings, and large paper collages, all exploring complicated color relationships.

== Biography ==
Alvin Demar Loving Jr. was born on September 19, 1935, in Detroit, Michigan. Loving earned a BFA from the University of Illinois at Urbana-Champaign in 1963 and an MFA from the University of Michigan, Ann Arbor. His mentor at the University of Michigan was Al Mullen, who helped him get involved with the Once Group organization. In 1968 Loving moved to New York City, where he moved into the infamous Hotel Chelsea.

Within a year of moving to New York City, Loving had his first solo show at the Whitney Museum of American Art. He received National Endowment for the Arts fellowships in 1970, 1974, and 1984. In 1986 Loving was awarded a Guggenheim Fellowship. Loving created large-scale commissioned public works throughout his career; a 208' x 80' mural painting A Message to Demar and Lauri (1972) on The First National Bank Building in Detroit, Michigan (removed 1989), a 54' x 7' painting New Morning 1 (1973) for the Empire State Collection in Albany, New York, a ceramic mural Detroit New Morning (1987) in one of Detroit's People Mover stations and another Life, Growth, Continuity (1998) in the David Adamany Library at Wayne State University. In 1996, he created a collage painting Sacramento New Morning for the Sacramento Convention Center, and in 2001 he designed 70 stained-glass windows and mosaic walls for the Broadway Junction subway station in Brooklyn.

Loving exhibited steadily throughout his life in solo and group exhibitions at numerous venues, including the Museum of Fine Arts, Boston; Studio Museum in Harlem; Neuberger Museum of Art, Purchase, New York; Fondation Maeght, Saint-Paul-de-Vence, France; and PS1 Contemporary Art Center, Queens, New York.

Loving died on June 21, 2005, in New York, New York.

== Artistic style ==
=== Hard-edge abstraction ===
Untitled (1975) at the Metropolitan Museum of Art in 2022

In the 1960s, Loving grew increasingly interested in Josef Albers's paintings of squares within squares. In an interview, he explained: "For me at the time, it was about painting the square until it was 'enough,' and that meant until it obtained form. The square that I started with would always be gone; only I knew it was a square, that that reference was there. That freed me to just paint and let things evolve...[The square] was pure energy and focus.” These geometric abstractions conveyed the brilliance of refracted light; they were not just experiments in color. Loving would often make polyhedrons of the same size, with different colors, and hang them together in different arrangements on the wall. The result was sometimes dozens of canvases stretching out over several feet; to view an entire composition would take time, more than just a glance, making his paintings a powerful expression of time, too. Loving's geometric paintings were featured in his first solo exhibition at the Whitney Museum of American Art. Loving later abandoned hard-edged abstraction painting.

=== Dyed fabric paintings ===
Inspired by a visit to the Whitney Museum of American Art's exhibition Abstract Design in American Quilts, in the early 1970s, Loving began to experiment with fabric constructions. He started hanging strips of canvas from the walls and ceilings, playing with our perception of pictorial and sculptural ideals. Then, he reattached the fragments together with a sewing machine, creating large flowing fabric constructions. At first he painted the pieces of canvas, but later switched to dying the fabric. Other artists, including Sam Gilliam, Alan Shields, and Richard Moch, were also using the sewing machine at this time to create fabric constructions. In fact, Loving considered himself within the context of abstract expressionism at this phase in his career; though he was not a painter but a material abstractionist.

=== Large paper collages ===
In the 1970s, Loving began to integrate other materials into his constructions, such as corrugated cardboard and rag paper. Loving quickly took a liking to the casualness of tearing cardboard and gluing it onto other pieces; in fact, he considered this practice abstract expressionist as well. Unlike the dyed fabric paintings, the large paper collages gave him a sense of freedom because he was trekking through uncharted territory. Loving integrated circles and spirals into these collages as a nod to his African roots and as an expression of growth and continued life. In the piece, Perpetual Motion (1994)(DASNY), Loving integrated materials such as cardboard and print. The cardboard is cut and overlapped to form a series of spirals. Each spiral has been carefully painted and placed to create dynamic color relationships. They do not have conventional matting under them, glass to cover them or frames to surround them: instead they cling flatly to the wall. Sandra Yolles, reviewing an exhibition in 1990, explained "Loving’s work is about earth, wind, fire, and water: some pieces might be considered atmospheric maps of life at full blast—stretching the possibilities of the human spirit by delineating its directions, currents, and eddies.'”

== Exhibition history ==
=== Solo exhibitions ===
Alvin Loving has had several solo exhibitions throughout his life.

Alvin Loving at the Gertrude Kasle Gallery in Detroit (June 15 – July 7, 1969), Alvin Loving: Paintings at the Whitney Museum of American Art in New York (December 19, 1969 – January 25, 1970), Alvin Loving at William Zierler, Inc. in New York (March 11 – April 1, 1973), at the Studio Museum in Harlem, New York (1977), Al Loving: Departures at the Studio Museum in Harlem, New York (February 23 – June 9, 1986), Al Loving: Maker of Art at the National Academy of Sciences in Washington, D.C. (April 10 – June 15, 1991), Al Loving: Material Abstraction at June Kelly Gallery in New York (November 5 – December 1, 1992), Al Loving in the Nineties: The Collaged Wallworks at the Fine Arts Center Galleries of the University of Rhode Island (January 21 – March 8, 1997), Al Loving: Detwiller Visiting Artist at the Art Gallery of the Williams Center for the Arts at Lafayette College in Pennsylvania (February 6 – March 1, 1998), Al Loving: Color Constructs at the Neuberger Museum of Art at Purchase College in New York, (September 27, 1998 – January 24, 1999), Al Loving: Elegant Ideas at the G.R. N’Namdi Gallery in Michigan (April 30 – June 4, 1999), Al Loving: Lighter Than Air at the G.R. N’Namdi Gallery in Chicago (September 9 – October 29, 2004), Al Loving: Affirmations of Life at the Kenkeleba House in New York (December 6, 2005 – January 11, 2006), Al Loving: Torn Canvas at the Gary Snyder Gallery in New York (November 8 – December 29, 2012), Al Loving at the Garth Greenan Gallery in New York (May 21—June 27, 2015), Spiral Play: Loving in the '80s at Art+Practice in Los Angeles (April 22 – July 29, 2017) and at the Baltimore Museum of Art (October 18, 2017 – April 15, 2018), Space, Time, Light at Garth Greenan Gallery, NY ()ct 25- Dec 21, 2018, Al Loving: Empreor's Clothing at Garth Greenan Gallery in NY (March 24- May 7, 2022.

=== Group exhibitions ===
1968

- Afro-American Art, Detroit Institute of Arts
- National Acrylic Show, Eastern Michigan University, Ypsilanti, Michigan

1969

- Afro-American Art After 1950, Brooklyn College Art Gallery, City University of New York
- 5+1, Art Gallery, State University of New York, Stony Brook, October 16–November 8; Art Museum, Princeton University, New Jersey, November 12–23 curated by Frank Bowling

1970

- Lamp Black: African-American Artists, New York and Boston, Museum of Fine Arts, Boston, May 19–June 23
- L’art vivant aux États-Unis, Fondation Maeght, Saint-Paul, France, July 16–September 30

1971

- Contemporary Black Artists in America, Whitney Museum of American Art, New York, April 6–May 16
- The De Luxe Show, DeLuxe Theatre, Houston, August 15–September 12

1972

- 1972 Annual Exhibition: Contemporary American Painting, Whitney Museum of American Art, New York, January 25–March 19

1973

- 1973 Biennial Exhibition: Contemporary American Art, Whitney Museum of American Art, New York, January 10–March 18

1975

- Image, Color, and Form: Recent Paintings by Eleven Americans, Toledo Museum of Art, Ohio, January 12–February 9
- 34th Biennial of Contemporary American Painting, Corcoran Gallery of Art, Washington, D.C., February 22–April 6
- Selected Works from the Dillard Collection: An Exhibition of Works on Paper from the Weatherspoon Art Gallery, University of North Carolina, Greensboro, Montgomery Museum of Fine Arts, Alabama, April 15–May 18

1977

- '75, ’76, ’77: Painting, Part I, Sarah Lawrence College Art Gallery, Bronxville, New York, February 19–March 10; American Foundation for the Arts, Miami, April–May; Contemporary Arts Center, Cincinnati, June–July

1979

- Another Generation, The Studio Museum in Harlem, New York

1981

- Afro-American Abstraction, Los Angeles Municipal Art Gallery, July 1–August 30

1982

- Color, Material, Form: Bowling, Loving, Mohr, Currier Museum of Art, Manchester, New Hampshire, January 9–February 14

1983

- Seven American Artists, Cleveland Museum of Art, January 11–February 13
- New Work, New York: Newcastle Salutes New York, Newcastle Polytechnic Gallery, Newcastle upon Tyne, United Kingdom, October 8–November 4

1984–1985

- Since the Harlem Renaissance: 50 Years of Afro-American Art, Center Gallery, Bucknell University, Lewisburg, Pennsylvania, April 13, 1984 – November 1, 1985

1985

- Recent Acquisitions, The Studio Museum in Harlem, New York

1987

- New York, New Venue, Mint Museum of Art, Charlotte, North Carolina, April 10–May 31

1989

- The Appropriate Object: Maren Hassinger, Richard Hunt, Oliver Jackson, Alvin Loving, Betye Saar, Raymond Saunders, John Scott, Albright-Knox Gallery, Buffalo, March 5–April 23

1990

- Legacies: African-American Artists, New Jersey Center for Visual Arts, Summit, September 16–October 27

1991

- The Search for Freedom: African-American Abstract Painting, 1945–1975, Kenkeleba Gallery, New York, May 19–July 14

2000

- An Exuberant Bounty: Prints and Drawings by African Americans, Philadelphia Museum of Art, February 5–April 16

2002

- Six American Masters, Sugar Hill Art Center, New York, May 17–June 27
- No Greater Love: Abstraction, Jack Tilton/Anna Kustera Gallery, New York, September 12–October 12

2003

- Layers of Meaning: Collage and Abstraction in the Late 20th Century, Pennsylvania Academy of the Fine Arts, Philadelphia, February 8–April 27

2004

- Something to Look Forward to, Phillips Museum of Art, Franklin & Marshall College, Lancaster, Pennsylvania, March 26–June 27

2005

- The Chemistry of Color: African-American Artists in Philadelphia, 1970–1990, Pennsylvania Academy of the Fine Arts, Philadelphia, January 11–April 10

2006

- Energy/Experimentation: Black Artists and Abstraction, 1964–1980, The Studio Museum in Harlem, New York, April 5–July 2
- Full House: Views of the Whitney's Collection at 75, Whitney Museum of American Art, New York, June 29–September 3

2006–2007

- High Times, Hard Times: New York Painting, 1967–1975, Weatherspoon Art Museum, University of North Carolina, Greensboro, August 6–October 15, 2006; American University Museum at the Katzen Arts Center, American University, Washington, D.C., November 21, 2006 – January 21, 2007; National Academy Museum, New York, February 13–April 22

2008–2009

- New Acquisitions: African-American Masters Collection, Sheldon Art Museum, Lincoln, Nebraska, December 16, 2008 – March 2, 2009

2009

- Target Practice: Painting Under Attack, 1949–1978, Seattle Art Museum, June 25–September 7

2011

- Paper Trails: Selected Works from the Collection, 1934–2001, Metropolitan Museum of Art, New York, July 19–November 27

2012

- Full Spectrum: Prints from the Brandywine Workshop, Philadelphia Museum of Art, September 7–November 25

2015

- New Acquisitions, Rose Art Museum, Brandeis University, Waltham, Massachusetts, February 11–June 7
- America Is Hard to See, Whitney Museum of American Art, New York, May 1–September 27

2016

- Marrakech Biennale 6, Morocco, February 24–May 8

2019

- Abstraction, Color, and Politics: The 1960s and 1970s, University of Michigan Museum of Art, Ann Arbor, Michigan, June 8, 2019–February 9, 2020
- Collection Ensemble, University of Michigan Museum of Art, Ann Arbor, Michigan, April 2–present
- Pattern, crime & Decoration, Le Consortium, France, Dijon.

== Collections ==
Loving's work can be found in prominent collections in America, including the following:

- Akron Art Museum, Ohio
- Convention Center Philadelphia, PA
- Crystal Bridges Museum of American Art, Bentonville, Arkansas
- Currier Museum of Art, Manchester, New Hampshire
- Detroit Institute of Arts
- Everson Museum of Art, Syracuse, New York
- Governor Nelson A. Rockefeller Empire State Plaza Art Collection, Albany, New York
- Guild Hall Museum, East Hampton, New York
- Herbert F. Johnson Museum of Art, Cornell University, Ithaca, New York
- Krannert Art Museum, University of Illinois, Urbana-Champaign
- Library of Congress, Print Division
- Metropolitan Museum of Art
- Montclair Art Museum, New Jersey
- Museum of African-American Art, Detroit
- Museum of Fine Arts, Boston
- Museum of Modern Art
- National Gallery of Art
- Newark Museum, New Jersey
- New Jersey State Museum, Trenton
- Norton Museum of Art, West Palm Beach, Florida
- Pennsylvania Academy of the Fine Arts, Philadelphia
- Pérez Art Museum, Miami
- Philadelphia Museum of Art
- Phillips Museum of Art, Franklin & Marshall College, Lancaster, PA
- Rose Art Museum, Brandeis University
- Sheldon Museum of Art, Lincoln, Nebraska
- The Studio Museum in Harlem, New York
- Toledo Museum of Art, Ohio
- Tucson Museum of Art
- University of Michigan Museum of Art, Ann Arbor
- Francis Lehman Loeb Art Center, Vassar College
- Virginia Museum of Fine Arts, Richmond
- Walker Art Center, Minneapolis
- Weatherspoon Art Museum, University of North Carolina, Greensboro
- Whitney Museum of American Art, New York

== Notable artworks in permanent collections ==
- Rational Irrationalism (1969) Whitney Museum of American Art
- Cube 27 (1970) Museum of Fine Arts, Boston
- Untitled #32 (ca. 1975) Pérez Art Museum Miami, Florida
- Perpetual Motion (1994) York College, City University of New York
