= Fair Lane =

Historic house in Michigan, United States

Coordinates: 42°18′51.1″N 83°13′56.1″W

- U.S. National Register of Historic Places
- U.S. National Historic Landmark District
- Michigan State Historic Site
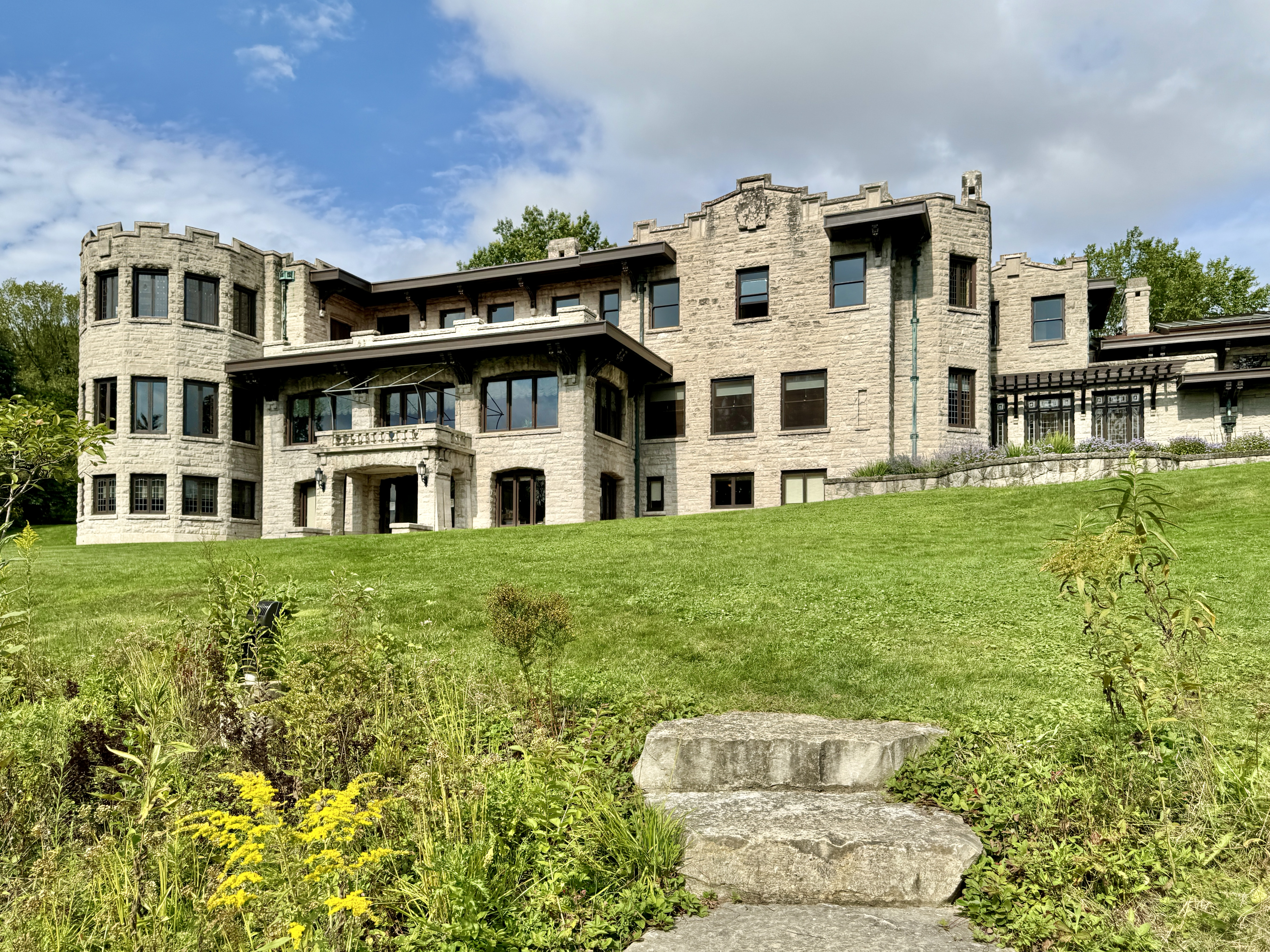
- Fair Lane from the Rouge River side
- Interactive map showing Fair Lane's location
- Location: Dearborn, Michigan
- Built: 1913–1915
- Architect: Joseph N. French, William Van Tine, Marion Mahony Griffin, Frank Lloyd Wright, Jens Jensen.
- Architectural style: Baronial, Prairie
- NRHP reference No.: 66000399

Significant dates
- Added to NRHP: November 13, 1966
- Designated NHLD: November 13, 1966
- Designated MSHS: February 18, 1958

Fair Lane is the former estate of Ford Motor Company founder Henry Ford and his wife, Clara Bryant Ford, in Dearborn, Michigan, United States. It was named after an area in Cork, Ireland, where Ford's adoptive grandfather, Patrick Ahern, was born. The 1,300-acre (530 ha) estate along the River Rouge included a large limestone house, an electrical power plant on the dammed river, a greenhouse, a boathouse, riding stables, a children's playhouse, a treehouse, and extensive landmark gardens designed by Chicago landscape architect Jens Jensen.

The residence and part of the estate grounds are open to the public as a historical landscape and house museum, and preserved as a National Historic Landmark. Part of the estate grounds are preserved as a university nature study area.

== Architecture ==
Frank Lloyd Wright participated in the initial design. However, after Wright fled to Europe with his mistress Mamah Borthwick, one of his assistant architects, Marion Mahony Griffin, one of the first female architects in America, revised and completed the design according to her own interpretation of the Prairie Style. Henry Ford and his wife took a trip to Europe and, on their return, dismissed Griffin and used William H. Van Tine to add English Manor house details. In 1913, architect Joseph Nathaniel French was brought in to work on the final stages of the residence, completed in 1915.

The 31,000-square-foot (2,900 m^{2}) house, with 56 rooms, was considered befitting, but less grand than other great houses and mansions of the era in America. It included an indoor pool and bowling alley. The pool is now covered and serves as an event and meeting space. It had formerly housed a restaurant.

== Landscape ==
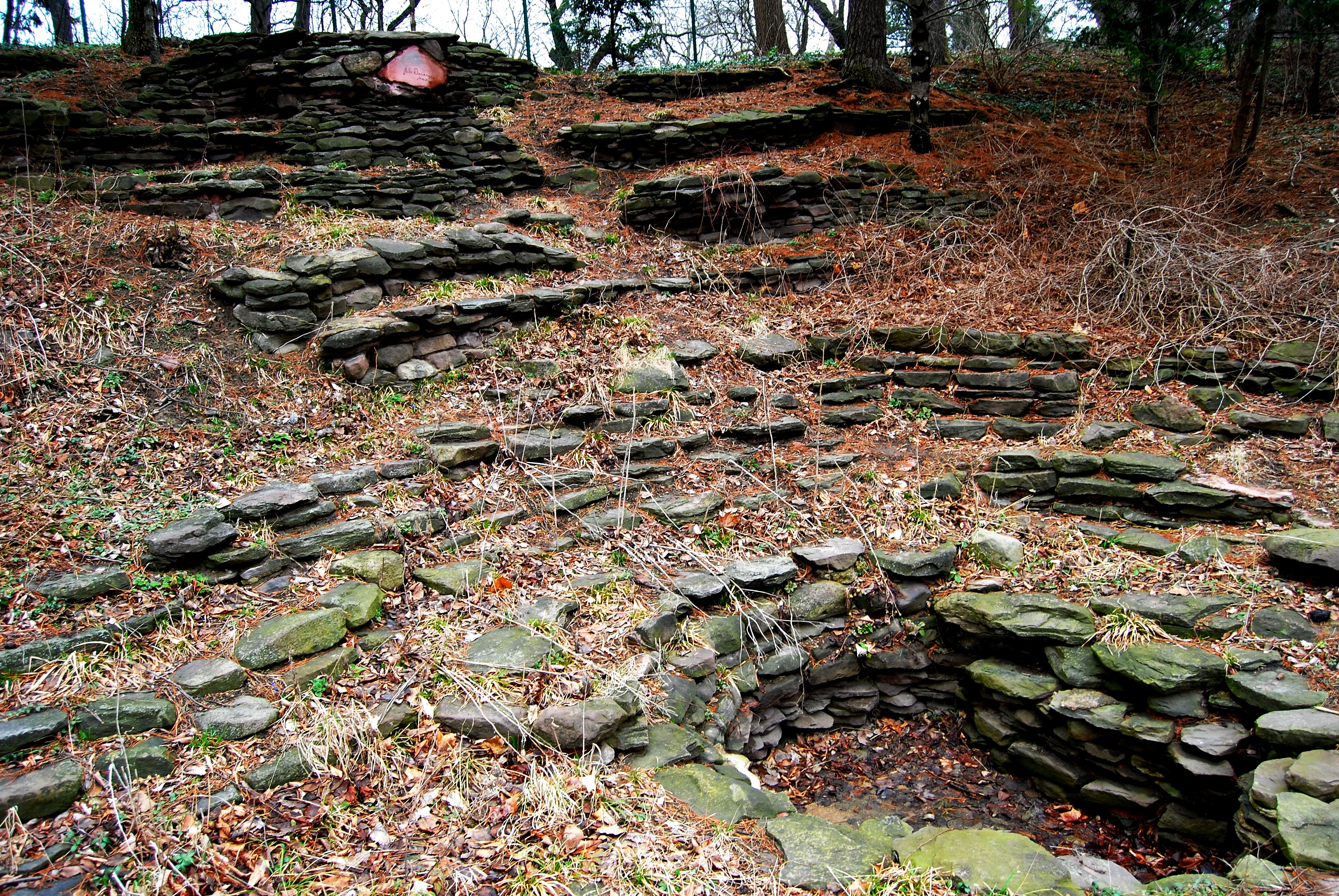
John Burroughs grotto, Henry Ford Estate

The powerhouse had its cornerstone laid by Thomas Alva Edison. The building included the estate's garage and, on the upper level, a laboratory where Ford worked on engine designs. It is also built of limestone in the Prairie Style. The hydropower not only powered the estate, but a part of the town of Dearborn as well.

Jens Jensen employed his "delayed view" approach in designing the arrival at the residence. Instead of proceeding straight to the house or even providing a view of it, the entrance drive leads visitors through the estate's dense woodland areas. Bends in the drive, planted with large trees on the inside arc of the curves, gives a feeling of a natural reason for the turn, and obscures any long view. Suddenly, the visitor is propelled out of the forest and into the open space where the residence is presented fully in view in front of them. The idea of wandering was one which Jensen featured in almost all of his designs. Expansive meadows and gardens make up the larger landscape, with naturalistic massings of flowers surrounding the house. The largest axial meadow, the "Path of the Setting Sun", is aligned so that, on the summer solstice, the setting sun glows through a precise parting of the trees at the meadow's western end. The boathouse, with stonework cliffs designed by Jensen, allowed Ford to travel on the Rouge River in his electric boat.

== Museum ==
The estate was donated to the University of Michigan in 1957 for a new Dearborn campus. The staff's former houses and a pony barn are used by the University of Michigan–Dearborn. The main house, powerhouse, garage and 72 acres (0.29 km^{2}) of land were operated as a museum, while a restaurant occupied the former indoor swimming pool natatorium until the University closed Fair Lane to the public in 2010. In 2013 the stewardship of the estate was transferred to the same non-profit group that operates the lakeside Edsel and Eleanor Ford House, with financial help from the Ford family.

When Fair Lane reopens to the public in 2027, it is expected to address Ford's antisemitism and The Dearborn Independent.

== Names ==
The private rail car of Henry and Clara Ford, named "Fair Lane", was kept on standby at the Ford siding of the Michigan Central Railroad in Dearborn. The Ford Fairlane automobile model, sold between 1955 and 1970 in America, and between 1959 and 2007 in Australia, was named after the Fair Lane estate.

== Gallery ==
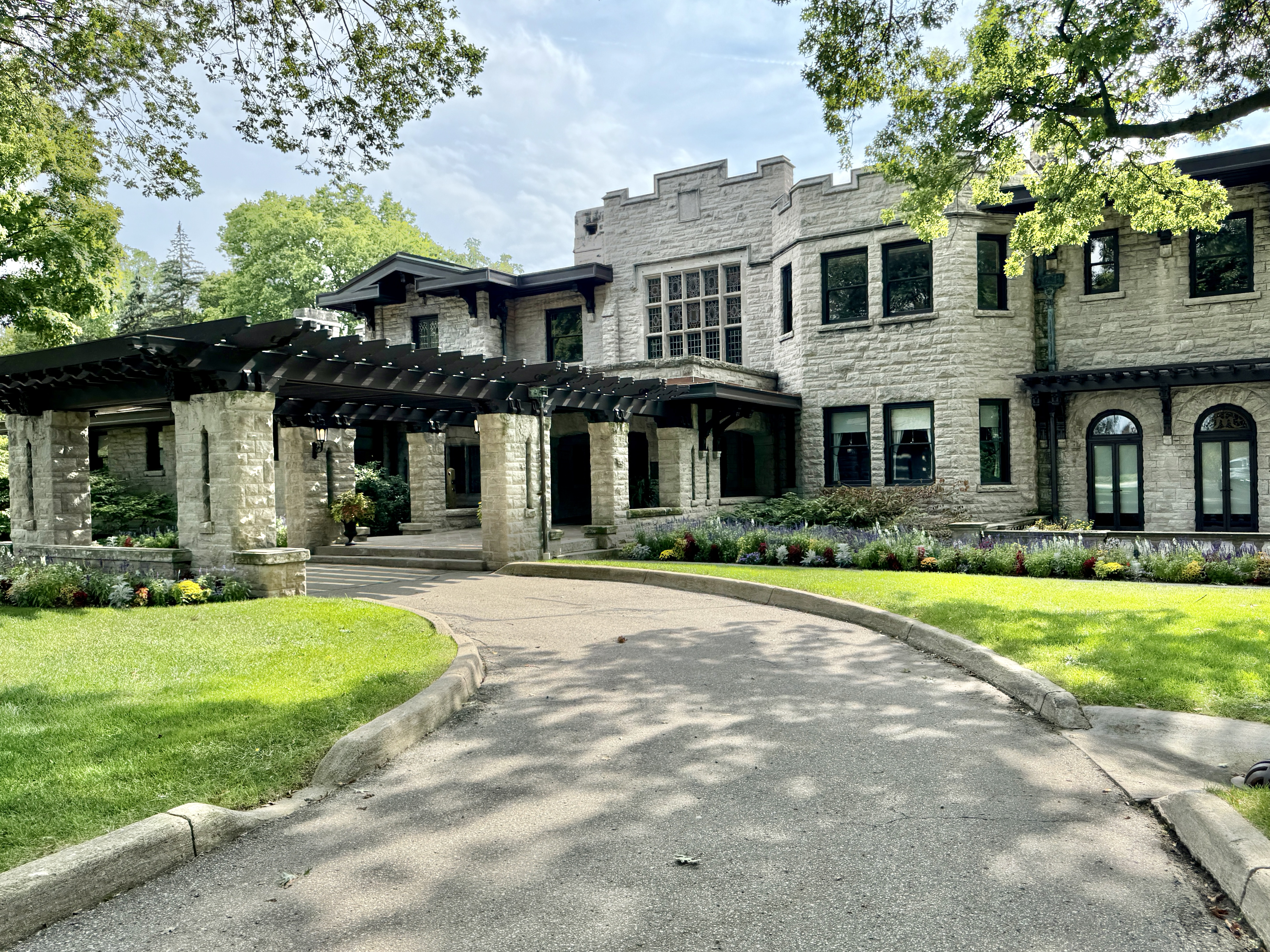
Northeast side

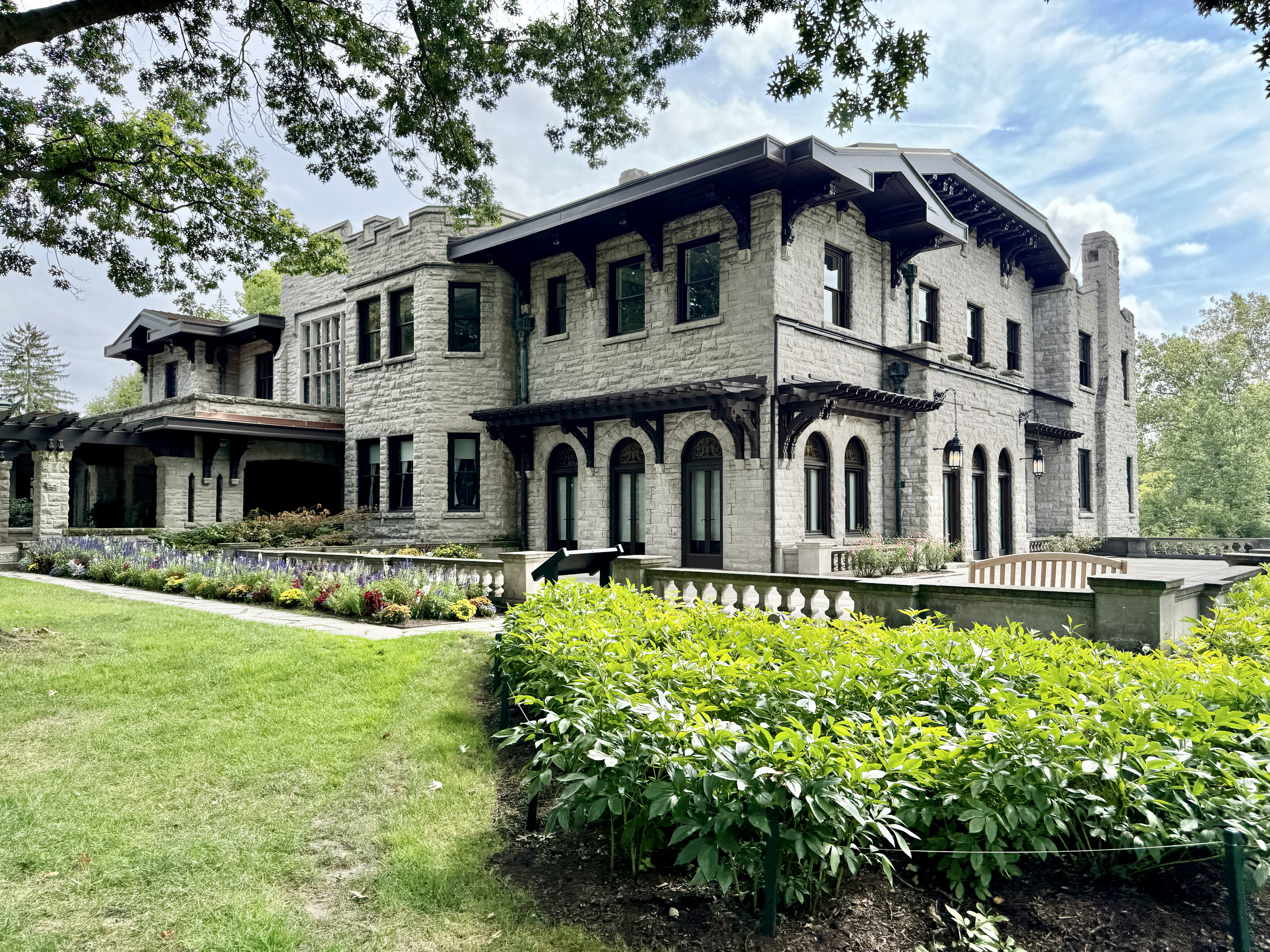
Northern corner

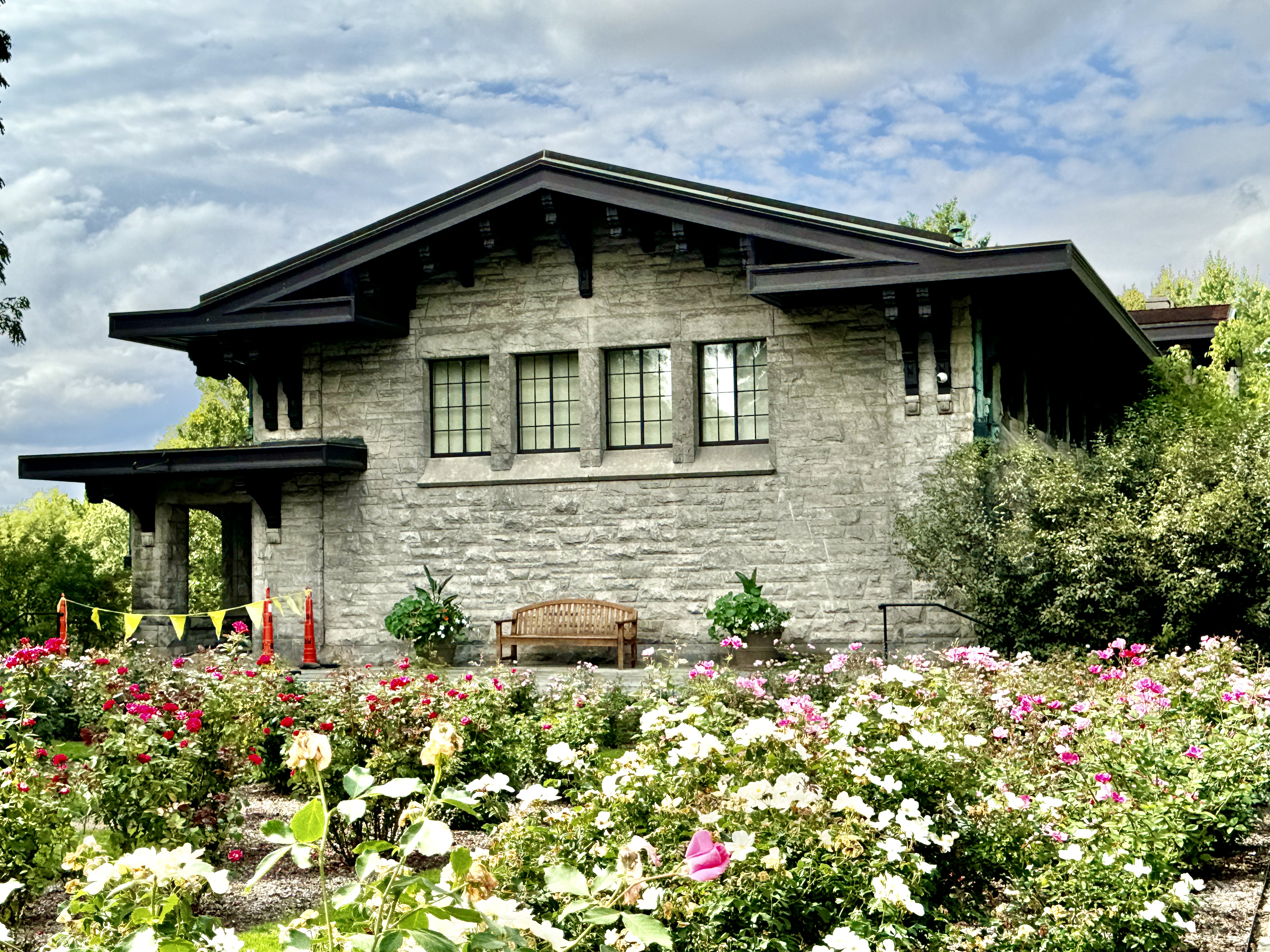
South side

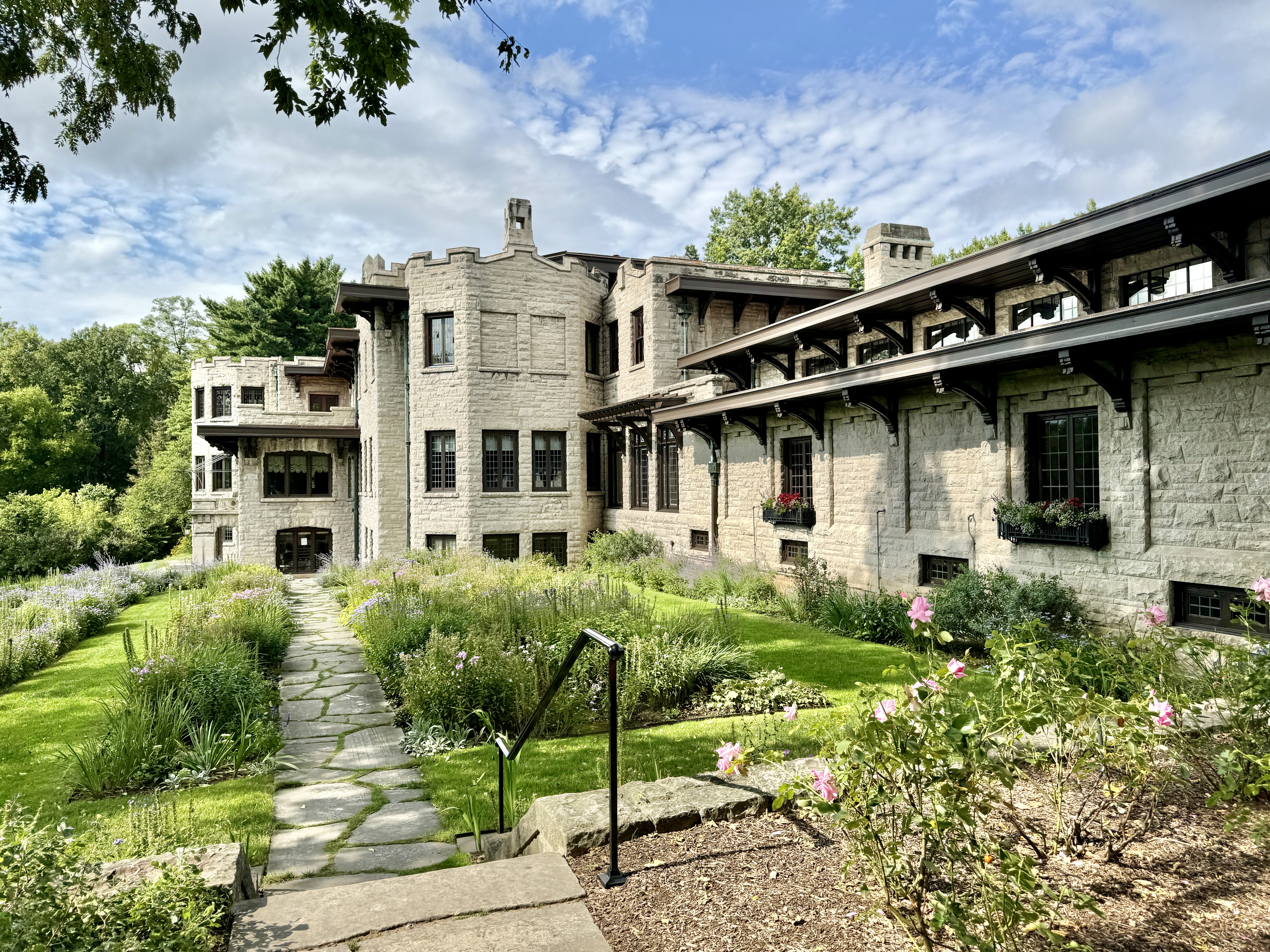
Blue Garden

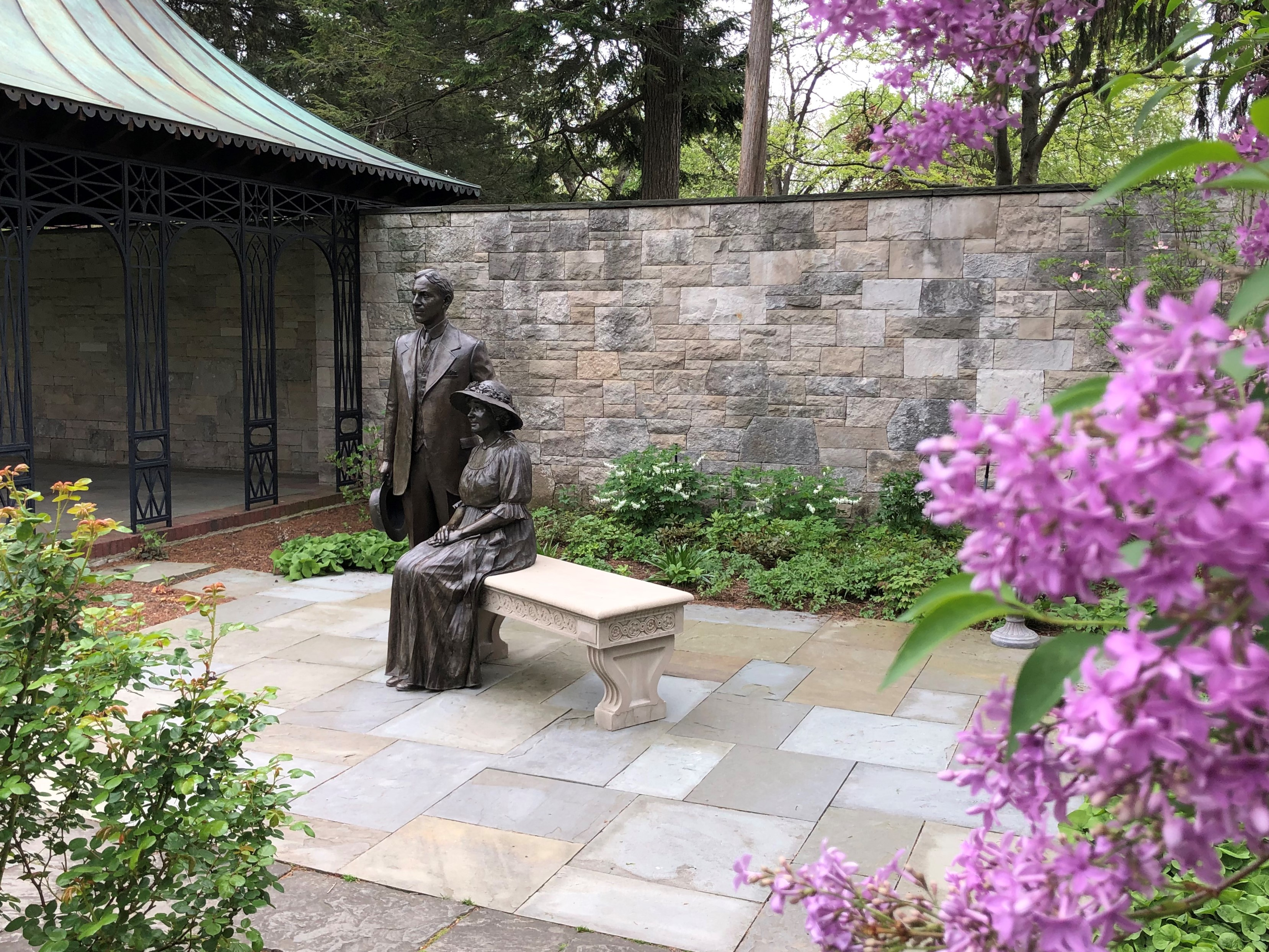
Henry and Clara Ford Statues

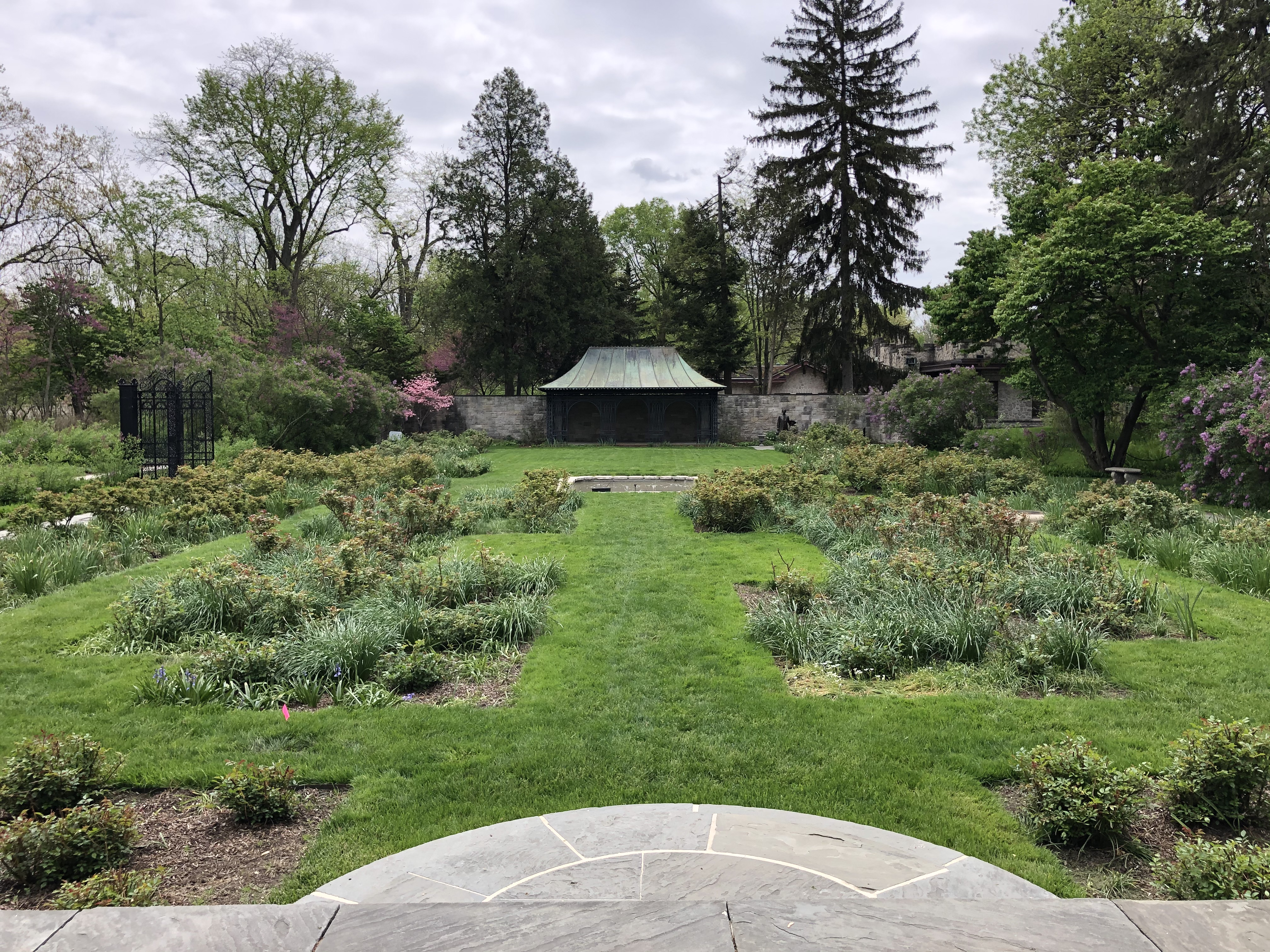
Early Rose Garden

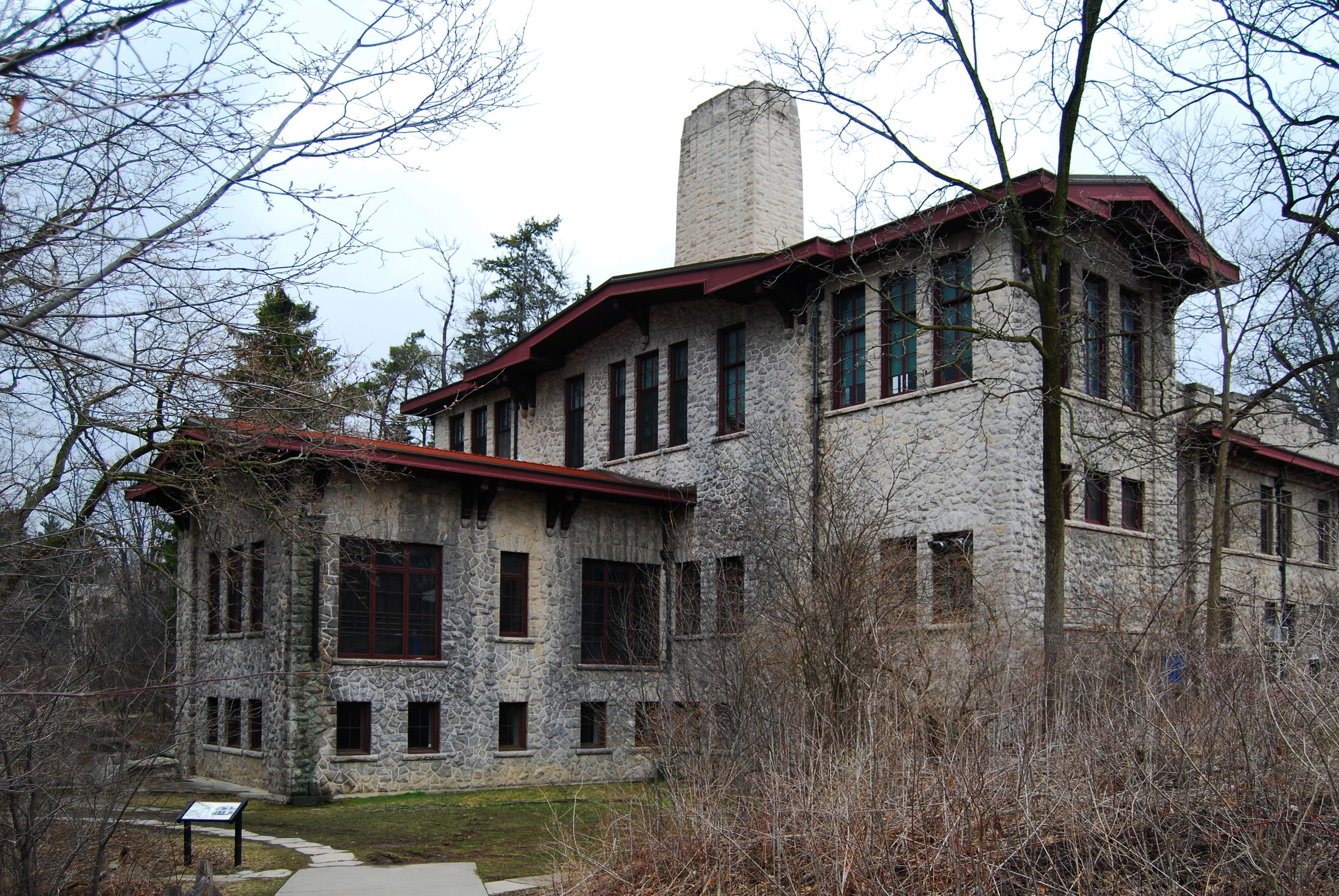
Power house

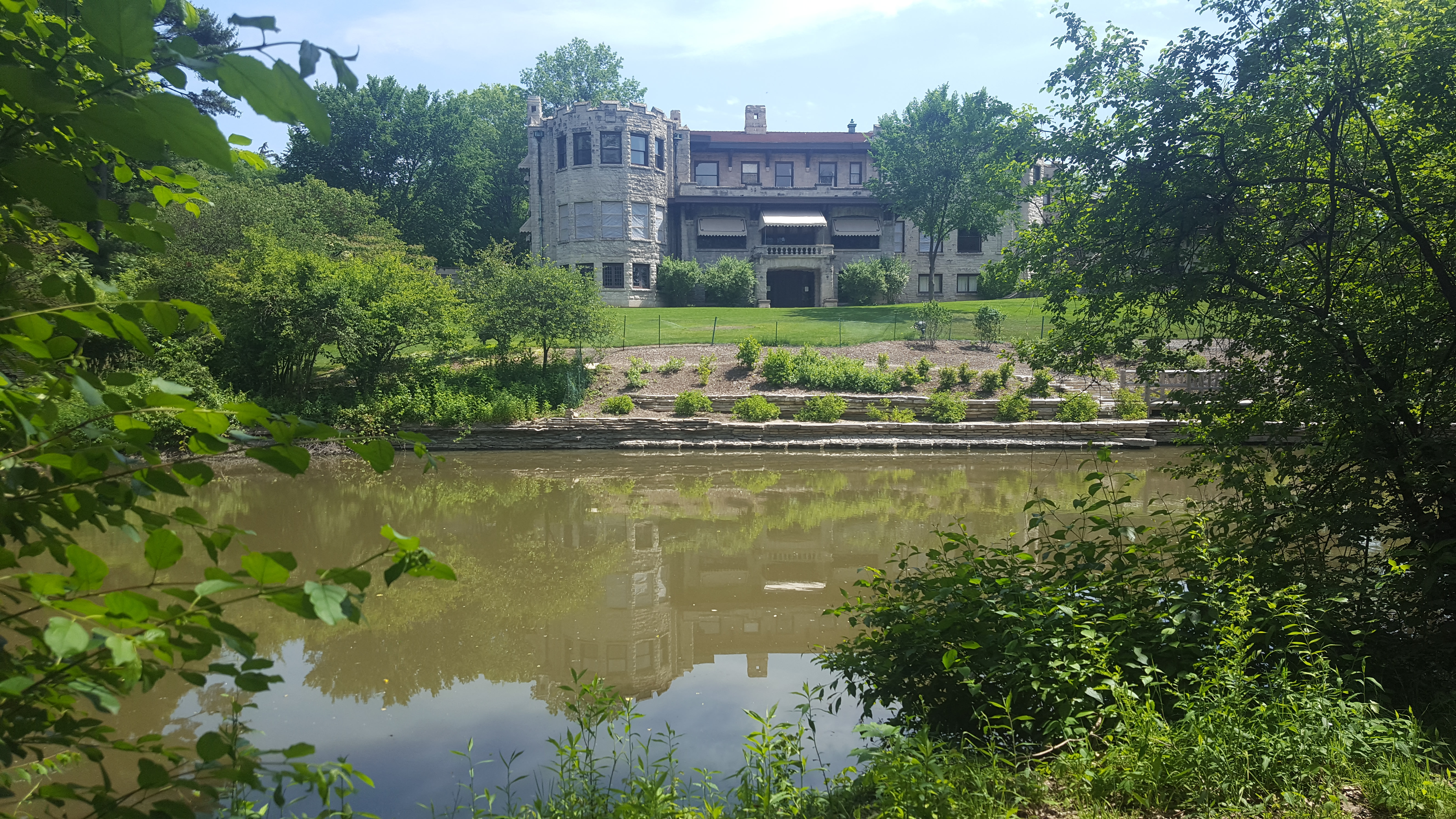
View from across the Rouge River

== See also ==
- Architecture of metropolitan Detroit
- Boston-Edison Historic District
- Tourism in metropolitan Detroit
- List of National Historic Landmarks in Michigan
- National Register of Historic Places listings in Wayne County, Michigan
