= Fisher Building =

Building in Detroit, Michigan

- U.S. National Register of Historic Places
- U.S. National Historic Landmark
- Michigan State Historic Site
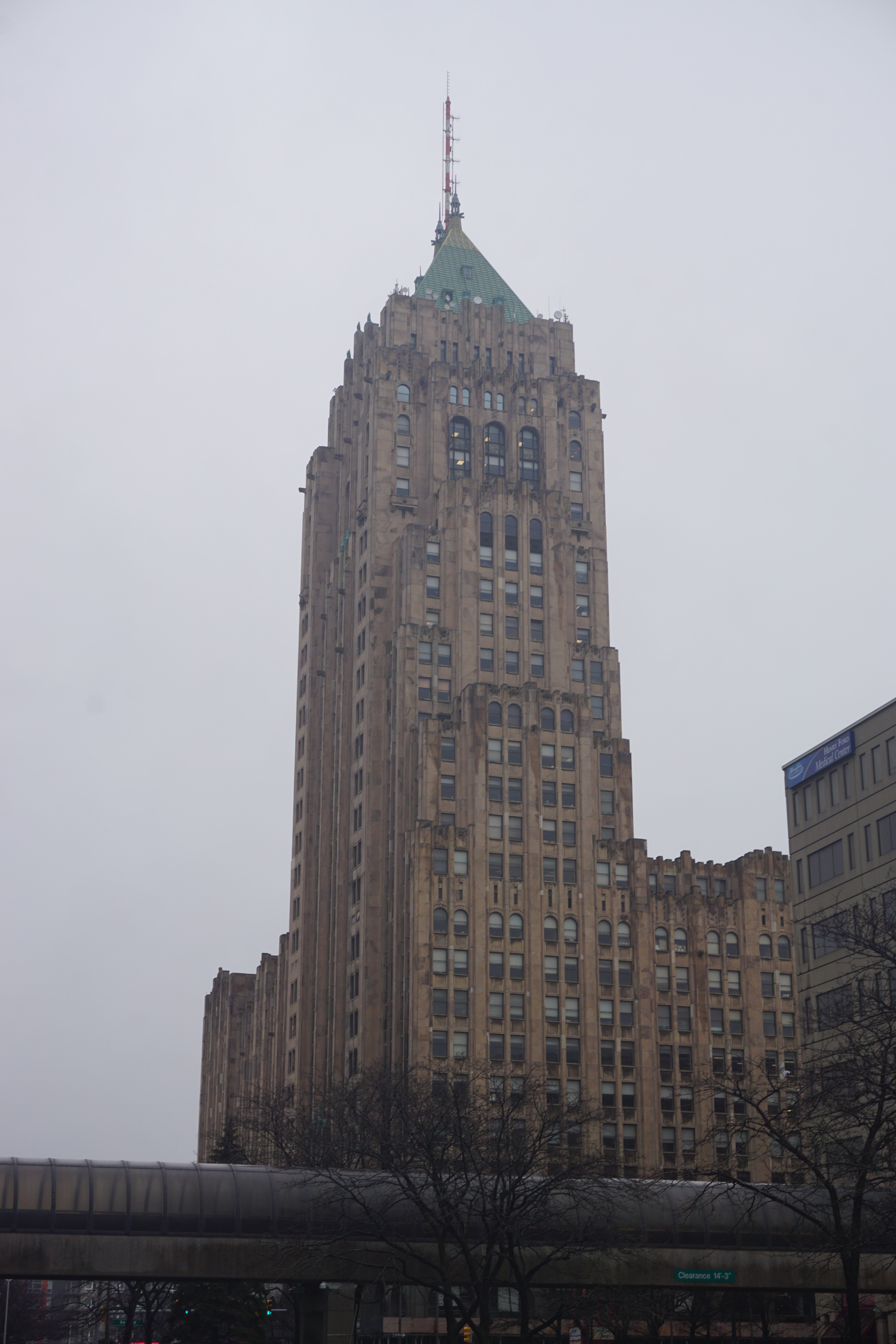
- Fisher Building in December 2021

- Location within Michigan Location within the United States
- Interactive map
- Location: 3011 W. Grand Blvd. Detroit, Michigan
- Coordinates: 42°22′9.5″N 83°4′37″W
- Area: 486,991 square feet (45,242.9 m^{2})
- Architect: Albert Kahn Associates with Joseph Nathaniel French as chief architect
- Architectural style: Art Deco, Mayan Revival
- NRHP reference No.: 07000847

Significant dates
- Added to NRHP: October 14, 1980
- Designated NHL: June 29, 1989
- Designated MSHS: October 21, 1975

The Fisher Building is a landmark office tower located at 3011 West Grand Boulevard in the heart of the New Center area of Detroit, Michigan. The ornate 30-story building, completed in 1928, is one of the major works of architect Albert Kahn, and is designed in an Art Deco style, faced with limestone, granite, and several types of marble. The Fisher family financed the building with proceeds from the sale of Fisher Body to General Motors. It was designed to house office and retail space.

The building, which contains the elaborate 2,089-seat Fisher Theatre, was designated a National Historic Landmark on June 29, 1989. It also houses the headquarters for the Detroit Public Schools and the studios of radio stations WJR, WDVD, and WUFL.

== History ==
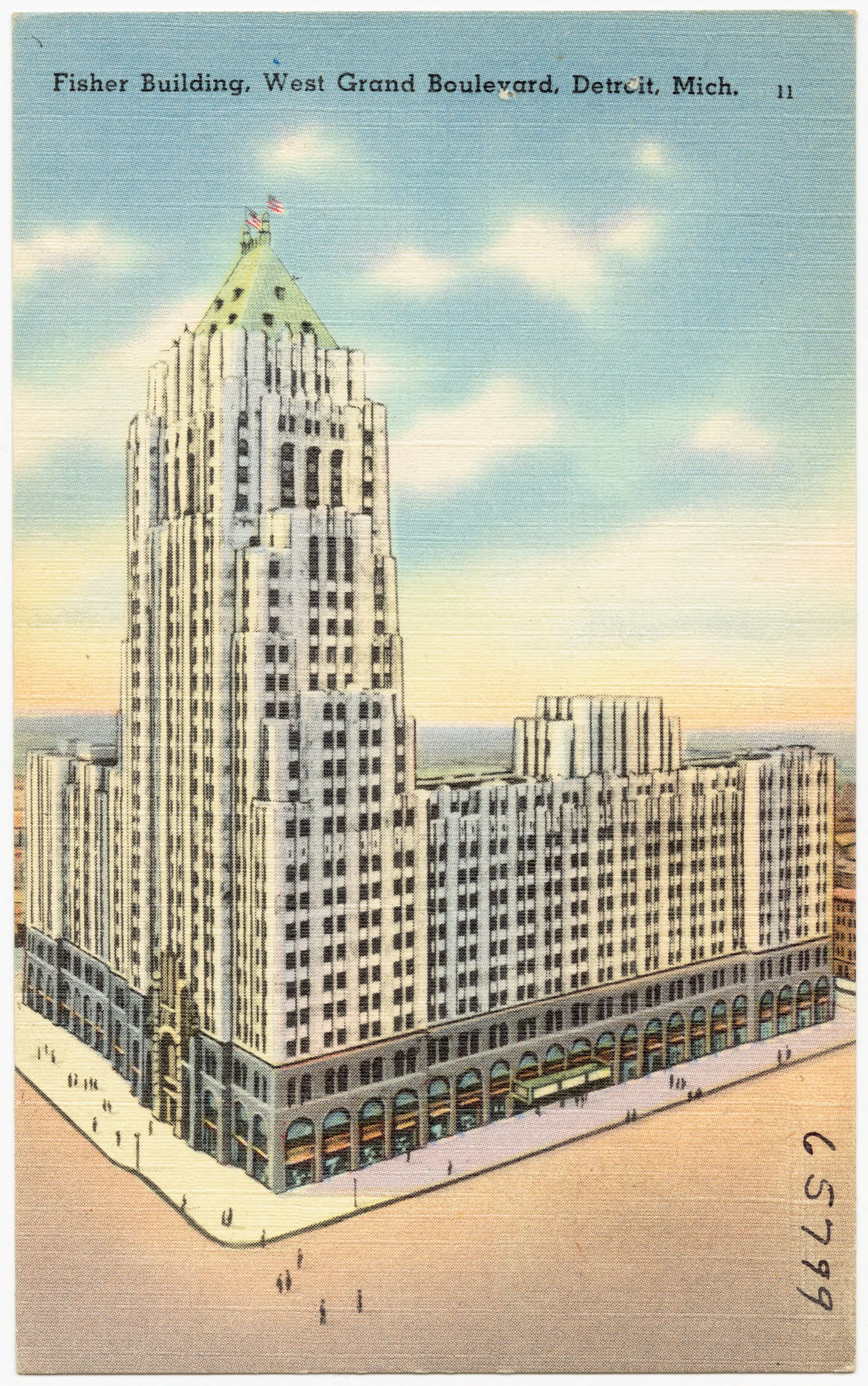
A 1930s postcard depicting the Fisher Building

Initially, architect Joseph Nathaniel French of Albert Kahn Associates planned for a complex of three buildings, with two 30-story structures flanking a 60-story tower. However, the Great Depression caused the project to be scaled back to a single tower.

The Fisher brothers located the building across from the General Motors Building (Cadillac Place), as General Motors had recently purchased the Fisher Body Company. The two massive buildings spurred the development of a New Center for the city, a business district north of its downtown area.

The building's hipped roof was originally covered with gold leaf tiles, but during World War II these tiles were covered in asphalt because it was feared that the reflective surface would attract enemy bombers. After the war, the asphalt could not be removed from the gold tiles without harming them, so they were replaced with green tiles. Since the 1980s, these tiles have been illuminated at night with colored lights to give them a gold appearance. On St. Patrick's Day, the lights are changed to green and, in recent years, to celebrate the NHL playoffs, the tower is illuminated with red lights in honor of the Detroit Red Wings.

In 1974, Tri-Star Development purchased the Fisher Building and adjoining New Center Building for approximately $20 million.

In 2001, FK Acquisition LLC, a real estate firm based in Southfield, purchased the two buildings from TrizecHahn Corporation for $31 million. FK Acquisition LLC lost the buildings to its lender in 2015.

In 2002, Detroit Public Schools (DPS) paid the owner of the Fisher Building $24.1 million to purchase five floors to house administrative offices, citing the high cost of renovations needed at the Maccabees Building, the previous headquarters, to comply with building and safety codes.

In July 2015, Southfield-based developer Redico LLC, in partnership with HFZ Capital Group of New York City and Peter Cummings of The Platform, a Detroit-based development company, taking advantage of the general decline in Detroit real estate values, purchased the Fisher Building and adjacent Albert Kahn Building, plus 2,000 parking spaces in two parking structures and three surface lots in New Center for only $12.2 million at auction. Redico said the partnership plans to transform the two buildings, which are connected by an underground pedestrian concourse, into what it called a "true urban" mixed-use development, with a mix of office, retail, residential and entertainment uses. The multi-year project has a potential cost of $70 million to $80 million in addition to the purchase price. The Redico interest was purchased by Cummings and his partner in The Platform, Dietrich Knoer, in 2016.

In 2023, Michigan State University acquired a 79% equity stake in the Fisher Building.

== Architecture ==
The Fisher Building rises 30 stories with a roof height of 428 feet (130 m), a top floor height of 339 feet (103 m), and the spire reaching 444 feet (135 m). The building has 21 elevators. Albert Kahn and Associates designed the building with Joseph Nathaniel French serving as chief architect. French took inspiration from Eliel Saarinen's Tribune Tower design of 1922, seen in the emphasis on verticality and the stepped-back upper stories. The building is unlike any other Albert Kahn production. It has been called "Detroit's largest art object".

In 1929, the Architectural League of New York honored the Fisher Building with a silver medal in architecture. The opulent three-story barrel vaulted lobby is constructed with forty different kinds of marble, decorated by Hungarian artist Géza Maróti, and is highly regarded by architects. The sculpture on the exterior of the building was supplied by several sculptors including Maróti, Corrado Parducci, Anthony De Lorenzo and Ulysses Ricci.

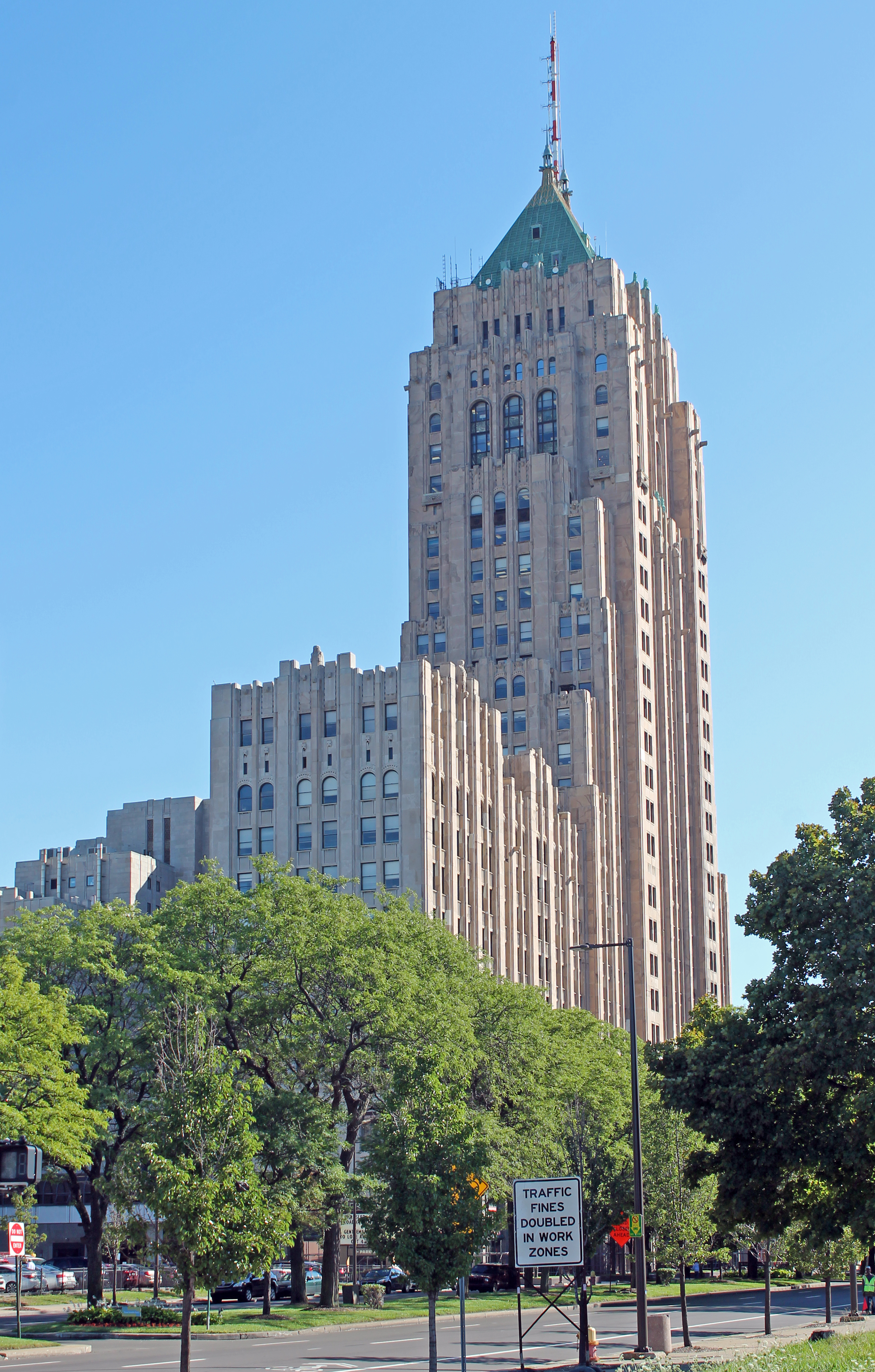
Looking east

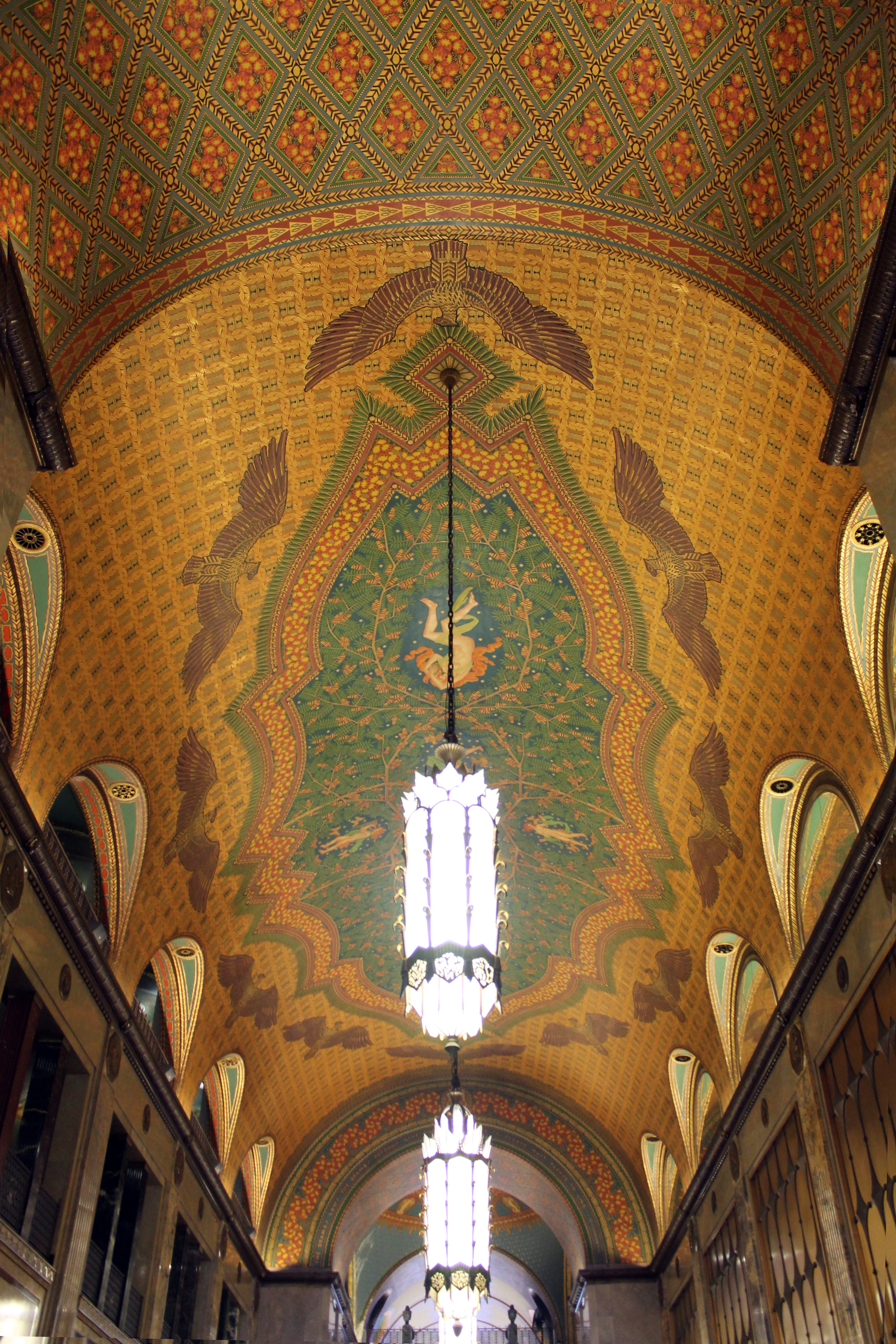
Arcade ceiling

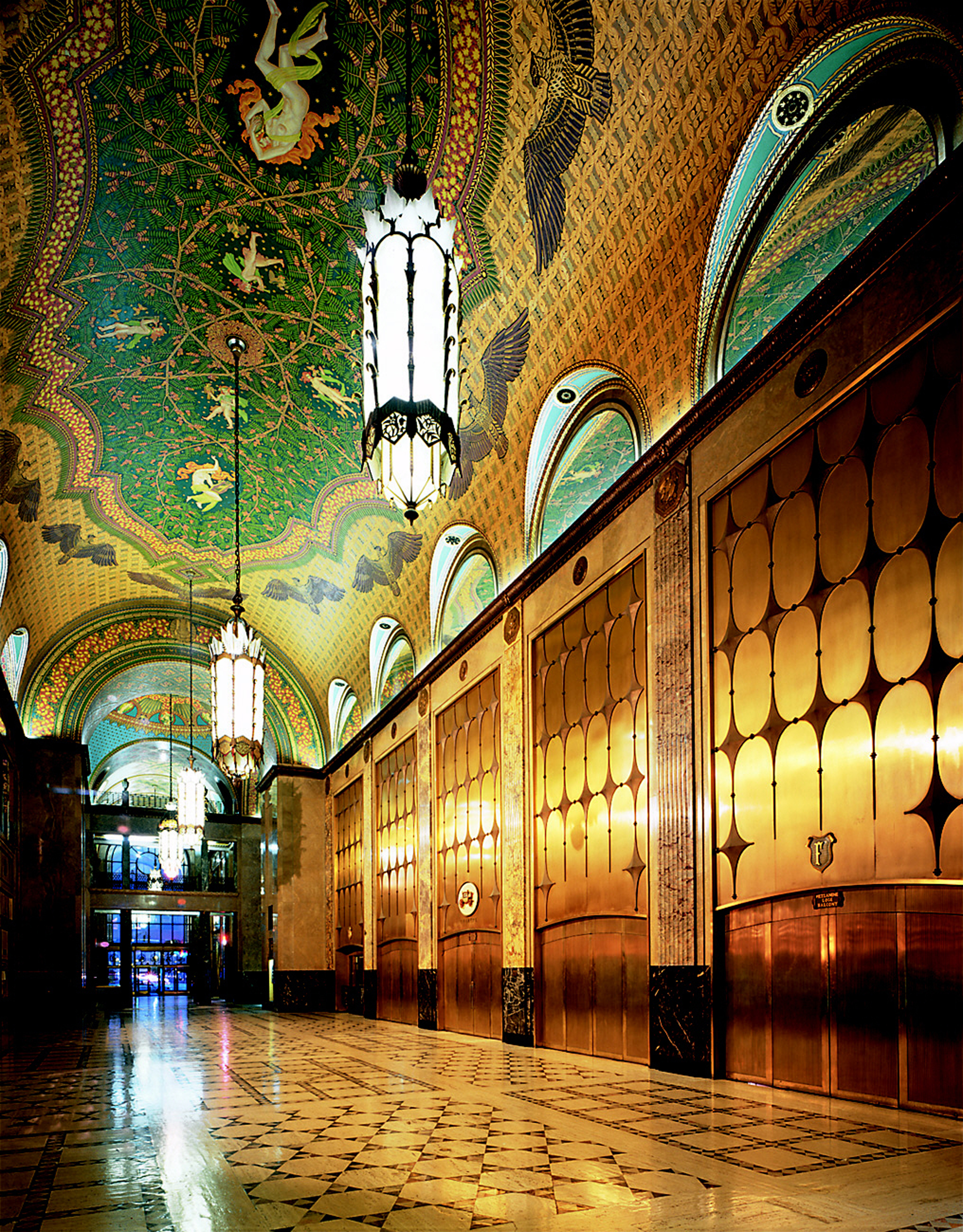
Arcade and theatre entrance

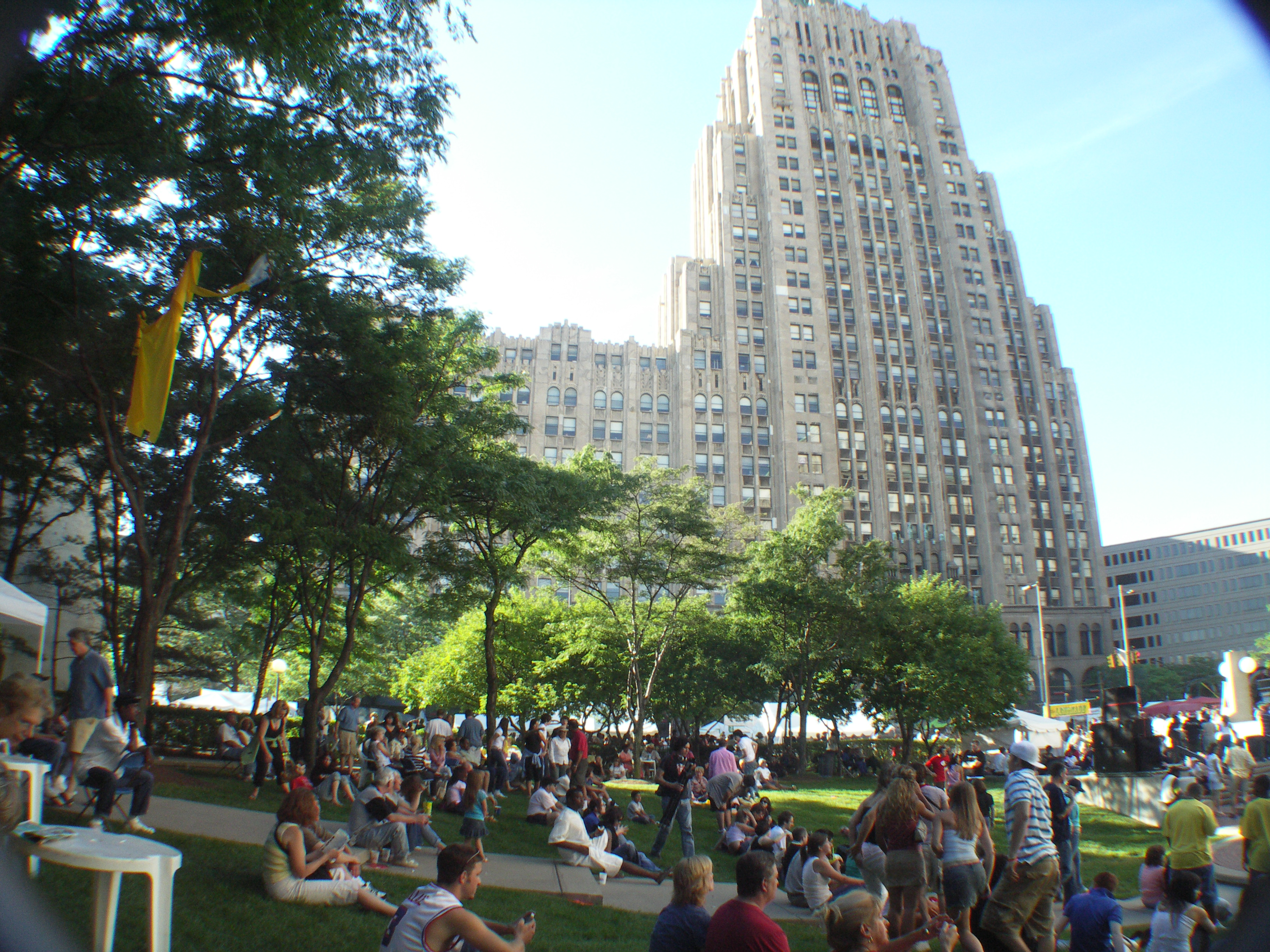
View from the south

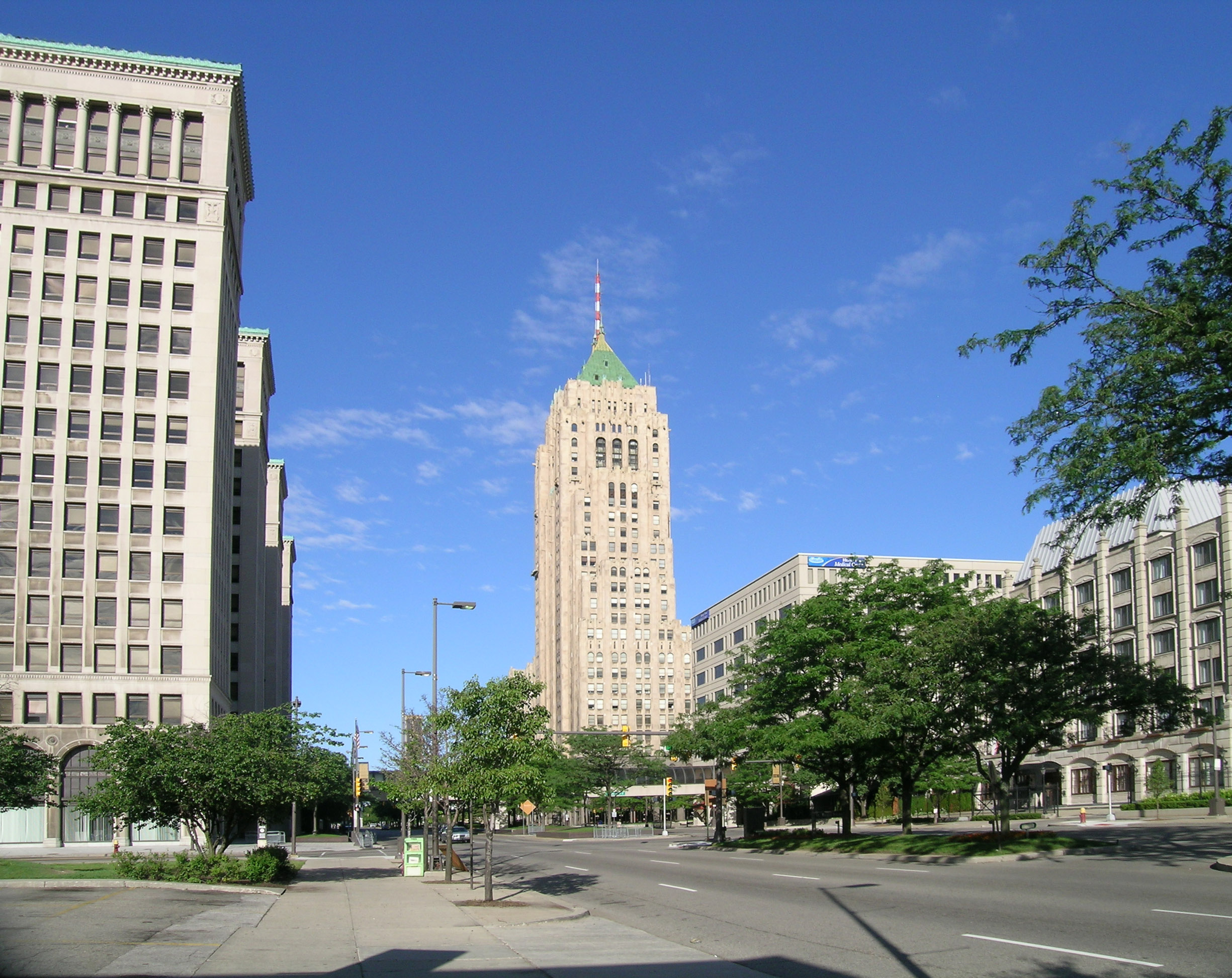
Looking west

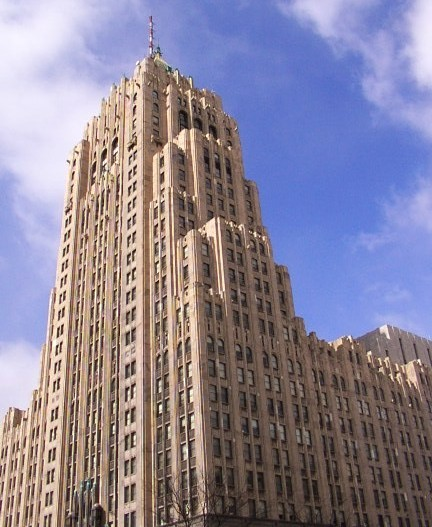

== Radio ==
Designs called for two flagpoles atop the gilt roof. While they were installed, they were essentially unusable as a radio antenna was installed when one of the building's oldest tenants, radio station WJR, leased space in December 1928. On-air hosts often mention that broadcasts originate "from the golden tower of the Fisher Building." This was a requirement of the station's original lease in exchange for a nominal rent. Two other radio stations, WDVD-FM (the former WJR-FM) and WUFL, also have broadcast studios in the building.

In 1970, building employees discovered a storage room sealed with tape. None of the staff knew what the room contained or why it was sealed. When they located the key, they found the flags of 75 nations that apparently were created in 1928 and intended to be flown for foreign visitors.

== Fisher Theatre ==
The building is also home to the Fisher Theatre, one of Detroit's oldest live theatre venues. The theatre, designed by the Chicago-based architectural firm of Anker S. Graven & Arthur G. Mayger, originally featured a lavish Aztec-themed interior in the Mayan Revival style, a Wurlitzer 4-manual/34-rank organ, and once had Mexican-Indian art, banana trees, and live macaws that its patrons could feed. After the Depression, the theatre operated primarily as a movie house until 1961. Originally containing 3,500 seats, the interior was renovated into a 2,089-seat playhouse that allowed for more spacious seating and lobbies for patrons at a cost of $3.5 million. The original decor was changed to a simple mid-century design, but remained on the organ, which was moved to the Senate Theater.

The Nederlander Organization opened the "new" Fisher Theatre on October 2, 1961 and operated it until April 2021 when it sold the venue to the Ambassador Theatre Group. It primarily features traveling productions of Broadway shows and has hosted numerous out-of-town tryouts.

Pre-Broadway Engagements at the Fisher:

- 1961: The Gay Life
- 1962: No Strings, Bravo Giovanni, Oliver!
- 1963: Sophie, Here's Love, Jennie, Hello, Dolly!
- 1964: Foxy, Fiddler on the Roof, Golden Boy, I Had a Ball
- 1965: Pleasures and Palaces, Pickwick, Skyscraper, Sweet Charity
- 1966: Pousse-Café, Walking Happy
- 1967: Illya Darling, Henry, Sweet Henry
- 1968: George M!, I'm Solomon, Lovers and Other Strangers, Maggie Flynn
- 1969: La Strada
- 1970: Applause, The Rothschilds, Not Now, Darling
- 1972: Tricks
- 1973: Seesaw, Lorelei, Turtlenecks, Gigi
- 1974: Good News, London Assurance, The Wiz
- 1979: Sugar Babies, Oklahoma!
- 1982: Seven Brides for Seven Brothers
- 1986: Into the Light
- 1996: Big

== Art ==
Befitting the Fisher Building's history in association with art, three nationally recognized fine-art galleries have occupied space in the structure including the Gertrude Kasle Gallery and London Fine Arts Group.

- Gertrude Kasle Gallery: Located in Suite 310 of the Fisher Building from 1965 to 1976 was a nationally recognized fine-art gallery hosting exhibits for some of the most highly respected artists of the second half of the 20th century including Willem de Kooning, Jim Dine, Helen Frankenthaler, Robert Goodnough, Adolph Gottlieb, Phillip Guston, Grace Hartigan, Ian Hornak, Ray Johnson, Robert Motherwell, Lowell Nesbitt, Claes Oldenburg, Robert Rauschenberg and Jack Tworkov.
- London Fine Arts Group: Located in a large portion of the third floor of the Fisher Building during the 1970s and 1980s, London Fine Arts Group acted as a publishing company assisting in producing limited edition art works for many internationally recognized artists including Yaacov Agam, Karel Appel, Arman, Romare Bearden, Gene Davis, Don Eddy, Alberto Giacometti, Ian Hornak, Lester Johnson, Alex Katz, Richard Lindner, Roberto Matta, Lowell Nesbitt, Robert Rauschenberg, Harry Bertoia, Donald Sultan, Victor Vasarely and Larry Zox.

== See also ==
- Cadillac Place
- Guardian Building
- Albert Kahn Building
- Pewabic Pottery
- List of tallest buildings in Detroit
- List of National Historic Landmarks in Michigan
- National Register of Historic Places listings in Downtown and Midtown Detroit
