= Senate Theater =

Theater in Detroit

- The Senate Theater in 1986
- Interactive map of Senate Theater
- Address: 6424 Michigan Avenue; Detroit, Michigan; United States
- Coordinates: 42°19′52.4″N 83°07′22.0″W
- Capacity: 784
- Public transit: DDOT 2, 30; SMART FAST Michigan 261

Construction
- Opened: 1926

The Senate Theater is a theater in Detroit, Michigan, known for its "Mighty Wurlitzer" pipe organ, originally installed at the Fisher Theater. The Senate opened in 1926, deteriorated substantially after its closure in the 1950s, and reopened in 1964 under the ownership and volunteer operation of the Detroit Theatre Organ Society. The Senate continues to present organ performances, classic films, and private events.

== Theater history ==
The Senate Theater was built in 1926 and designed by architect Christian Brandt. As a neighborhood theater, it mostly showed movies. A remodeling in the late 1940s added Art Deco themes, which were subsequently covered up.

The Senate operated as a cinema, with occasional live shows, until its closure in the mid-1950s.

The Senate was originally equipped with a 2-manual/7-rank Robert Morton pipe organ, which was later installed in the WXYZ studios. WXYZ donated the organ to the Our Lady of Fatima Church in Oak Park in 1955, which was destroyed in a fire the next year.

Following its closure, the city seized the Senate for non-payment of taxes, and the theater fell into disrepair. The roof developed leaks, and the basement filled with water. The Senate's condition was noted as "derelict" when it was purchased by the Detroit Theater Organ Club in 1962 at a price of $1,000 (equivalent to $10,600 in 2025). A full renovation followed, which allowed the installation of the massive Mighty Wurlitzer on the Senate's original stage.

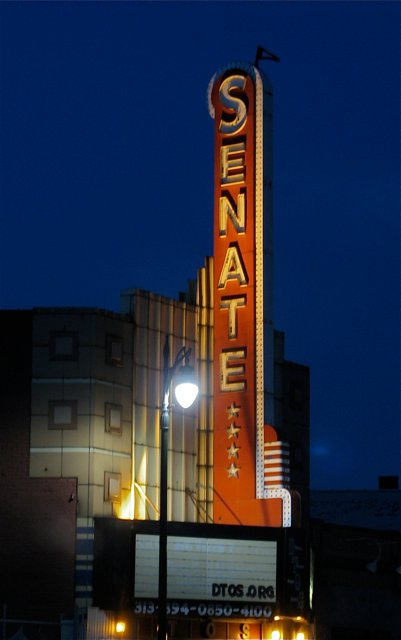
The marquee shown at night in 2016

A major project in 1988 redecorated the interior of the theater. In 1989, the Detroit Theater Organ Club reformed as the Detroit Theater Organ Society, still an all-volunteer organization.

In 2009, the Senate closed due to a lack of funds. Following a fundraising campaign, the theater reopened in May 2011 and began showing classic films in 2013 to raise additional revenue. George Orbits, founder of the DTOC and major financial backer, died in 2015. A GoFundMe fundraiser in 2016 raised over $12,000 towards renovating the marquee, parts of which had fallen into disrepair.

== Organ history ==
The Senate's "Mighty Wurlitzer" organ is the centerpiece of the theater. The organ, a Wurlitzer 4-manual/34-rank model, was built for the Fisher Theatre in Downtown Detroit in 1928, in its first incarnation as a movie palace. The organ is a custom model, designed for both silent film accompaniment and concerts. The Fisher organ features a wide variety of instruments, and included a Wurlitzer grand piano, which has stayed with the organ. The Mayan Revival theme of the original Fisher Theatre was applied to the organ console, a unique look for an organ console of its era.

The interior of the Fisher Theatre was entirely demolished in the early 1960s, making way for the construction of a "New Fisher" for live shows only. George Orbits of Inkster purchased the organ for $4,000 (equivalent to $43,000 in 2025), and intended to install it in his residence. On the suggestion of a fellow enthusiast, a plan was instead developed to install the organ in another theater. To accomplish this, the loose group of enthusiasts led by Orbits was organized as the Detroit Theater Organ Club.

Relocating the 30-ton instrument to a warehouse took 1,100 hours of labor, and some components of the organ narrowly escaped destruction by the demolition crews. The first meeting of the Detroit Theatre Organ Club was held in April 1961, and the organ was installed in the Iris Theatre on Grand Boulevard shortly afterwards. The Iris was a much smaller theater than the Fisher, and the installation of the Fisher organ proved troubling. The organ was so powerful that it destroyed plaster in the building, and the venue was undersized for the club's growing membership.

The organ was moved to the Senate, and the first performance at the Senate was given in 1964. The Mighty Wurlitzer was far too large for the original organ chambers, and the DTOC decided to install four of its six chambers on the Senate's stage. A new stage was built on top of the former orchestra pit to accommodate the grand piano and the organ console. This unique installation allows regular tours of four of the six chambers of the organ.

The organ continues to be played regularly. The Mighty Wurlitzer is the eighth-largest instrument built by the company, and is recognized nationally for its tone and power. In Michigan, its peers include the 4-manual/36-rank Mighty Wurlitzer at the Fox.

== Programming ==
The Senate shows a program of classic films, mostly from the early 20th century. Organ concerts and facility rentals are also key parts of the Senate's programming, and the Mighty Wurlitzer remains available for members to play outside of scheduled events.

== See also ==
- Redford Theatre
