= Redford Theatre =

Movie theater in Detroit, Michigan, United States

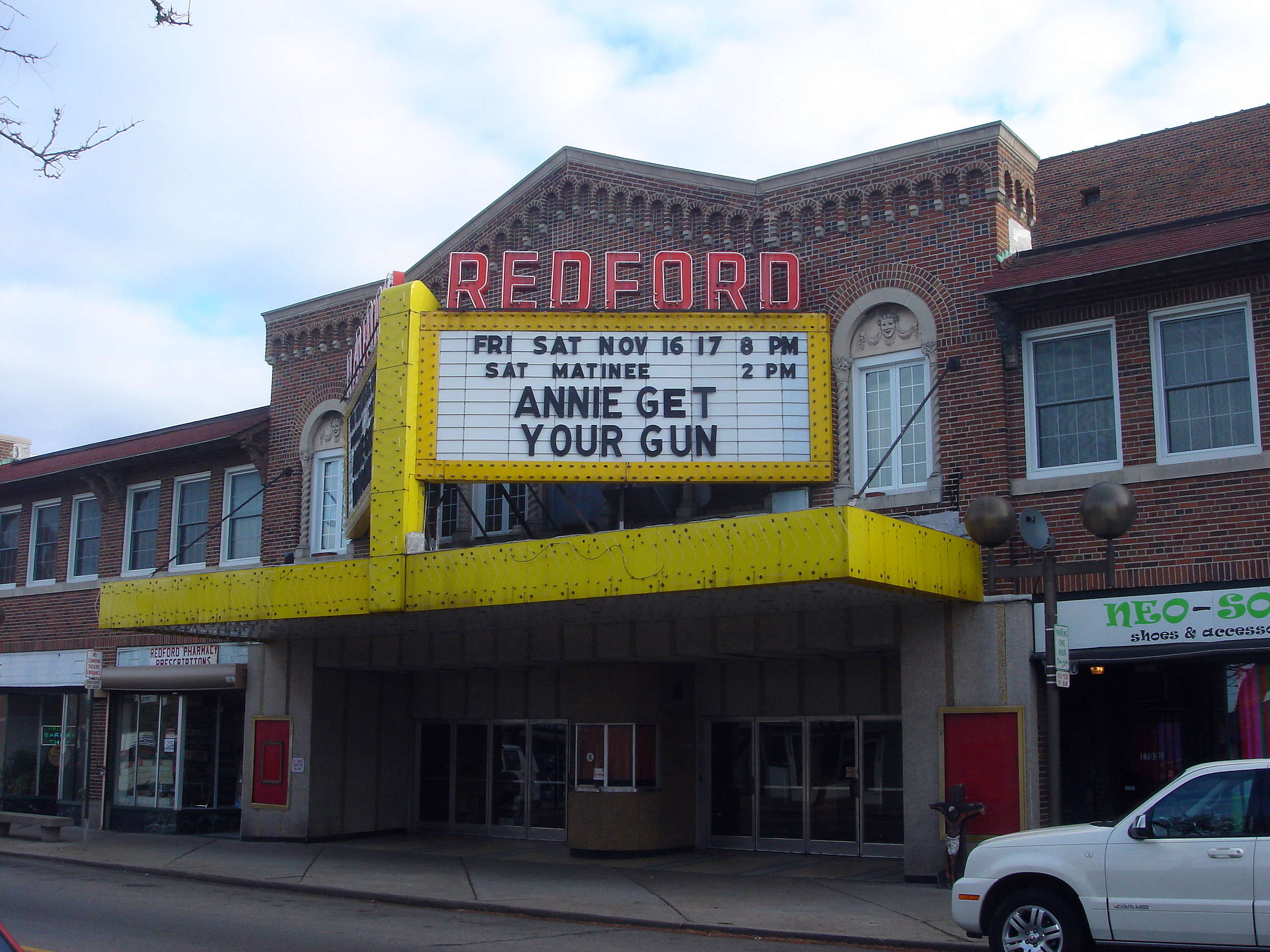
- Redford Theatre Marquee
- Interactive map of Redford Theatre
- Location: 17360 Lahser Road; Detroit, MI
- Owner: Motor City Theatre Organ Society
- Capacity: 1610
- Type: Atmospheric theatre
- Public transit: DDOT 3, 7, 32; SMART 280, 305, 375

Construction
- Built: 1927
- Opened: January 27, 1928

Website
- redfordtheatre.com
- Redford Theatre Building
- U.S. National Register of Historic Places
- Michigan State Historic Site
- Location within Michigan Location within the United States
- Coordinates: 42°25′2″N 83°15′27″W
- Area: 2 acres (0.8 ha)
- Built: 1927
- Architect: Wilhelm & Mobly Verner; R.F. Shreve
- Architectural style: Asian interior
- NRHP reference No.: 85000171

Significant dates
- Added to NRHP: January 31, 1985
- Designated MSHS: August 18, 1988

The Redford Theatre is an atmospheric theatre in the Old Redford neighborhood of Detroit. The theatre opened in January 1928, advertised as "Detroit's most unique suburban theatre," due to its grand design, featuring Japanese and Chinese motifs.

The Redford is part of a series of three grand cinemas in the Detroit suburbs operated by the Kunsky circuit, all of which stand today. The Redford features its original 3-manual/10-rank Barton organ, which is played regularly.

The Redford's ownership passed to the Goldberg family and their Community Theatre chain in the 1930s. The Motor City Theatre Organ Society purchased the theatre in 1977, and continues to operate and renovate the space, presenting organ shows and classic movies. The theatre was listed on the National Register of Historic Places in 1985.

== History ==
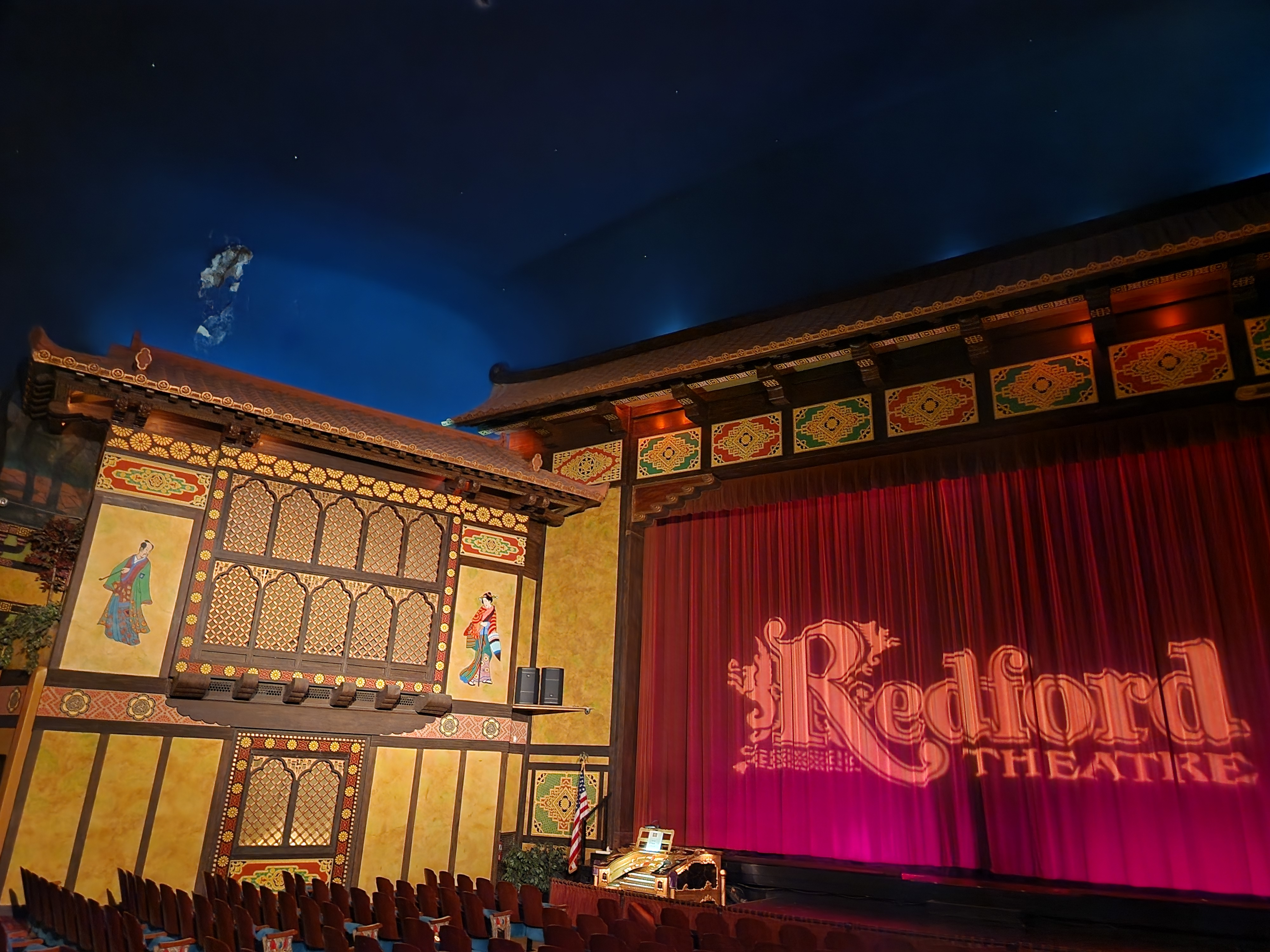
Interior of the auditorium, showing the starry sky and the Japanese theme

The Redford was built during a short-lived period of rapid expansion of the City of Detroit, its namesake neighborhood having been annexed into the city in 1926 from Redford Township. The annexation was accompanied by promises of further development and increased access to city services, and the construction of the Redford Theatre became a key part of that development. The theatre's construction was financed by bonds sold by Backus, Fordson, and Company in the amount of $225,000, equivalent to $3,260,000 in 2024.

The opening of the theatre was the culmination of a weeklong festival, sponsored by local businesses. At its opening, the Redford was advertised as "Detroit's most unique suburban theatre," likening the experience of seeing a show there to "sitting in a Japanese garden." The theatre's interior also featured standard components of an atmospheric theatre, including a blue plaster ceiling evoking clouds and twinkling stars.

The interior theme of the theatre extended to its 3-manual/10-rank Barton theatre organ, which was installed with Japanese and Chinese-themed instruments.

During World War II, many of the original Japanese-style decorations, including the lobby chandeliers, were covered up or removed as part of a broader trend of anti-Japanese sentiment. Organ performances ended around the same time, although the organ remained intact. The original marquee was scrapped for the war effort.

In 1966, the Motor City Theatre Organ Society, a local chapter of the American Theatre Organ Society, began a series of organ performances at the theatre. The MTCOS had begun to restore the organ the year prior, and initially performed their organ shows after the last film showing of the evening. The organ shows were successful, showing a continued desire for programming at the Redford.

The MCTOS arranged to buy the theatre in 1977, and owned it outright by 1985, the same year as it was listed on the National Register of Historic Places. Work began that year to restore the Redford to its original 1928 appearance. The theatre currently seats 1610, lower than the original capacity of over 2000.

The Redford continues to be operated by the all-volunteer staff of the MTCOS, and is committed to keeping prices for admission and concessions low. The theatre derives its revenue from admission, concession sales, and the rental of the venue for private events, including weddings.

== Organ ==
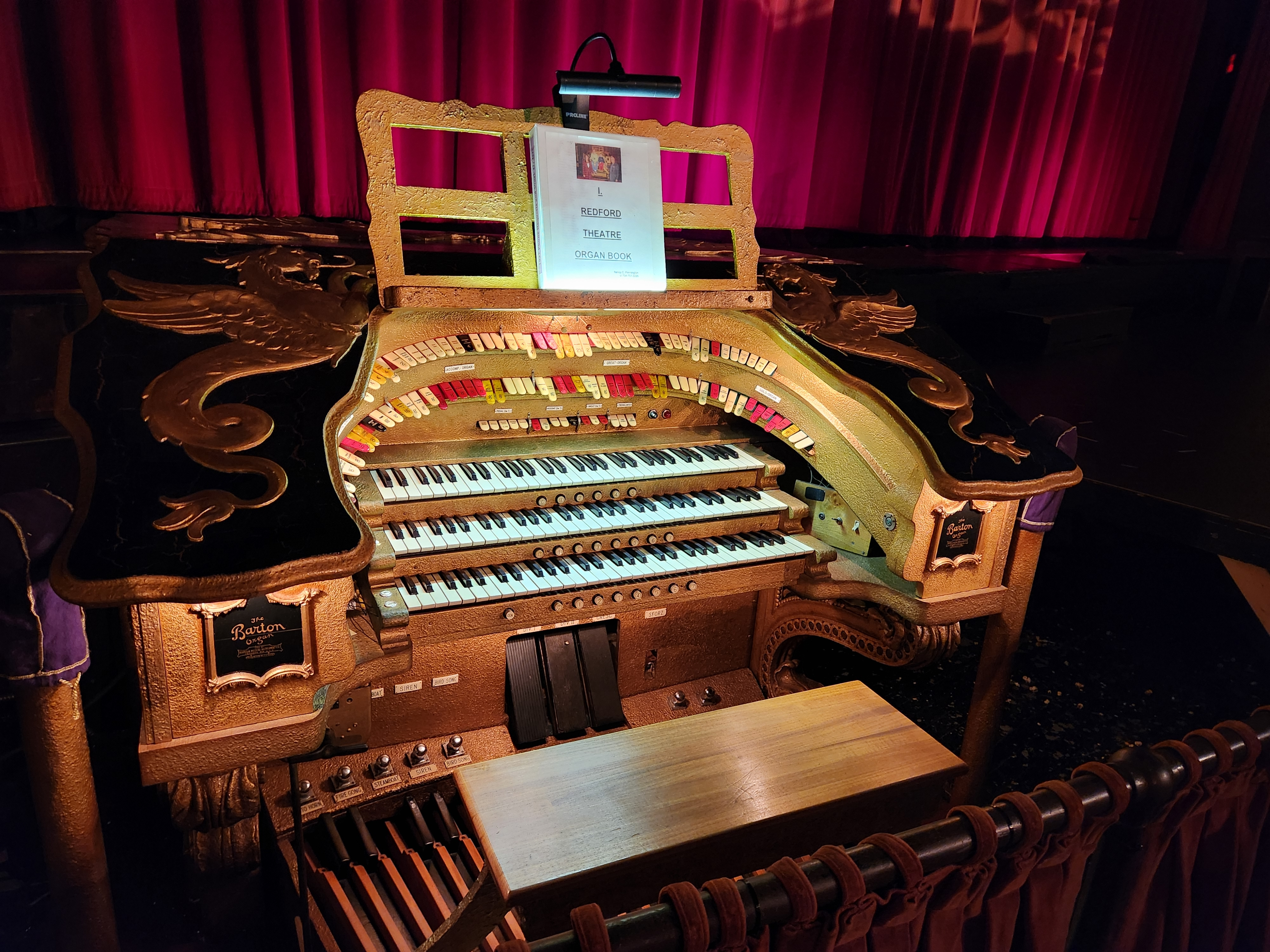
The organ console, with the lift in the lowered position

The Redford Theatre features a 3-manual/10-rank theatre organ, built by the Bartola Musical Instrument Company. The "Golden-Voiced Barton" has been altered only slightly from its original state, with the addition of a piano and modifications to the tuba. The organ is played regularly at public events, including overtures before classic films, accompaniment for silent films, and full-length organ concerts.

The Redford's organ is one of two theatre organs in Detroit that remain in their original venue, and one of fewer than forty Bartons in their original installations. A contemporaneous original-installation Barton organ is located nearby at the Michigan Theater in Ann Arbor. The Redford's sibling theatres, the Kunsky-Birmingham (now an Emagine multiplex) and the Kunsky-Royal Oak (now the Royal Oak Music Theatre), featured similar Barton organs, but neither remain in their original venues. It has been digitally sampled and available for free for softwares like GrandOrgue and Hauptwerk.

== Programming ==
Because of its location on the outskirts of Detroit, the spacious Redford often has not been a first-run movie theatre. However, like many current second-run theatres, it has shown films that were market-tested at other movie houses. For example, on May 16, 1956, the Redford presented two prominent 1955 films - The Rose Tattoo and The Trouble with Harry.

When most of the movie theaters in the Detroit area were in the city of Detroit, the Redford Theatre screened many films that were first shown at one of the large theaters in the Grand Circus Park area of downtown Detroit. Cimarron opened at the Redford on April 19, 1931, after its Detroit premiere at the Fox Theatre on February 5, 1931. In 1956, The Searchers opened at the Palms on May 18 and arrived at the Redford on August 15.

In the early 1930s, the Redford often showed three movies in one week (usually starting on Sundays, Wednesdays and Fridays). During one week in 1931, patrons enjoyed Joan Crawford and Clark Gable in Laughing Sinners (July 12–14), Lew Ayres in Iron Man (July 15–16) and Spencer Tracy in Six Cylinder Love (July 17–18). Accompanying Redford films of the 1930s were comedy shorts (Laurel and Hardy, Charley Chase and Our Gang), cartoons (Mickey Mouse, Bugs Bunny and Mighty Mouse), golf instructional films with Bobby Jones and vaudeville acts.

In the 1950s, the Redford often showed double features, along with "Kiddie Matinees" on Saturday afternoons that included cartoons and special movies. Occasionally, the Redford hosted Detroit area premieres, such as the December 25, 1956 opening of Friendly Persuasion, which was crowded out of the larger theaters by blockbusters like The Ten Commandments.

When movies started opening outside of downtown Detroit in the 1960s, the Redford was a first run theater for many prominent movies, including One Hundred and One Dalmatians (1961), Hud (1963), Von Ryan's Express (1965), You Only Live Twice (1967), Cool Hand Luke (1967), and The Graduate (1967).

In the 1970s, when socioeconomic forces closed many Detroit theaters and opened many others in the Detroit suburbs, the Redford went into decline and later was reborn with a still-running series of classic Hollywood movies. The Redford is one of the few remaining theaters mentioned in a September 11, 1981 Detroit News article about film repertory houses in the Detroit area.

Current film programming at the Redford Theatre consists of a bi-weekly movie series that ranges from silent films through the musicals of the 40s, 50s and 60s to some films from the 2000s. Spring and Fall festivals featuring films of the Three Stooges have grown in popularity. In addition to the classic film series and organ concerts produced by MCTOS, the theatre is available for rental by community groups wishing to produce their own shows.

== See also ==
- Senate Theater
