= Gertrude Kasle Gallery =

Contemporary art gallery in Detroit (1965–76)

Coordinates: 42°22′9.5″N 83°4′37″W

- Industry: Art gallery
- Founded: 1965
- Founder: Gertrude Kasle
- Defunct: 1976
- Headquarters: United States

The Gertrude Kasle Gallery was a contemporary art gallery located in Detroit, Michigan. The gallery operated between 1965 and 1976, displaying American contemporary art.

== History ==
The founder of the Gertrude Kasle Gallery, Gertrude Kasle, was born in New York City on December 2, 1917, and began her lifelong career in the art world very early, taking art classes in high school and Saturday classes at the Art Students League. She began her formal studies in art education at New York University (NYU) and later transferred to the University of Michigan. Kasle interrupted her studies during World War II to devote herself to family work while her husband served as a military chaplain. The family returned to Detroit in 1947 and she began classes at the Society of Arts and Crafts. After raising her three children, she enrolled in Wayne State University in 1955, completing her degree in 1962.

As a student in Detroit, Kasle was active in the Friends of Modern Art group at the Detroit Institute of Art, and became Vice President. In 1962, she was approached by Detroit businessman Franklin Siden to help him open a gallery where she would have a one-third partnership. During the first year of Siden Gallery's operations, Kasle introduced Detroit to the work of many notable contemporary American artists, such as Larry Rivers, Grace Hartigan, Robert Goodnough, and Robert Natkin.

Her tenure with the Siden Gallery was short-lived and by 1964 she left and began to contemplate her next move. Several of the artists she had represented at Siden Gallery encouraged her to open her own gallery. Local art critic Joy Hakanson Colby who worked for the Detroit News interviewed Kasle and claimed that Kasle was "looking for gallery space". Responding to the article, the Fisher Building offered Kasle a very attractive lease in the "New Center" area of downtown Detroit that would later become known as the city's gallery center, housing several prominent galleries.

With the help of her husband and son, she opened the doors of the Gertrude Kasle Gallery on April 10, 1965. The opening exhibition featured Larry Rivers, Grace Hartigan, Robert Goodnough, Irving Kreisberg, and Manoucher Yektai. Kasle's goal was to introduce the city of Detroit to the foremost contemporary artists in the country, some already well-established such as Willem de Kooning, Helen Frankenthaler, Philip Guston, Grace Hartigan, Robert Motherwell, Lowell Nesbitt, Claes Oldenburg, Charles Pollock, Larry Rivers, and Jack Tworkov, as well as others just becoming known, such as Jim Dine and Ian Hornak. Through group and one-man shows, the Gertrude Kasle Gallery represented contemporary painting, mixed media, and sculpture, focusing primarily on the Abstract Expressionist movement. The gallery also fostered many local Detroit artists, giving them their first shows, including Al Loving and Brenda Goodman.

During her earlier tenure with the Siden Gallery Kasle had worked with Tatyana Grosman of Universal Limited Art Editions which produced original prints of contemporary artists including Jasper Johns, Robert Rauschenberg, and Jim Dine. In her own gallery, Kasle continued her business relationship with Grosman and fine art print publishers, allowing the gallery access to many artists that were previously unattainable.

For eleven years the Gertrude Kasle Gallery operated as a thriving contemporary art gallery, forming the nucleus for the growing Detroit modern and avant garde art scene during the sixties and seventies. Although financially the gallery was not as successful as hoped, it provided a cultural forum for artists and Detroit art enthusiasts to convene, learn, and celebrate. In April, 1976 the gallery closed. When asked why she was closing the gallery, Gertrude Kasle said, "Because the need for a gallery like mine isn't as great as it was in the 1960s. Today the public respects and understands more about creative innovation in contemporary art." (Hakanson Colby, March, 1976) Although the gallery formally closed, Kasle continues to work as an art consultant and live in Detroit.

== See also ==
- Fisher Building, former location of the gallery
