= Ford House =

Ford House or Ford Farm or variations may refer to:

== United Kingdom ==
- Forde House, (anciently "Ford"), Wolborough, Newton Abbot, Devon

== United States ==
- Henry and Cornelia Ford Farm, Lexa, AR, listed on the NRHP in Arkansas
- Zachariah Ford House, Pleasant Grove, AR, listed on the NRHP in Arkansas
- Barney L. Ford Building, Denver, CO, listed on the NRHP in Colorado
- Justina Ford House, Denver, CO, listed on the NRHP in Colorado
- Fair Lane, the Henry Ford Estate in Dearborn, Michigan
- Edison and Ford Winter Estates, the Henry Ford Winter Estate in Fort Myers, Florida, listed on the NRHP in Florida
- Joseph Ford House, Cave Spring, GA, listed on the NRHP in Georgia
- W.T. Ford House, Earlham, IA, listed on the NRHP in Iowa
- Arthur Hillyer Ford House, Iowa City, IA, listed on the NRHP in Iowa
- Ford Stone House, Elliston, Kentucky, listed on the NRHP in Kentucky
- William Ford House, Brownsville, KY, listed on the NRHP in Kentucky
- Ford House (Owenton, Kentucky), listed on the NRHP in Kentucky
- John Jackson Ford House, Smiths Grove, KY, listed on the NRHP in Kentucky
- James Ford House, part of the Woods End Road Historic District in Lincoln, MA, listed on the NRHP in Massachusetts
- Henry Ford Square House, Garden City, MI, listed on the NRHP in Michigan
- President Gerald R. Ford Jr. Boyhood Home, Grand Rapids, MI, listed on the NRHP in Michigan
- Hebard–Ford Summer House, L'Anse, MI, listed on the NRHP in Michigan
- Edsel and Eleanor Ford House, 1100 Lakeshore Rd, Grosse Pointe Shores, MI, listed on the NRHP in Michigan
- Ford–Bacon House, Wyandotte, MI, listed on the NRHP in Michigan
- Ford–Williams House, Energy, MS, listed on the NRHP in Mississippi
- Mayor Ebb Ford House, Pascagoula, MS, listed on the NRHP in Mississippi
- Ford House (Sandy Hook, Mississippi), listed on the NRHP in Mississippi
- Lee M. Ford House, Great Falls, MT, listed on the NRHP in Montana
- Ford–Faesch House, Rockaway Township, NJ, listed on the NRHP in New Jersey
- Samuel Ford Jr.'s Hammock Farm, Florham Park, NJ, listed on the NRHP in New Jersey
- Lebbeus Ford House, Berkshire, NY, listed on the NRHP in New York
- Jacob Ford House, Morristown, NY, listed on the NRHP in New York
- Charles Ford House, Orleans, NY, listed on the NRHP in New York
- James Ford House, Lawrenceville, PA, listed on the NRHP in Pennsylvania
- President Gerald R. Ford Jr. House, Alexandria, VA, listed on the NRHP in Virginia
- Ford–Rigby House, Centerville, UT, listed on the NRHP in Utah
- Joseph N. and Algie Ford House, Centerville, UT, listed on the NRHP in Utah
- Ford House (Morgantown, West Virginia), listed on the NRHP in West Virginia

== See also ==
- Henry Ford House (disambiguation)
