= Meadow Brook Farms =

Meadow Brook Farms may refer to

- The Edsel and Eleanor Ford House, Grosse Point Shores, Michigan
- The farming estate of Meadow Brook Hall, Rochester, Michigan
