= Clara Bryant Ford =

Wife of Henry Ford (1866–1950)

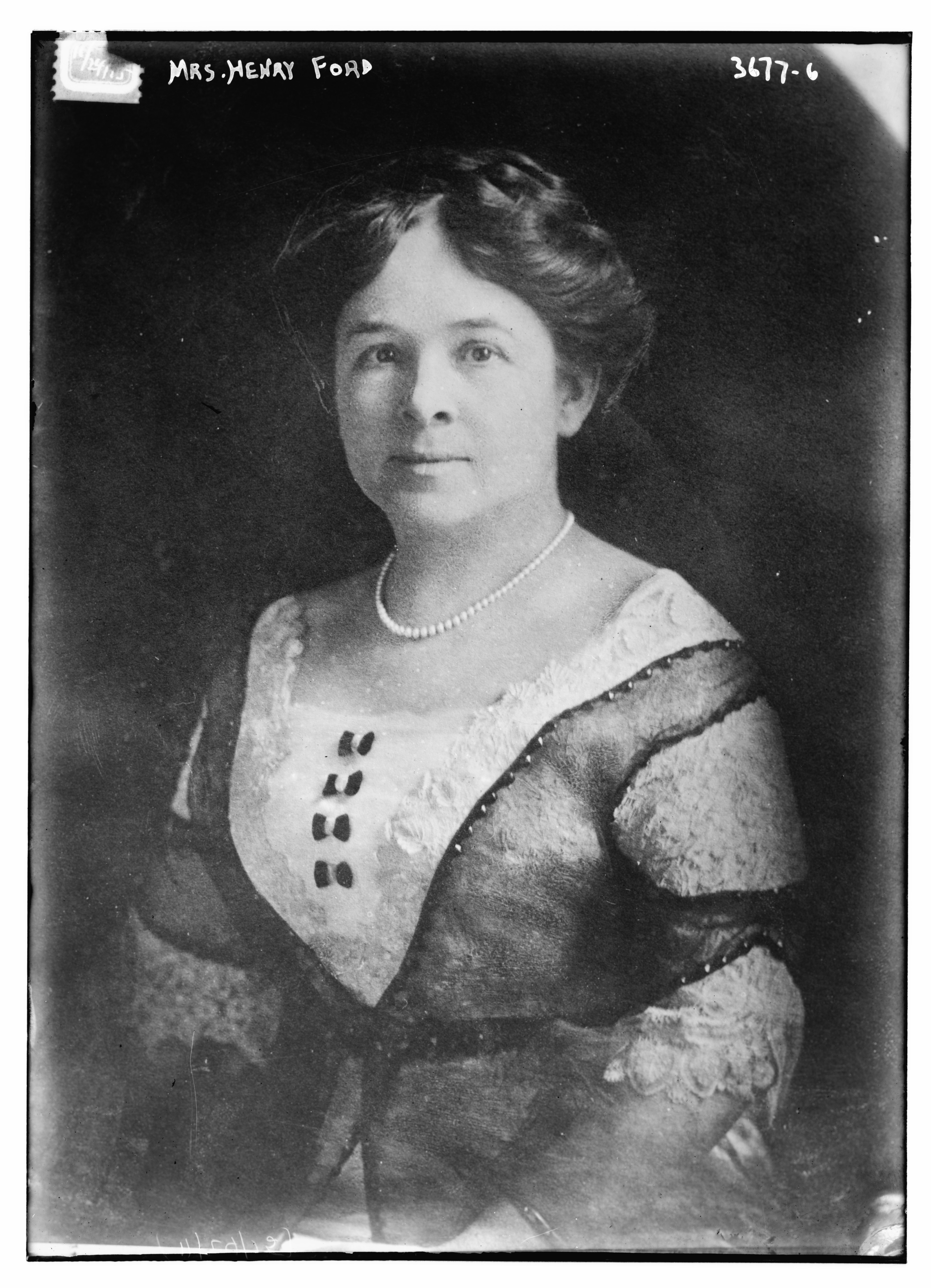
- Born: Clara Jane Bryant; April 11, 1866; Wayne County, Michigan, U.S.
- Died: September 29, 1950 (aged 84); Detroit, Michigan, U.S.
- Burial place: Ford Family Cemetery; 42.35791, -83.20112
- Spouse: Henry Ford (m. 1888; died 1947)
- Children: Edsel Bryant Ford

Clara Jane Bryant Ford (née Bryant; April 11, 1866 – September 29, 1950) was a suffragist, philanthropist, and the wife of Henry Ford. She was inducted into the Michigan Women's Hall of Fame in 2017.

== Personal life ==
=== Early life ===
Clara Jane Bryant was born on April 11, 1866, to Melvin S. Bryant, a farmer, and Martha Bench in Wayne County, Michigan, at the intersection of Grand River Road and Greenfield Road. The third of ten children, she was baptized on April 19 at St. John's Episcopal Church in Detroit. In 1870, her family moved about half a mile north to another farm in Wayne County. She attended Greenfield Township District No. 3 School. Clara completed her schooling in 1883.

As the eldest daughter in a Victorian farming family, Clara learned housekeeping and homemaking skills at an early age, including cooking, cleaning, and assuming the responsibilities of her younger siblings. In her personal time, she attended social events common for rural farming communities, such as dances at inns and taverns. It was at the 1885 New Year's dance at Martindale House, a local inn, that she would meet Henry Ford and begin their courtship. They would become engaged on April 19, 1886.

=== Marriage and family life ===
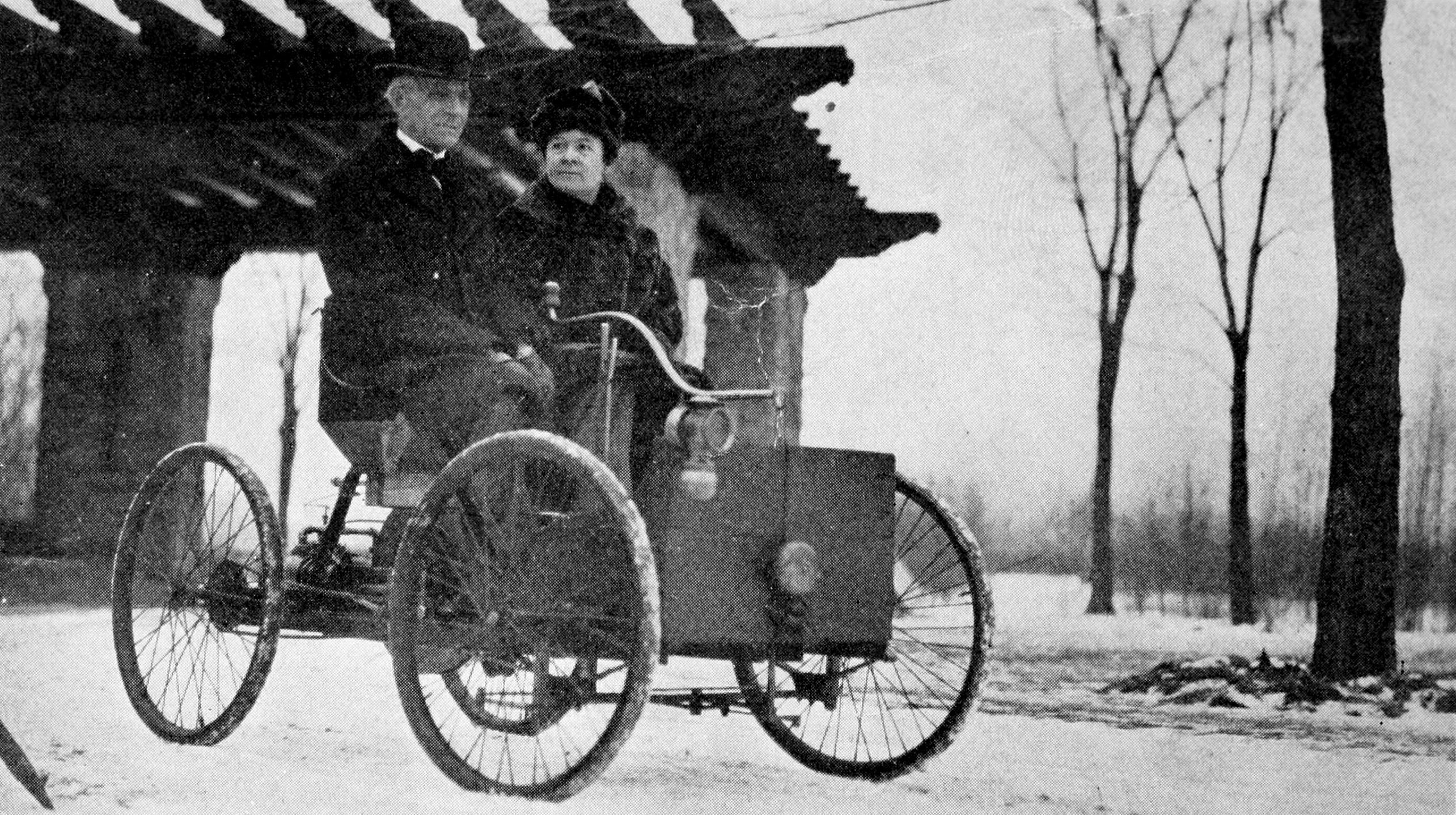
Henry and Clara Ford riding in the Quadricycle at Fair Lane

Clara married Henry Ford on April 11, 1888 (her 22nd birthday), at her parents' home. During their early marriage, Henry Ford utilized lumber he cut and processed himself from family farmland to construct their first home, known as the Square House (or Honeymoon House), a one-and-a-half-story home designed by Clara. They moved into this home in 1889. This would be the second of a total of fifteen homes the couple would live in during their marriage. The couple moved to Detroit in September 1891 for Henry Ford's job at the Edison Illuminating Company. During their time in Detroit, the couple lived in eight different rental properties as Henry Ford experimented with his gasoline engine, Quadricycle, and attempted to launch a successful automobile company, earning Clara the title of "The Believer," from her husband for her patience and flexibility. She was with Henry Ford upon his first test of a gasoline engine on December 24, 1891. It was in one of these rental properties that Clara Ford gave birth to their first and only child, Edsel Ford (1893-1943). Five weeks after the birth of Edsel, the pair would move to 58 Bagley Avenue, where Henry Ford completed the successful assembly of his first vehicle, the Quadricycle.

It wasn't until the success of Ford Motor Company and popularity of the Model T that the pair would own their own home on 66 Edison Avenue in the Boston-Edison Neighborhood of Detroit, built 1907-1908. Clara, continuing in her responsibility as homemaker, created an extensive library, oversaw the furnishing of this home, managed staff, and supervised the design and construction of the gardens, grounds, and greenhouse on the site. This home was beloved by the Fords, particularly Clara; however, the announcement and subsequent publicity of Ford Motor Company's "Five Dollar Day" forced them to move in 1914.

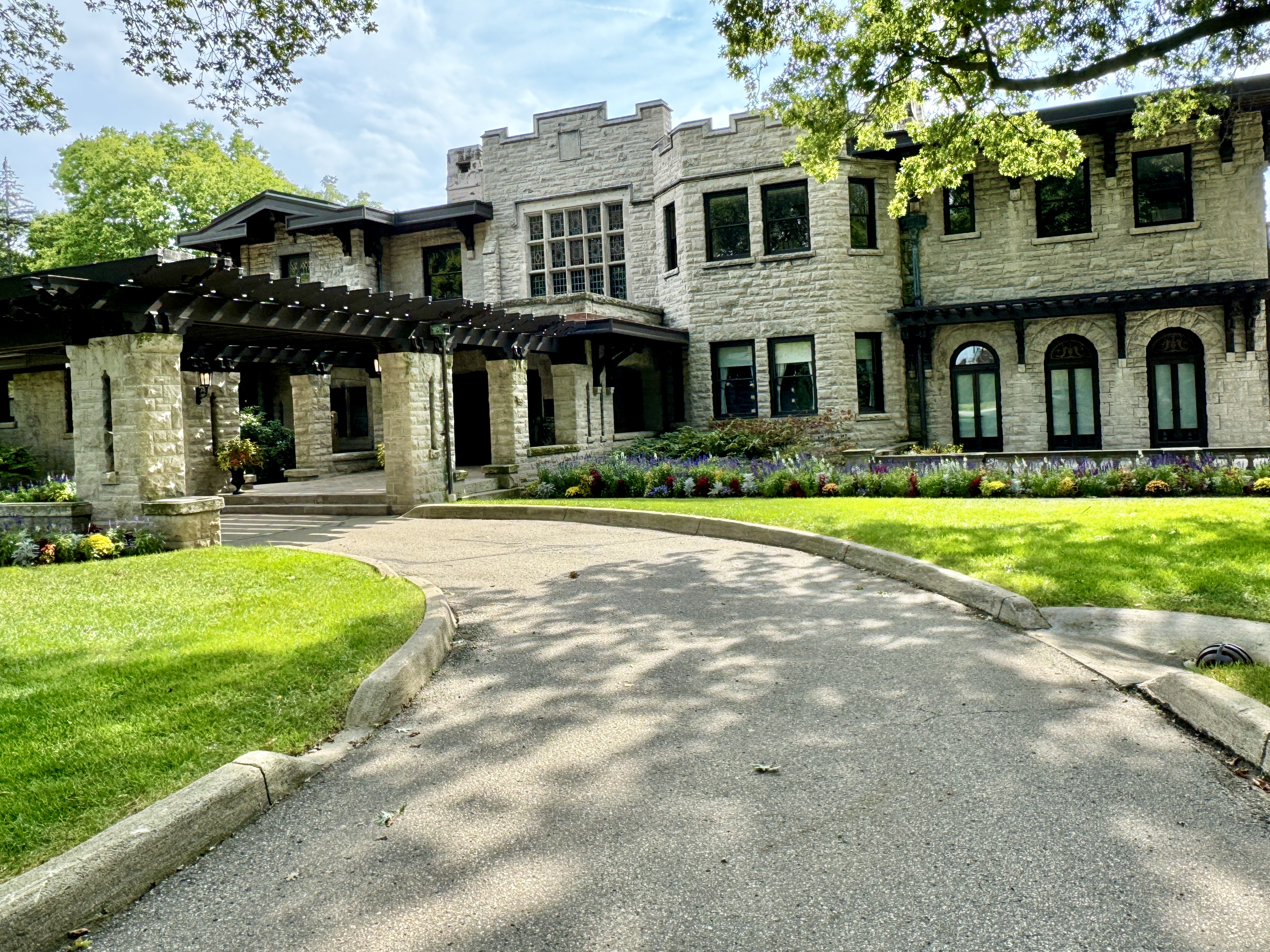
Fair Lane circle driveway entrance

=== Fair Lane ===
Fair Lane was the estate of Henry and Clara Ford, in Dearborn.

Between 1908 and 1910, the Fords purchased more than 1,000 acres of farmland in the Dearborn area. On this land, the pair built a bungalow in which they could stay when visiting the farmland, relatives in Dearborn, and get a retreat from the hustle and bustle of the city. The Fords initially purchased a large portion of land, known as Gaukler Pointe, along Lake St. Clair with the intent of building their private estate, but it was Clara who encouraged the move back to Dearborn.

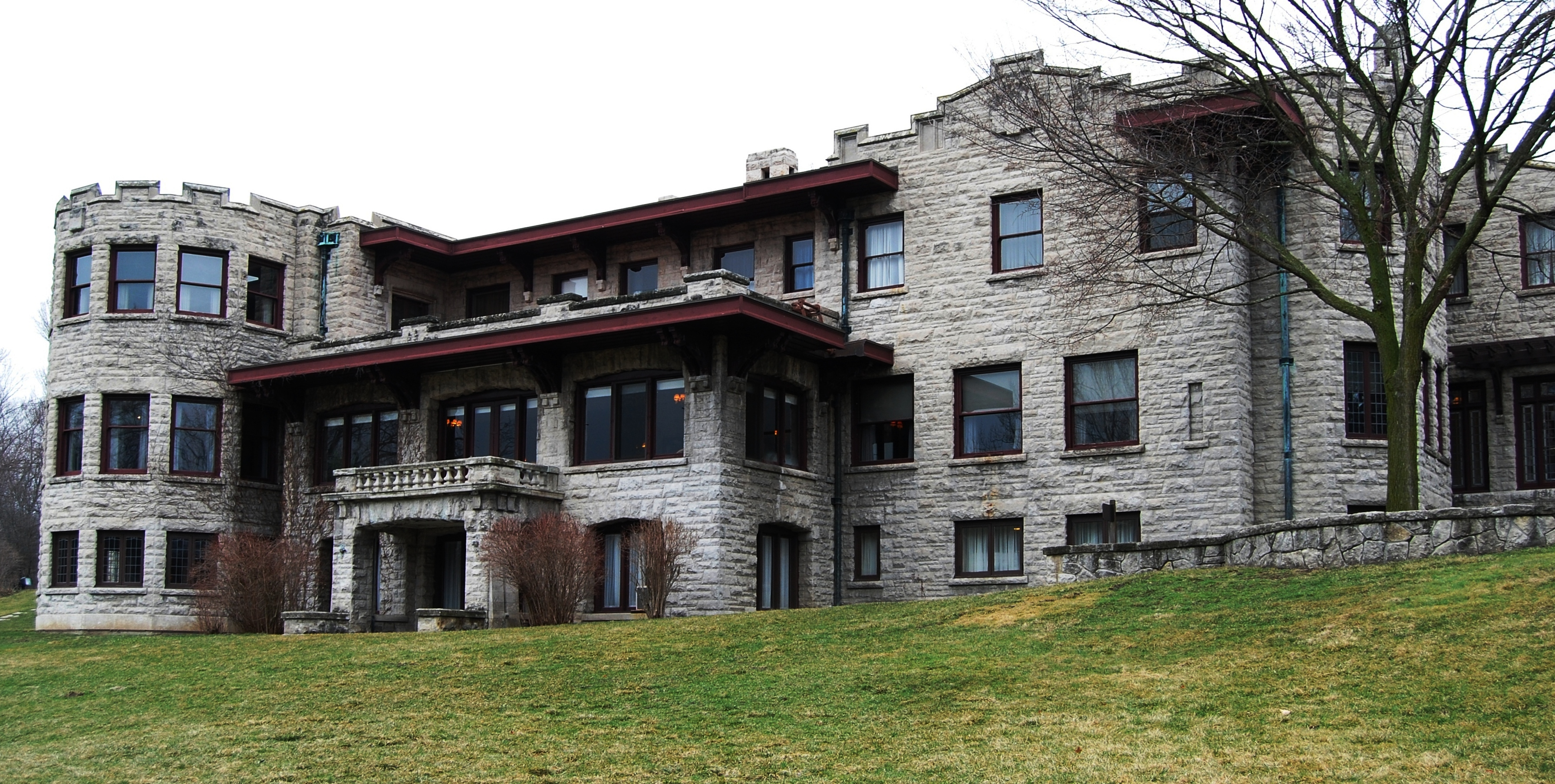
The Rouge River side of Fair Lane

Construction began on Fair Lane in 1913, but the original contract was dissolved due to a monetary dispute in February 1914. Clara found the architect who completed the project, William Van Tine, while on a shopping trip in New York on a recommendation. Clara oversaw much of the design, furnishing, and construction of the home, gardens, and greenhouses, working with Jens Jensen and the tradespeople toward its completion in 1915.

Today, a statue of Henry and Clara Ford stands in the Rose Garden of Fair Lane.

== Public life ==
=== Philanthropic and activist efforts ===
With the success of Ford Motor Company and the Model T, philanthropic interests became important to both Clara and Henry Ford.

==== Farming and gardening ====
One of their first philanthropic efforts was the Gulley Farm, which Henry gave to Clara in 1908. Clara hired her brother, Fred Bryant, to manage the farm and its twelve workers. When Ford became a member of the Board of Council for the Protestant Orphan Asylum of Detroit, the farm became a resource for the orphaned boys, learning farming in exchange for housing, clothing, and food. Clara, with landscape designer T.G. Phillips, oversaw the alterations to the property.

An avid gardener, Clara was the president of the Women's National Farm & Garden Association (1927-1934). She hosted many events at Fair Lane, including the 1930 National meeting. During her tenure, she began a "Roadside Market" program which created an opportunity for rural women to earn their own income selling their produce at roadside stands. Her legacy in the organization was cemented with increased marketing of the Association, expansion of the Michigan Division, and development of new scholarships and partnerships. She served as the president of the National Farm and Garden Bureau. Amidst the Great Depression, she encouraged employees of Ford Motor Company to create urban gardens to aid in food production.

Locally, Clara Ford founded the Garden Club of Dearborn, serving as its first President between 1915 and 1920.

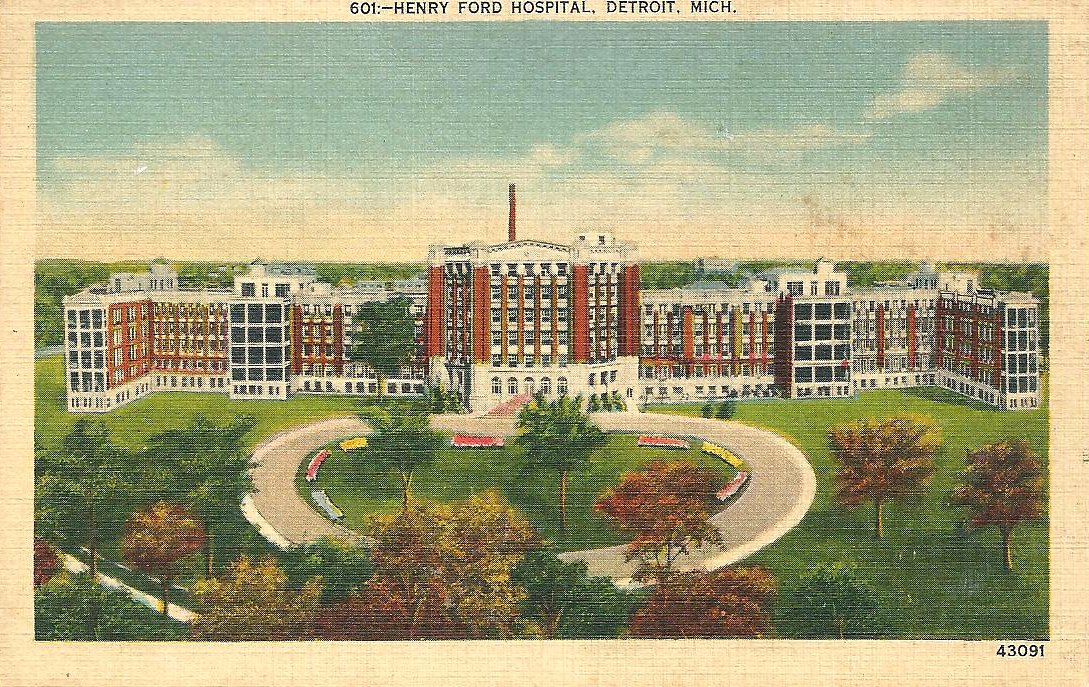
Henry Ford Hospital postcard, Detroit, MI

==== Health and healthcare ====
Clara gave the Women's Hospital of Detroit access to the farm for a hospital annex in 1918, providing aid to new mothers who did not have family support. With this program, a graduate nurse taught mothers homemaking and childcare skills. In 1925, after the establishment of what is now the Henry Ford Hospital in Detroit, a nursing program was established with a "School of Home Arts," which then became the Henry Ford School of Nursing and Hygiene. Clara took a special interest in the design and development of the school and residences, working with architect Albert Kahn. Together, they created the "Clara Ford Nurses' Home and Education Building," which provided a fully-furnished campus with 300 bedrooms with ensuite bathrooms, and spaces for gathering.

==== Women's rights ====
During her life, Ford was an active suffragist and advocate for women. In 1918, she became the Vice-Chair of the Equal Suffrage League of Wayne County, Michigan, an organization dedicated to securing the right to vote for Michigan women. She routinely held meetings at Fair Lane, and utilized her husband's influence and company, holding occasional meetings at the Fordson Tractor Plant to distribute informational material about the cause to more than 7,000 attendees. Clara then served on the Board of Directors of the League of Women Voters of Michigan.

In addition to her advocacy for the right to vote, Clara convinced Henry Ford to sell 50 acres of land to the Sisters of Good Shepherd to expand their shelter operations in 1942. This land is now the 37-acre campus of Vista Maria, a residential safe haven for young women and girls from abuse, neglect, and trauma. Similarly, Clara Ford generously funded Planned Parenthood from 1945 until her death in 1950.

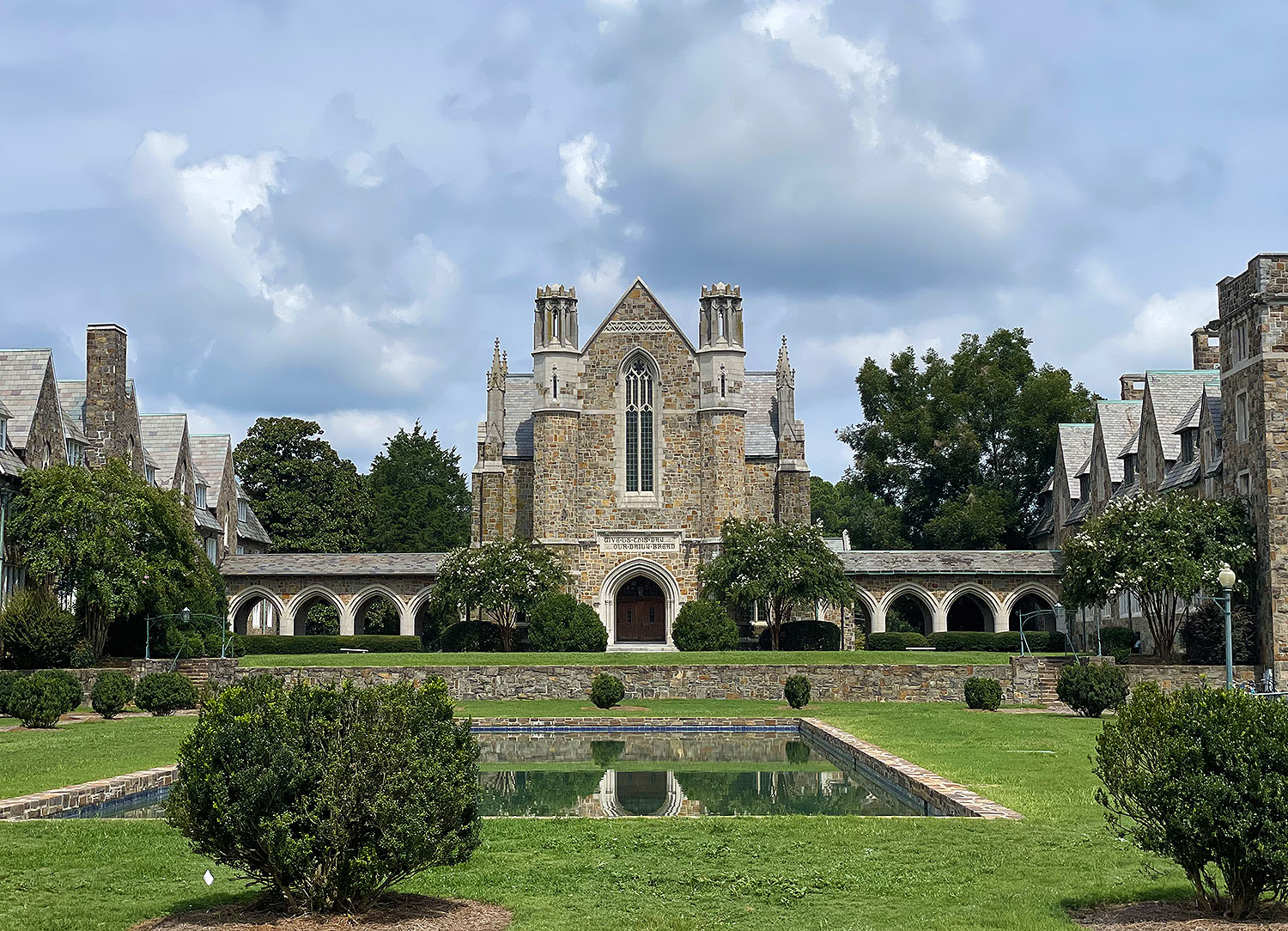
Ford Buildings - Berry College, Rome, GA

=== Berry College ===
In addition to her activism, Clara with the help of her husband, supported educational facilities in expansion of their campuses, particularly Berry College. After meeting Martha Berry during a visit to Thomas and Mina Edison, the couple was invited to Rome, Georgia to tour the campus. This tour resonated with the couple, beginning a decades long relationship with Berry, and significant investment on the part of the Fords - including a new dormitory, named Clara Hall, the Henry Ford Chapel, and a Mary Hall, named after Henry's mother. With the Fords' aid, the College grew to an impressive 30,000 acres in the 1930s.

== Later life and death ==
Clara Bryant Ford died on September 29, 1950, at Henry Ford Hospital in Detroit.

== Bibliography ==
- Bryan, Ford R. (2002). Clara: Mrs. Henry Ford. Wayne State University Press. ISBN 9780814329887.
