= Henry Ford House =

Henry Ford House may refer to:

- Henry Ford Estate, part of the Edison and Ford Winter Estates in Fort Myers, Florida
- Henry Ford Birthplace, a house in the Greenfield Village in Dearborn, Michigan
- Henry Ford House, a house in the Boston-Edison Historic District in Detroit, Michigan
- Henry Ford Square House, a house in Garden City, Michigan
- Fair Lane, Henry Ford's estate in Dearborn, Michigan
- John Pennington–Henry Ford House, Macon, Michigan
