= Gerald R. Ford Jr. House =

Historic house in Virginia, United States

- President Gerald R. Ford Jr. House
- U.S. National Register of Historic Places
- U.S. National Historic Landmark
- Virginia Landmarks Register
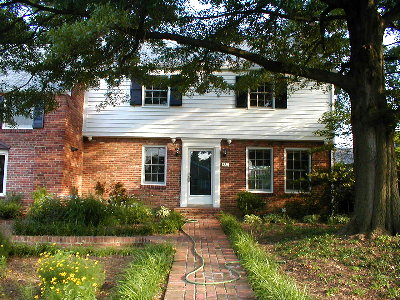

- Location within Alexandria Location within Virginia
- Location: 514 Crown View Dr., Alexandria, Virginia
- Coordinates: 38°48′47″N 77°4′47″W
- Built: 1955
- Architect: Purins, Viktors
- NRHP reference No.: 85003048
- VLR No.: 100-0165

Significant dates
- Added to NRHP: December 17, 1985
- Designated NHL: December 17, 1985
- Designated VLR: March 19, 1997

The President Gerald R. Ford Jr. House is a historic house at 514 Crown View Drive in Alexandria, Virginia. Built in 1955, it was the home of Gerald Ford from then until his assumption of the United States presidency on August 9, 1974. The house is typical of middle-class housing in the northern Virginia suburbs of Washington from that period. It was listed on the National Register of Historic Places and declared a National Historic Landmark in 1985 for its association with the Fords.

== Description and history ==
The Ford House is located in a suburban residential area of central Alexandria, on the south side of Crown View Drive near its northwestern end. It consists of a rectangular 2-story main block with a two-story eastern section that once housed a garage on the ground floor and the master bedroom above. A single-story ell extends to the rear, and a 20-by-40-foot (6.1 m × 12.2 m) swimming pool was added by the Fords in 1961. The Secret Service converted the garage into a command post when Ford became Vice President of the United States in 1973.

The house was built in 1955 for Gerald Ford, then a member of the United States House of Representatives from Michigan. Ford and his family made this house their primary residence from the time of its construction until they moved into the White House on August 19, 1974, following the resignation of President Richard M. Nixon.

Between his swearing-in on August 9 and his final morning at Alexandria, the U.S. presidential residence had been on Crown View Drive, and President Ford had been driven every morning and evening, along with his Secret Service escorts and with help from the Alexandria police, to 1600 Pennsylvania Avenue in Washington. The house is representative of the period in Ford's career when he rose to become one of the nation's most influential Congressmen, and set the stage for his ascent to the Presidency.

== Gallery ==
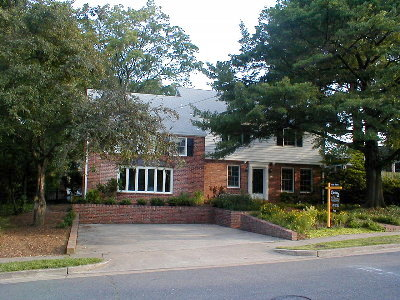

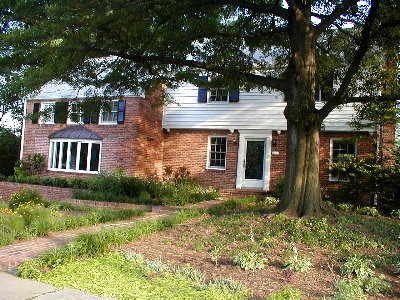

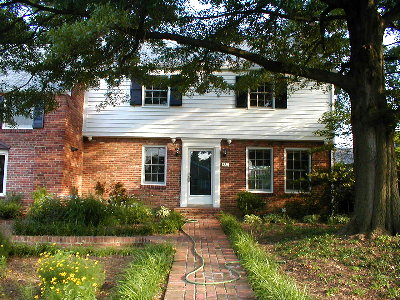

== See also ==
- President Gerald R. Ford Jr. Boyhood Home, in Michigan
- List of National Historic Landmarks in Virginia
- List of residences of presidents of the United States
- National Register of Historic Places listings in Alexandria, Virginia
