= Hebard–Ford Summer House =

Historic house in Michigan, United States

- U.S. National Register of Historic Places
- Michigan State Historic Site
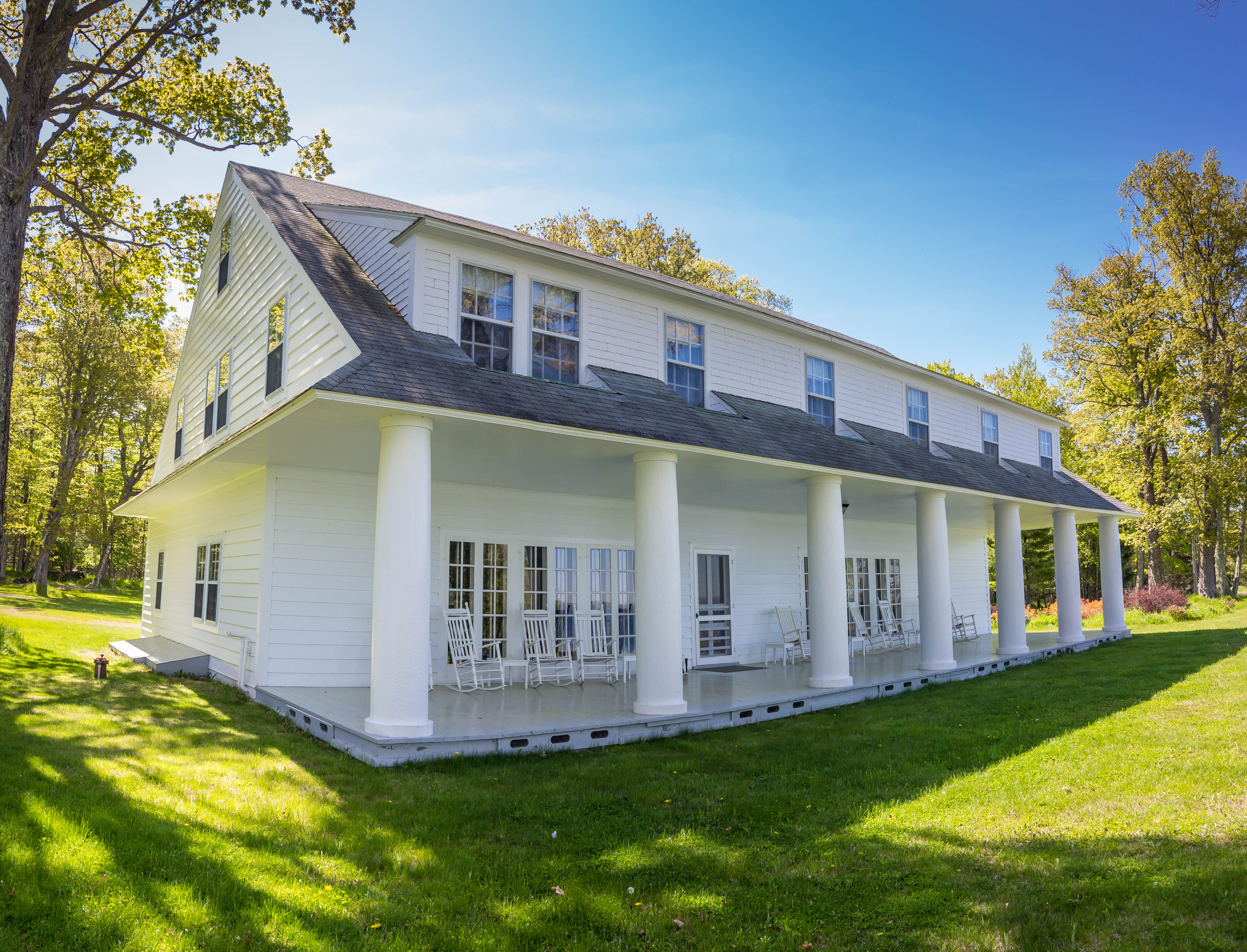
- Hebard–Ford Summer House, 2019

- Location within Michigan Location within the United States
- Interactive map
- Nearest city: L'Anse, Michigan
- Coordinates: 46°51′33″N 88°23′50″W
- Area: 4.5 acres (1.8 ha)
- Built: 1914
- Architectural style: Bungalow/craftsman
- NRHP reference No.: 82002824

Significant dates
- Added to NRHP: May 5, 1982
- Designated MSHS: September 10, 1979

The Hebard–Ford Summer House is a private house located north of L'Anse, Michigan in Pequaming, Michigan. It is also known as the Ford Bungalow. The house was designated a Michigan State Historic Site in 1979 and listed on the National Register of Historic Places in 1982.

== History ==
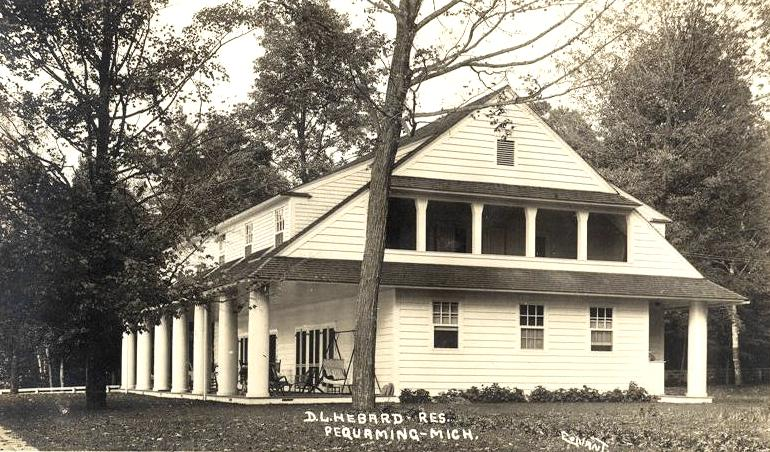
Hebard–Ford Summer House, c. 1910s

In 1878, lumber baron Charles Hebard founded the logging town of Pequaming nine miles north of L'Anse on the shore of Lake Superior. It was the first large-scale lumbering operation in the Upper Peninsula. Hebard built and owned all the buildings in the town, including approximately 100 houses built for workers. The population of Pequaming peaked at around 800 in 1897. Charles Hebard died in 1904, passing his lumber business and the town of Pequaming to his sons, Daniel and Charles.

In 1914, Daniel Hebard built this lodge as his periodic residence. In 1923, the brothers sold the operation to Henry Ford; although Ford was primarily interested in the Hebard's 40,000 acres of timber, the brothers insisted he buy the sawmill and the town at the same time. Ford used the town to produce wooden pieces for the frames and bodies of Ford stationwagons. Henry Ford took over Daniel Hebard's lodge for his own personal use, and summered here from 1923 to 1941.

However, Ford's need for lumber dropped during the Great Depression, and shipping problems during World War II spelled the end for Pequaming's mill. Ford shut the plant down in 1942; with the loss of jobs, most families soon left the town.

The Hebard–Ford house is currently privately owned, but available as a vacation rental.

== Description ==
The Hebard–Ford house is a rectangular, two-story lodge built in the Bungaloid style. It is of frame construction, covered with white clapboards, with a low gable roof with long shed dormers. A veranda is contained under the roofline, which is supported with seven cement pillars. The main floor has double hung, six-over-six paned windows with dark trim, and two sets of French doors open onto the veranda. Inside are eight bedrooms, seven bathrooms, a large living room, a dining room, and an office. Outside was a caretaker's residence, a formal garden and a tennis court.

The house reflects a gracious style of living that rich industrialists valued in northern Michigan vacation lodges.
