= Jacob Ford House =

Historic house in New York, United States

- U.S. National Register of Historic Places
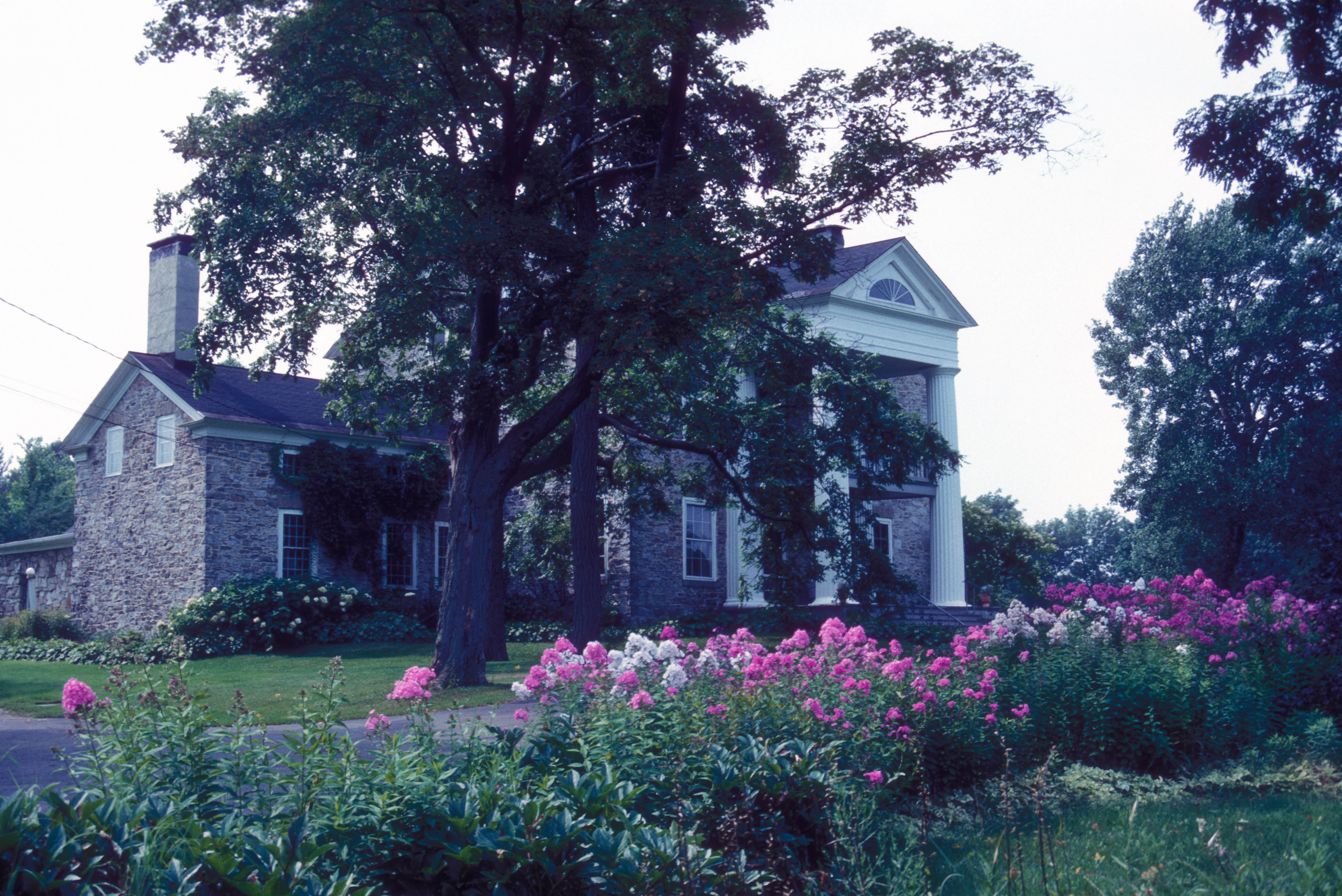

- Location within New York Location within the United States
- Location: Northumberland St. Morristown, New York, U.S.
- Coordinates: 44°35′9″N 75°39′9″W
- Area: 7 acres (2.8 ha)
- Built: 1837
- Architectural style: Federal
- MPS: Morristown Village MRA
- NRHP reference No.: 82004684
- Added to NRHP: September 2, 1982

Jacob Ford House is a historic home located at Morristown in St. Lawrence County, New York. It is a 2 1/2-story rectangular stone structure with a gable roof, built in 1837 in a late Federal style. There is a 1 1/2-story wing on the south side. The front features a portico added about 1890.

It was listed on the National Register of Historic Places in 1982.
