= Ford R. Bryan =

American chemist

- Born: Ford Richardson Bryan; May 13, 1912; Crystal Township, Montcalm County, Michigan, U.S.
- Died: May 14, 2004 (aged 92); Dearborn, Michigan, U.S.
- Occupations: Chemist, author
- Spouse: Ellen Juntunen (died 1980)
- Parents: Frederick Charles Bryan (father); Nettie Richardson (mother)
- Family: Henry Ford II (fourth cousin)

Ford Richardson Bryan (May 13, 1912 – May 14, 2004) was a member of the Ford family of Dearborn, who provided authentic historical information about the Ford family based almost entirely on the Ford Archives of Henry Ford Museum and associated Greenfield Village.

Born in Crystal, Michigan, Bryan graduated from Eastern Michigan University in 1934; he then received his master's degree from University of Michigan in 1941. From family bibles, family legend, correspondence, and the historical archives of Dearborn, he traced the family history from England to Ireland, then to America, and in 1832 to the wilderness of the Michigan Territory, much of which was included in his book The Fords of Dearborn (ISBN 978-0-9727843-1-3) includes genealogical tables and more than 125 illustrations depicting family members, their farms, homes, and their relationships. Bryan joined Ford Motor Company as a spectrochemical analyst following World War II. Over the course of thirty-three years, he would move on to the Ford Scientific Laboratory, publishing more than seventy technical papers on optical spectroscopy. Following his retirement from Ford, he became a volunteer at the Henry Ford Museum & Greenfield Village. His yen for writing led him to the Ford Archives, where he found a gold mine of material about his own family and about his favorite subject, Henry Ford.

== Works ==
Bryan wrote many books about Henry Ford including:

- Rouge: Pictured in Its Prime
- Friends, Families & Forays
- Clara: Mrs. Henry Ford
- Beyond the Model T: The Other Ventures of Henry Ford
- Henry's Attic: Some Fascinating Gifts to Henry Ford and His Museum
- Henry's Lieutenants
