= Charles Ford House =

Historic house in New York, United States

- U.S. National Register of Historic Places
- Location within New York Location within the United States
- Location: W side of Ford St., S of jct. with Co. Rd. 181, Hamlet of La Fargeville, Orleans, New York
- Coordinates: 44°11′36″N 75°58′17″W
- Area: less than one acre
- Built: c. 1900
- Architectural style: Queen Anne
- MPS: Orleans MPS
- NRHP reference No.: 96001472
- Added to NRHP: December 20, 1996

The Charles Ford House is a historic house located at Orleans in Jefferson County, New York.

== Description and history ==
It is a 2 1/2-story, three-by-two-bay structure built in about 1900 in a vernacular Queen Anne style. It is a side-gabled, clapboard-sided building with a rear 1 1/2-story ell and a full-width front porch. The rear kitchen ell dates to about 1820. Also on the property is a one-story horse and carriage barn.

It was listed on the National Register of Historic Places on December 20, 1996.
