= Ford House (Morgantown, West Virginia) =

Historic house in West Virginia, United States

- U.S. National Register of Historic Places
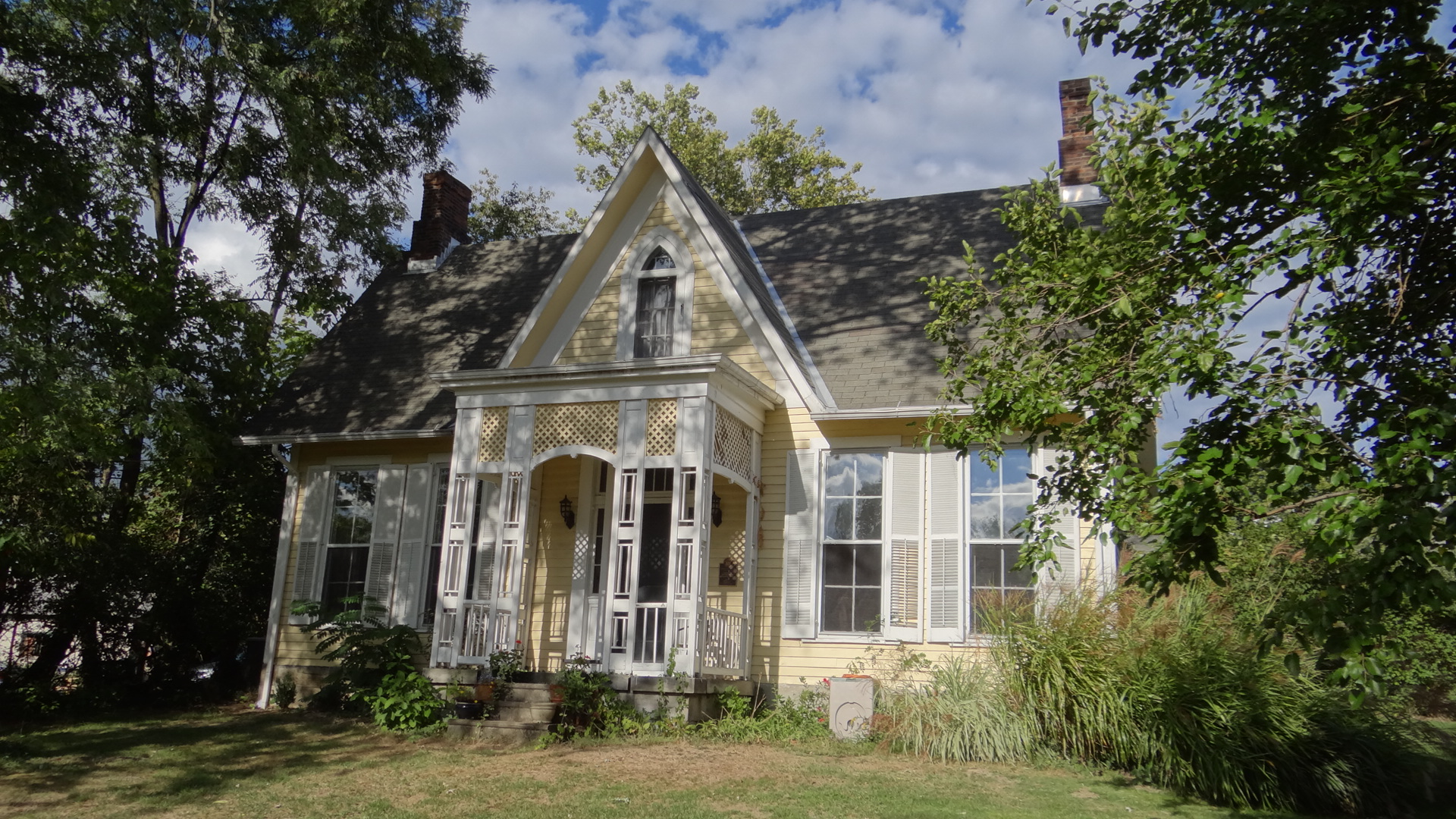

- Location within West Virginia Location within the United States
- Location: 310 Ford St., Morgantown, West Virginia
- Coordinates: 39°37′18″N 79°57′45″W
- Area: less than one acre
- Built: 1868
- Architectural style: Late Gothic Revival
- NRHP reference No.: 93001227
- Added to NRHP: November 15, 1993

Ford House is a historic home located at Morgantown, Monongalia County, West Virginia. It was built about 1868, and is a 1 1/2-story, L-shaped Gothic Revival style cottage. It features a steeply pitched gable roof, a Gothic arched window in the center gable, and lattice work in lieu of bargeboard on the front porch.

It was listed on the National Register of Historic Places in 1993.
