= President Gerald R. Ford Jr. Boyhood Home =

Historic house in Michigan, United States

- U.S. National Register of Historic Places
- Michigan State Historic Site
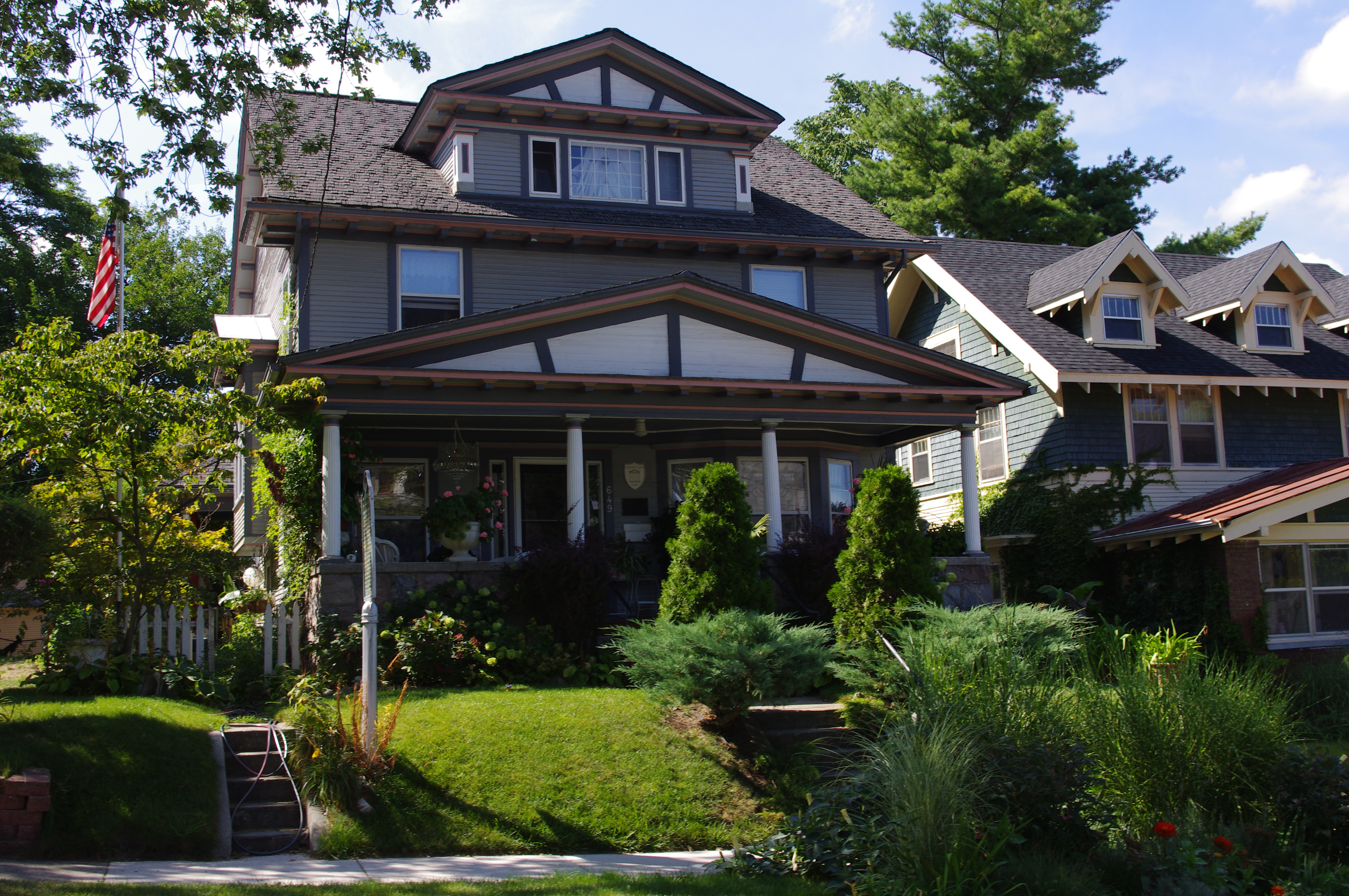

- Location within Michigan Location within the United States
- Interactive map showing the location of President Gerald R. Ford Boyhood Home
- Location: 649 Union Ave. SE, Grand Rapids, Michigan
- Coordinates: 42°57′2.4″N 85°39′15.9″W
- Architectural style: Colonial Revival
- NRHP reference No.: 95000073
- Added to NRHP: February 27, 1995

The President Gerald R. Ford Jr. Boyhood Home is a house located at 649 Union Avenue SE in Grand Rapids, Michigan that is listed on the National Register of Historic Places. Future President Gerald R. Ford lived in the house from 1921 through 1930, when he was between the age of 8 and 17. Of all his boyhood homes, Ford remembered this one most vividly in his autobiography.

== History ==
The house at 649 Union SE was built around 1910. In 1921, Gerald Rudolff Ford suffered financial setback, causing the bank to foreclose on the Fords' home. The family began renting the house on Union Street, and continued renting in until 1925, when they purchased it. While living on Union Street, the younger Gerald Ford attended public schools, first at the Madison School, then South High School, where he participated in organized sports, including, most notably, football. Ford was an All-State center, and during his 1930 senior year, after the family had moved from the Union Street house to East Grand Rapids, was captain of the football team. While living in the house, Ford and his friends used the garage as a social club. Ford recalled, "we learned to play penny-ante poker... it was a great hideaway because my parents wouldn't climb the ladder to the second floor - or so I thought."

It is currently a private residence. In 2013 the house underwent an exterior paint restoration, using seven colors and taking more than 500 man-hours. The work was completed by Third Coast Color Painting Co. of Grand Rapids.

== Description ==
The Union Street house is a 2 1/2-story, Colonial Revival structure clad with weatherboarded. It is basically rectangular in plan, with a single-story porch running across the front and a single-story extension in the rear. The roof has side gables, with a single wide dormer on the front of the house. The windows are primarily double-hung, one over one units, save for the attic story, which contains tripartite windows with a fixed center sash and casement sash on either side.
