= Edsel and Eleanor Ford House =

Historic house in Michigan, United States

- U.S. National Register of Historic Places
- U.S. National Historic Landmark
- Michigan State Historic Site
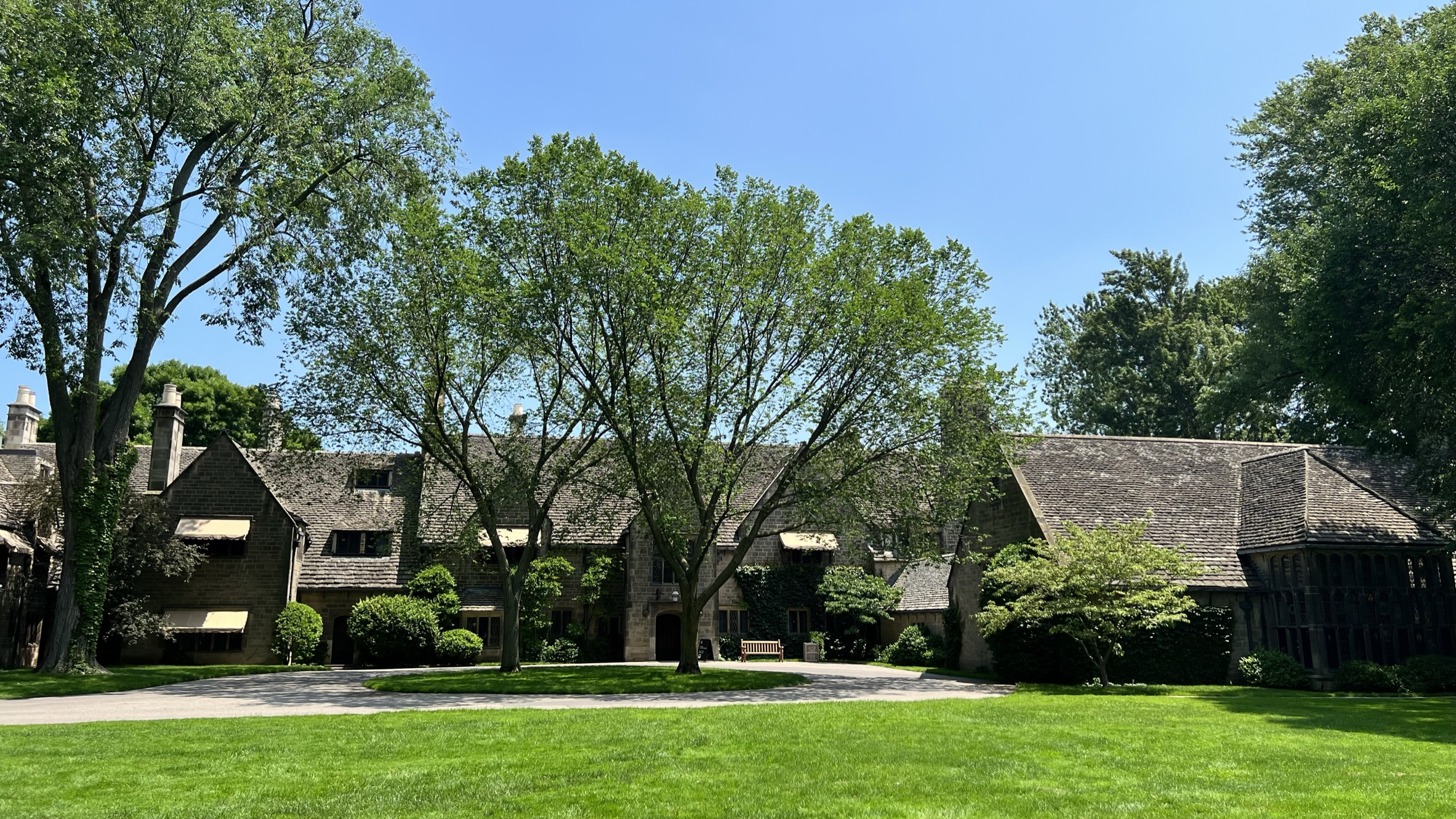
- The front facade of the Edsel & Eleanor Ford House.
- Interactive map showing the Edsel and Eleanor Ford House
- Location: 1100 Lake Shore Drive; Grosse Pointe Shores, Michigan
- Coordinates: 42°27′14.7″N 82°52′8.4″W
- Area: 87.5 acres (35.4 ha)
- Built: 1927
- Architect: Albert Kahn; Jens Jensen
- Architectural style: English Cotswold
- NRHP reference No.: 79001164

Significant dates
- Added to NRHP: July 24, 1979
- Designated NHL: October 31, 2016

The Edsel and Eleanor Ford House is a mansion located at 1100 Lake Shore Drive in Grosse Pointe Shores, northeast of Detroit, Michigan; it stands on the site known as "Gaukler Point", on the shore of Lake St. Clair. The house became the new residence of the Edsel and Eleanor Ford family in 1928. Edsel Ford was the son of Henry Ford and an executive at Ford Motor Company. The estate's buildings were designed by architect Albert Kahn, its site plan and gardens by renowned landscape designer Jens Jensen. The property was listed on the National Register of Historic Places in 1979, and was designated a National Historic Landmark in 2016.

== History ==
=== House ===
The Fords traveled to England with Albert Kahn for the concept's ideas, where they were attracted to the vernacular architecture of the Cotswolds. They asked Kahn to design a house that would resemble the closely assembled village cottages typical of that rural region. Kahn's design included sandstone exterior walls, a traditional slate roof with the stone shingles decreasing in size as they reach its peak, and moss with ivy grown across the house's exterior. Construction on the house began in 1926.

While construction of the house itself took only one year, two years were spent fitting it with antique wood paneling and fireplaces brought from English Manor houses; interior fittings were in the hands of Charles Roberson, an expert in adapting old European paneling and fittings to American interiors. The Gallery, the largest room in the house, is paneled with sixteenth-century oak linenfold relief carved wood paneling. Its hooded chimneypiece is from Wollaston Hall in Worcestershire, England; the timber-framed house had been demolished in 1925 and its dismantled elements and fittings were in the process of being dispersed. A staircase came from Lyveden Manor House, also known as Lyveden Old Bield, second home of Sir Thomas Tresham. Fourteenth century stained-glass window medallions were added to the house in the late 1930s. Roberson's barrel-vaulted ceiling for the Gallery was modeled on one at Boughton Malherbe, Kent, England. Paneling and doors in the Dining Room, entirely devoid of electricity, came from 'New Place', a victim of early twentieth-century expansion in Upminster, a new suburb of London. The Library's paneling and its stone chimneypiece came from the Brudenell seat, Deene Park, Northamptonshire, England. Harris suggests that this already once removed paneling had come from another 'Brudenell seat.' The Study has a wooden overmantel with the date 1585, from Heronden Hall, in Tenterden, Kent.

Other interesting design elements include kitchen counters made of sterling silver, a "secret" photographic darkroom behind a panel of Edsel Ford's office, and Art Deco style rooms designed by Walter Dorwin Teague, a leading industrial designer of the 1930s. Teague's first floor "Modern Room" features 'the new' indirect lighting method, taupe colored leather wall panels, and a curved niche with eighteen vertical mirrored sections. He also designed bedrooms and sitting rooms for all three of Edsel and Eleanor's sons. Teague's design for son Henry Ford II’s bathroom includes grey glass walls made of the same structural glass as its shower stall.

=== Furnishings ===
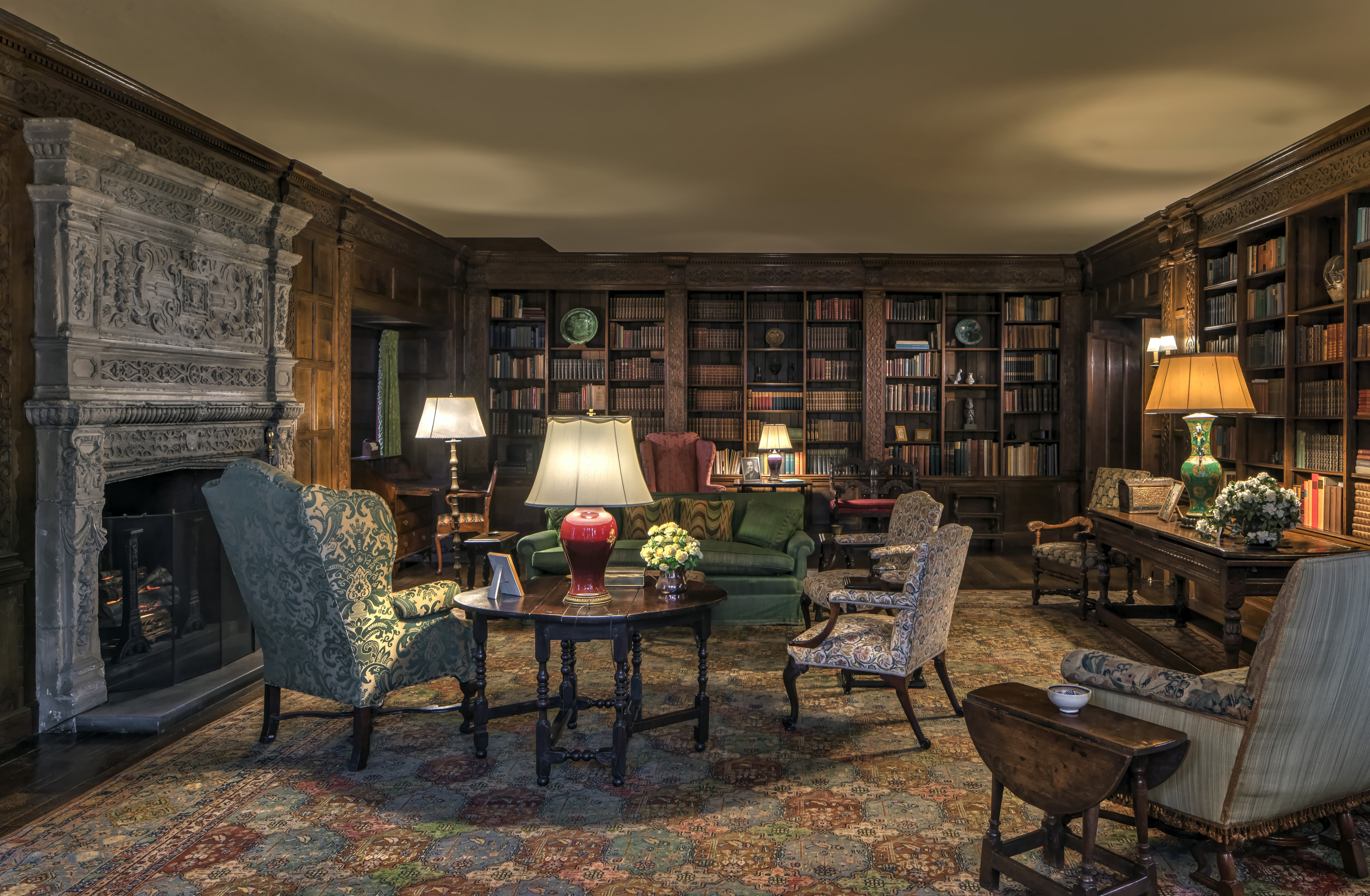
The library at the Edsel & Eleanor Ford House

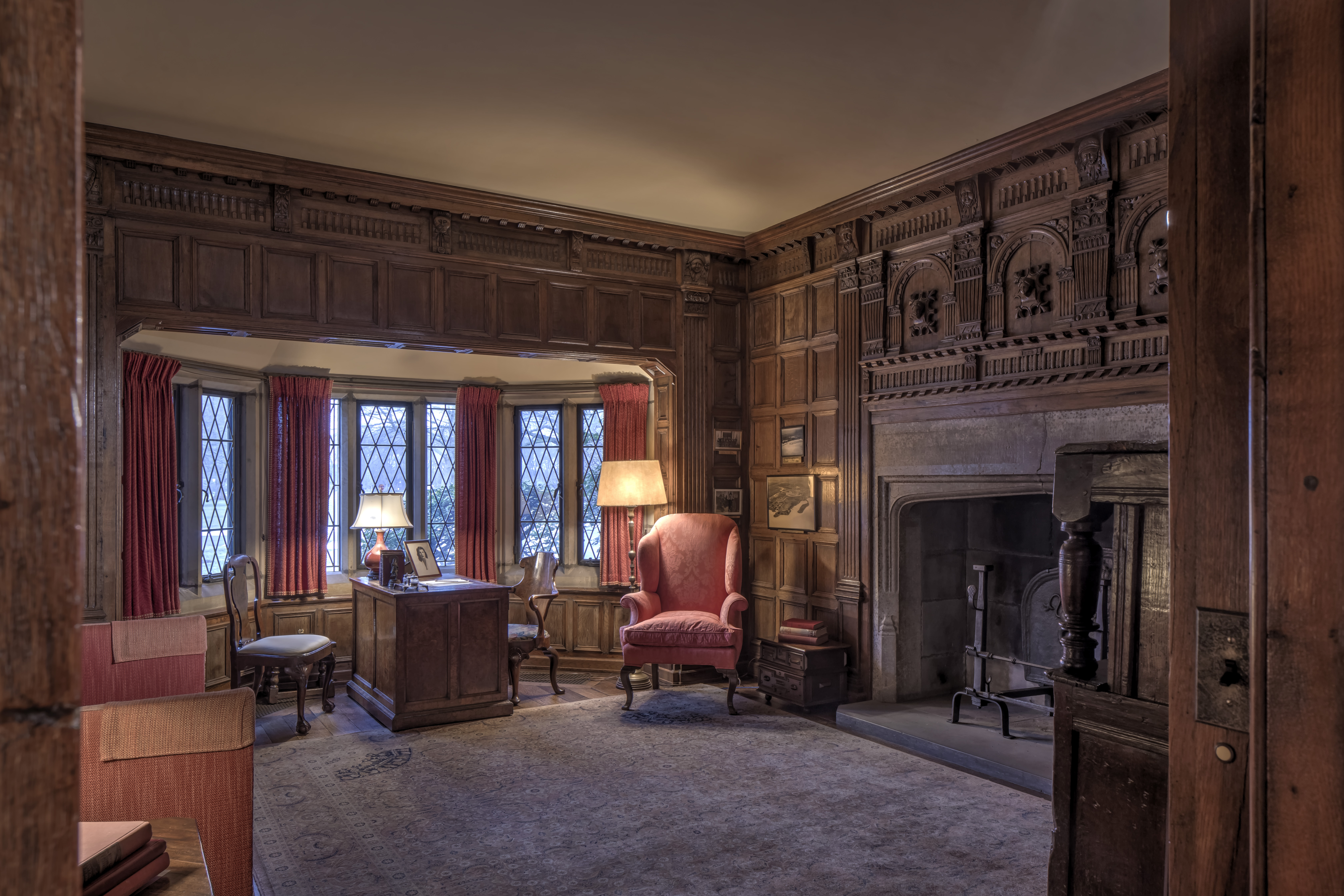
Edsel Ford's Study at Ford House

The house featured an extensive art collection, reflecting Edsel and Eleanor's status as serious museum benefactors. After Eleanor Ford's death, many important paintings were donated to the Detroit Institute of Arts (DIA). Reproductions were hung in their place. The classical French-style Drawing Room features two original Paul Cézanne paintings and reproductions of Pierre-Auguste Renoir and Edgar Degas works. A reproduction of Vincent van Gogh's The Postman Roulin hangs in the Morning Room. An original Diego Rivera painting, Cactus on the Plains, hangs in the Modern Room.

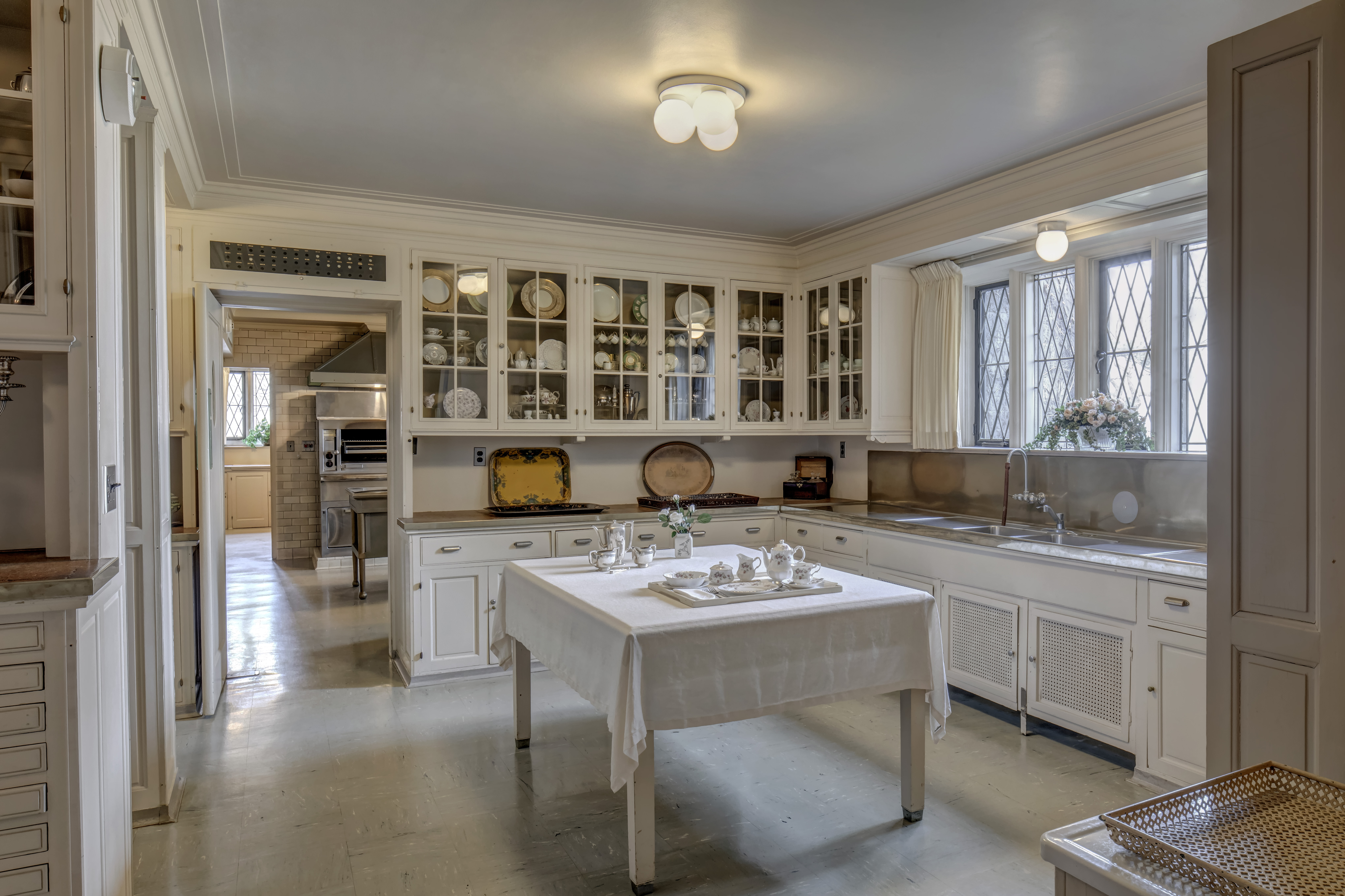
The kitchen at the Edsel & Eleanor Ford House

=== Gardens ===
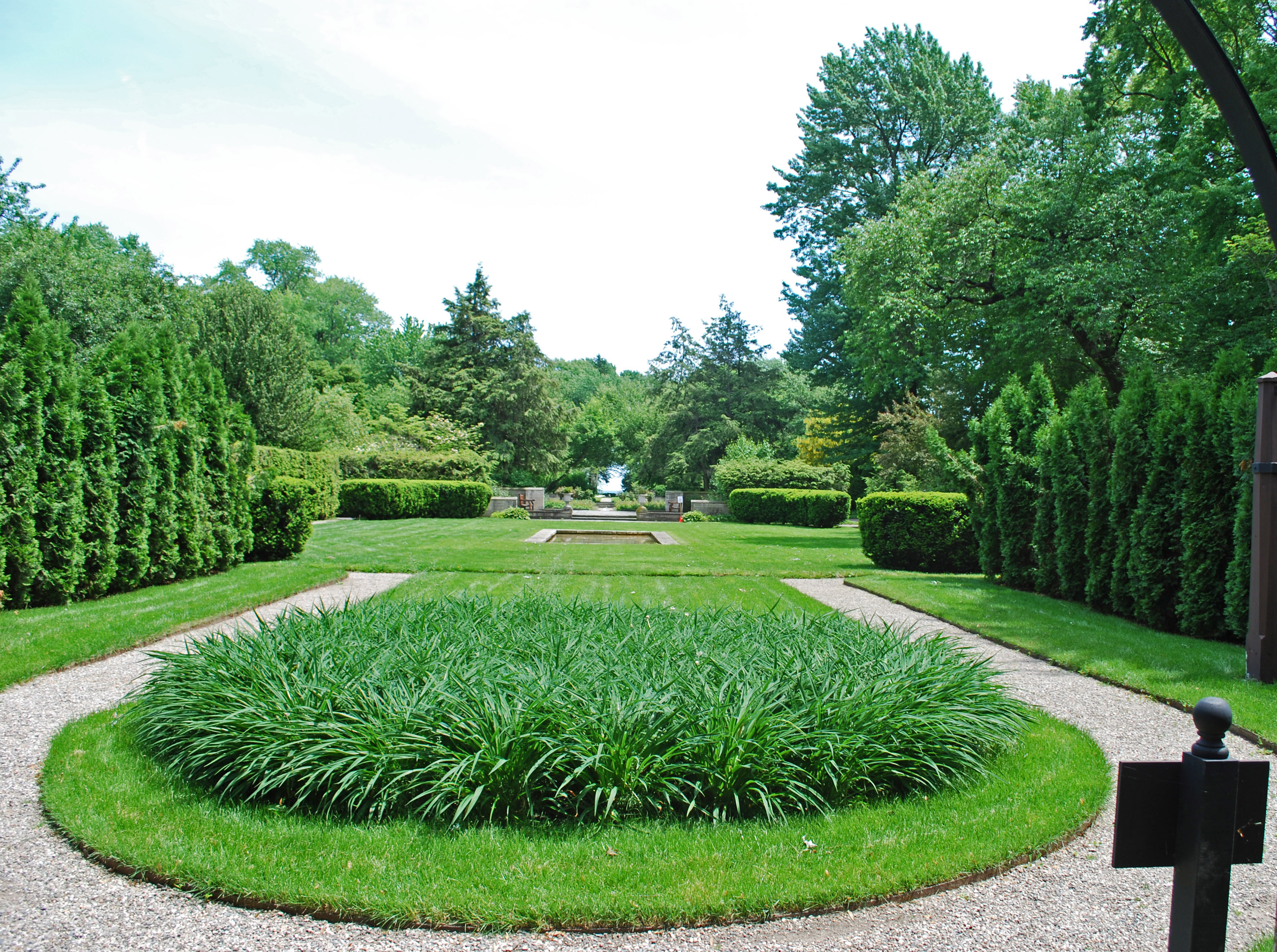
Gardens near the pool

The estate's gardens were designed by landscape architect Jens Jensen with his traditional 'long view,' giving visitors a glimpse of the residence down the long meadow after the passing the entry gates, then brief partial views along the long drive, and only at the end revealing the entire house and another view back up the long meadow.

Mrs. Ford wanted to have a rose garden installed but Jensen originally disapproved of this claiming that it would ruin the landscape which was designed to look completely natural. Jensen had previously quit on Henry Ford and Clara Ford, when Clara wanted to install a rose garden directly in the center of the backyard meadow at the Henry Ford Estate. Eleanor and Jensen eventually came to a compromise and the rose garden was placed behind some native bushes which was out of sight of the meadow that is the focal piece of the front lawn. Jensen's son was contracted later on to install the new garden area which has a reflecting pool and does not have the natural stylizing of the rest of the grounds. Instead he opted for finely trimmed bushes and square grassy areas.

The grounds of the estate include a power house and a gate house along affluent Lake Shore Drive, often mistaken for the actual house. The gate house includes apartments formerly used by staff and an eight-car garage with a turntable to rotate cars so they don't need to back out. The Recreation House beyond the man-made lagoon and swimming pool contains changing rooms and a squash court with spectator's gallery. Closer to the gate house is Josephine Ford's child-sized playhouse, built for her by her grandmother Clara, in 1930. It features working electricity and plumbing and an exterior decorated with characters from nursery rhymes.

For William on his 21st birthday the family enlisted a company which built a full size replica pirate ship on the lagoon as a party showpiece. The party was held outside just off the Apple Patio and featured live acts including Frank Sinatra.

== Museum ==
Edsel Ford died in this house in 1943 and his wife Eleanor Ford lived there until her death in 1976. It was her wish that the property be used for "the benefit of the public". The Edsel & Eleanor Ford House is open to the public for guided tours. Located on 87 acres (350,000 m^{2}) at 1100 Lake Shore Road in Grosse Pointe Shores, the 30,000-square-foot (2,787 m^{2}) house has a fine collection of original antiques and art, and beautiful lakefront grounds. The grounds include the frontage on Ford's Cove, the total Lake St. Clair waterfront of the property is 3,100 feet (985 m). The house currently hosts special events, classes and lectures. The estate is listed on the National Register of Historic Places.

== Restoration ==
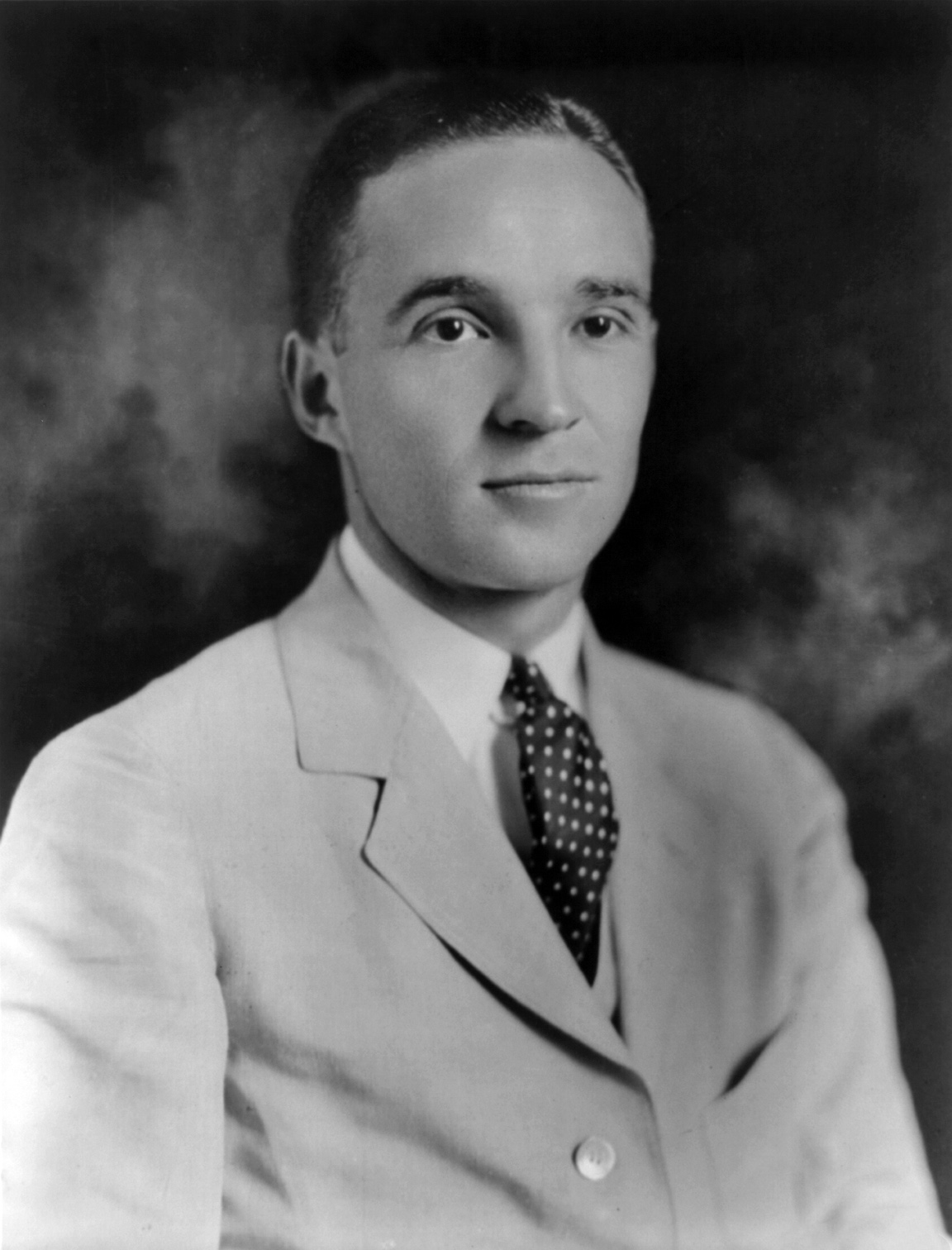
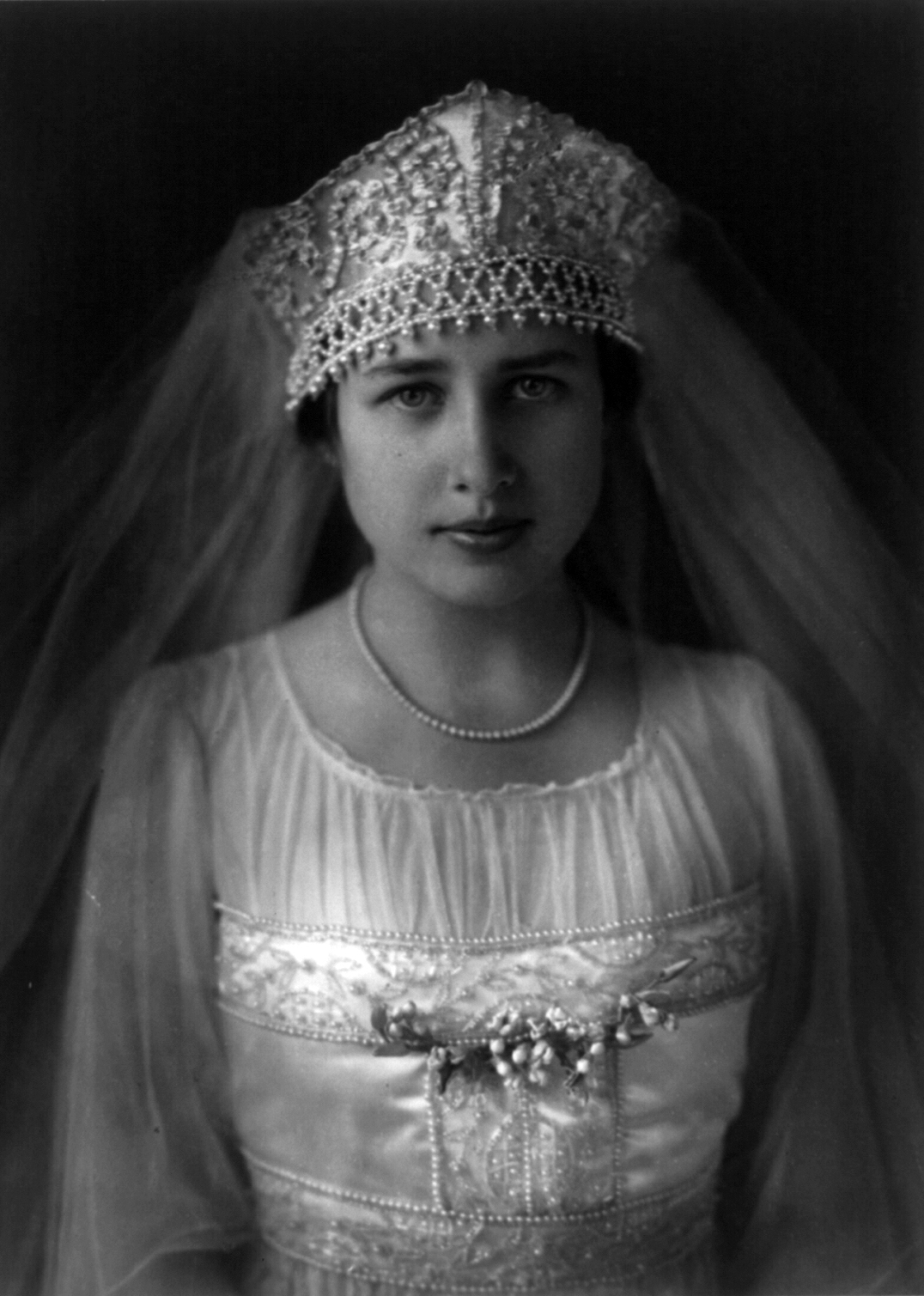
Edsel and Eleanor Ford

Several restoration projects have been started in recent years, most of which were to fix the deteriorating masonry on the main house, the play house, and the various walks. The Edsel Ford house relies on donations as well as an original trust set up by Mrs. Ford to continue restoration work. Mrs. Ford left a total of $15 million when she handed the house over in trust in the 1970s. In 2007 the fund reached a value of $98 million.

The house has undergone multiple large scale restoration projects, including new roofing which was conducted by a firm from England using five professional masons. The roof was torn down to the base wood all of which was replaced where needed. The stone was selected to match the existing stone from the same quarry as the original.

The restoration projects are done by skilled craftsmen who have had proven previous experience in their fields. The foundation selects bidders for projects based on their previous experience, portfolio and firms that can provide near original/original material over pricing to ensure that the estate is restored to the original construction specifications.

The most recent restoration project was to replace the sandstone pillars on the outside of the lakefront patio, which had started to crack around the upper edges. To ensure complete historical accuracy the foundation contracted a firm from the same region from where the original stone was purchased.

There are still many rooms where visitors are not permitted, including the basement. While the estate houses 60-plus rooms as well as other buildings, the public tours usually only showcase 20 of them. Occasionally the other rooms, such as staff living quarters, are showcased in specific tours. Though a number of rooms in the north upstairs wing of the house hold administrative offices, these are not shown to the public. Some of the rooms are still in less than desirable condition, and restoration projects hope to have the entire estate in show-worthy condition within the next few years.

== Gallery ==
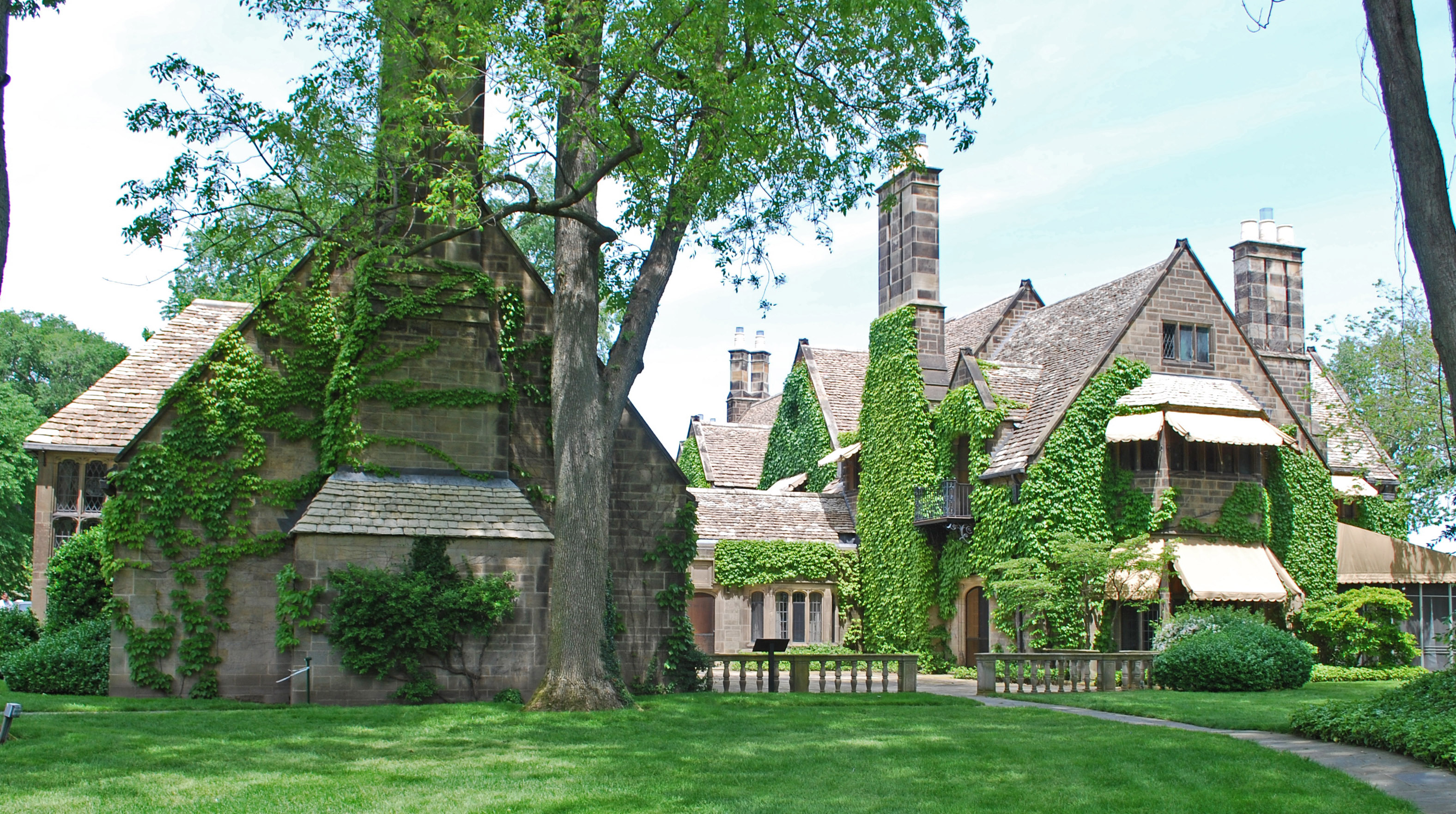
Side of the house

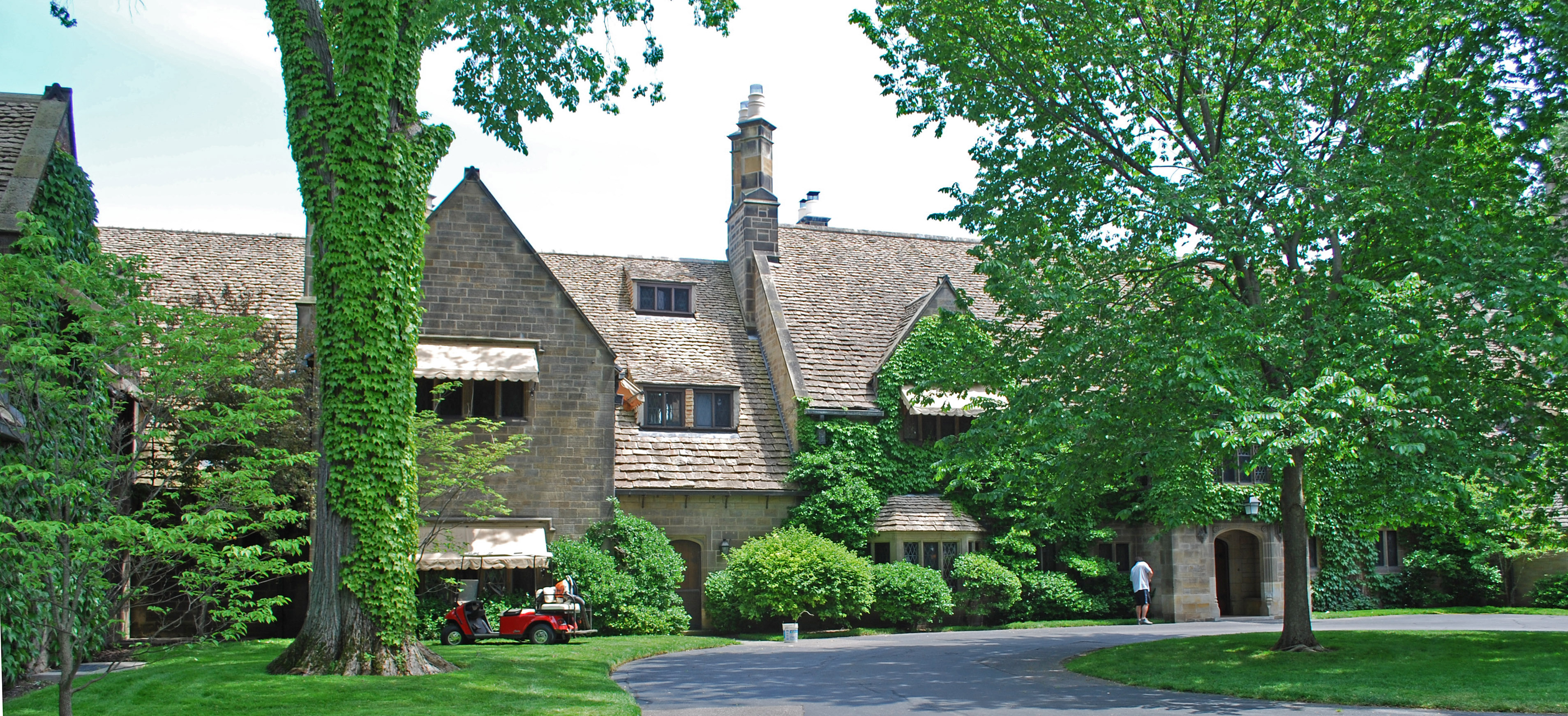
Rear of the house

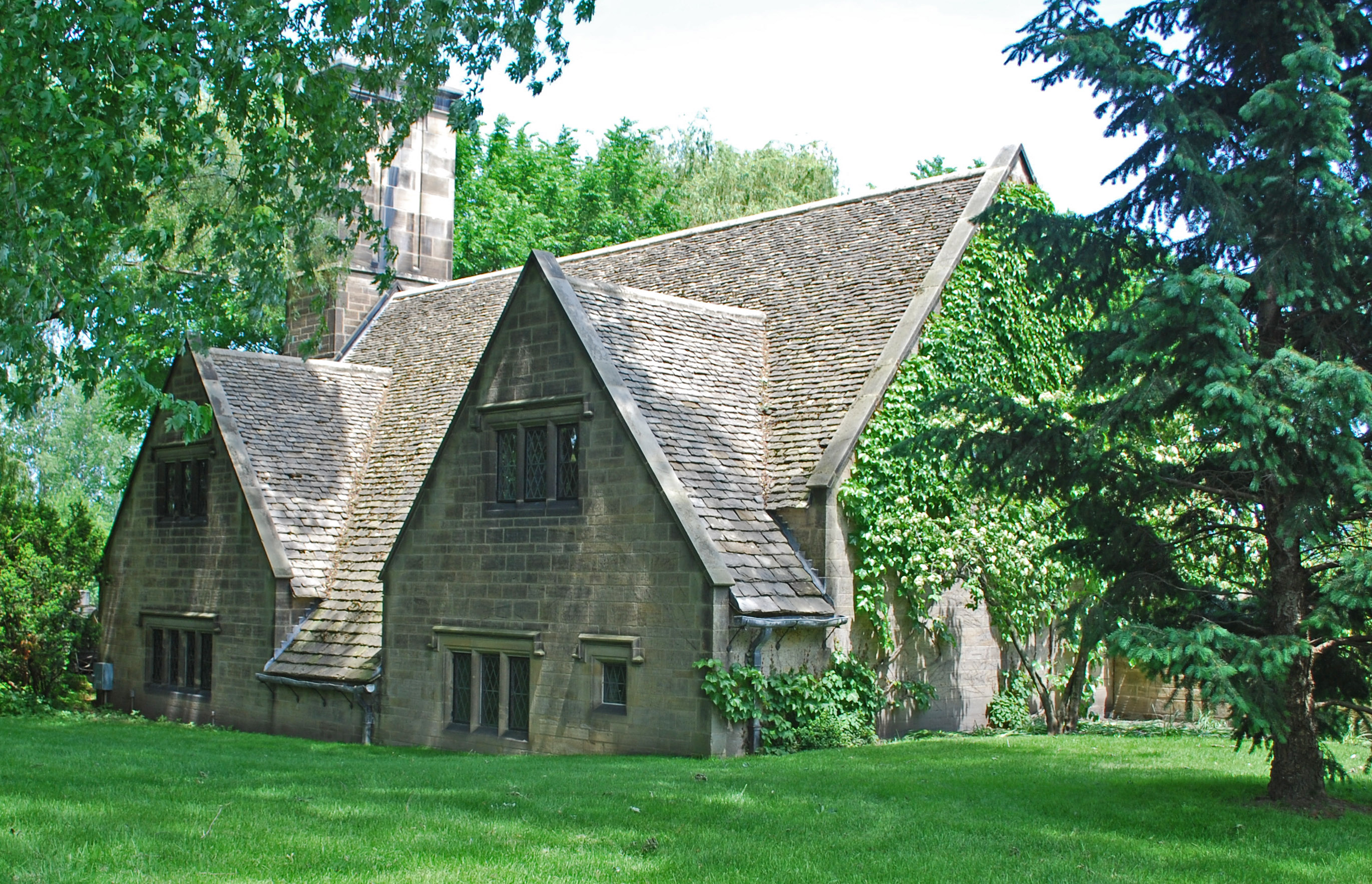
Powerhouse

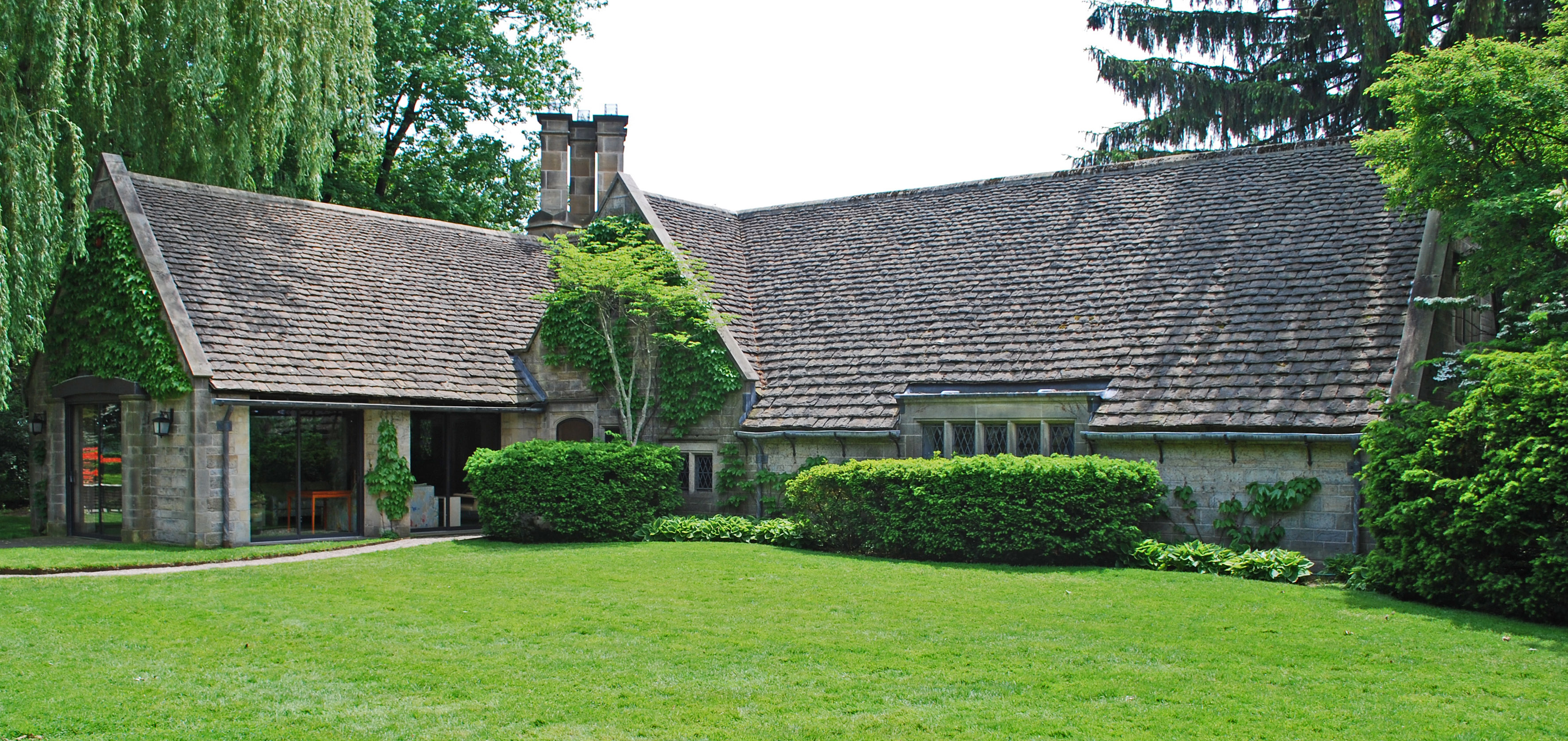
Pool house

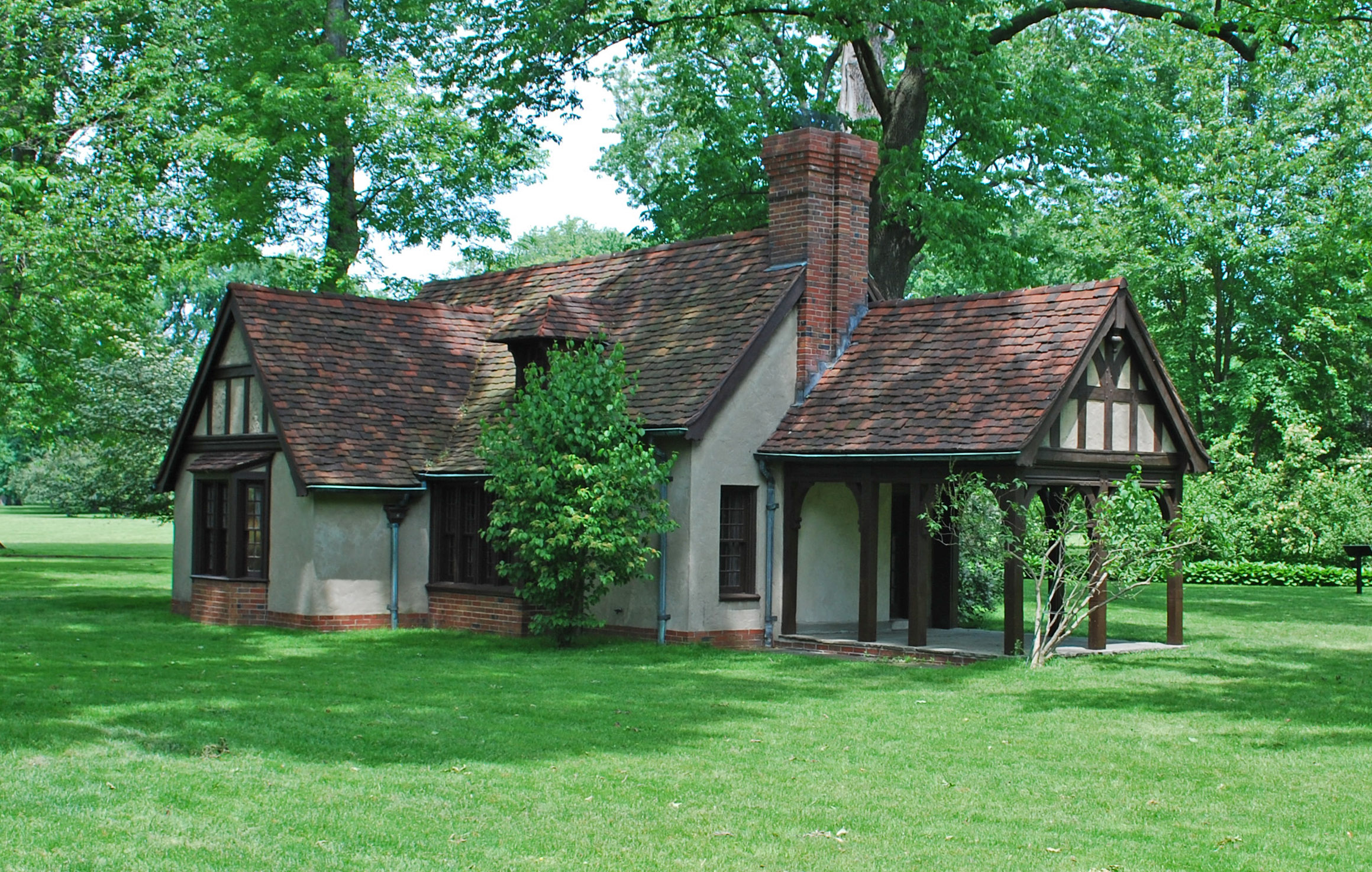
Playhouse

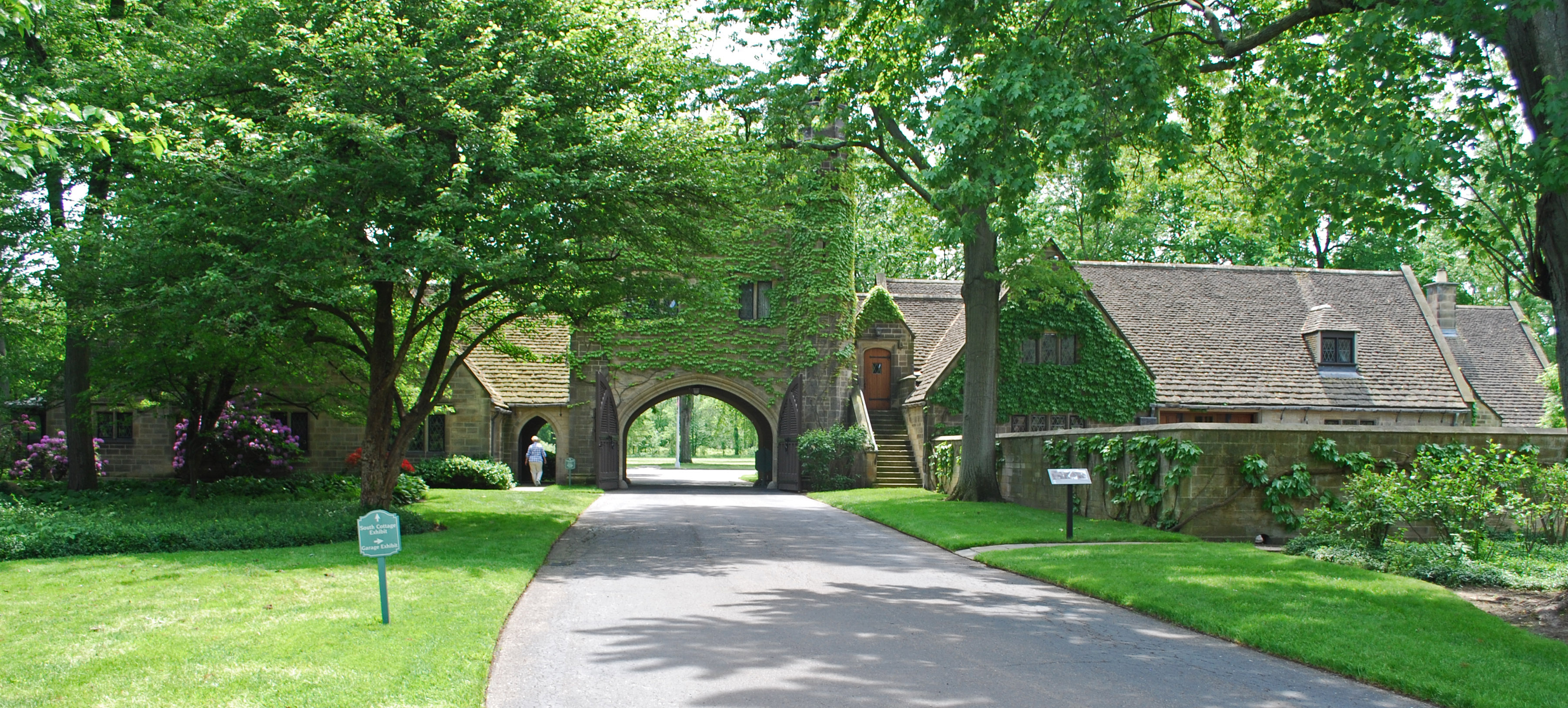
Garage and south cottage

== See also ==
- Detroit Institute of Arts
- Fair Lane
- Ford family tree
- List of National Historic Landmarks in Michigan
- National Register of Historic Places listings in Macomb County, Michigan
