= Henry Ford Square House =

Historic house in Michigan, United States

- U.S. National Register of Historic Places
- Michigan State Historic Site
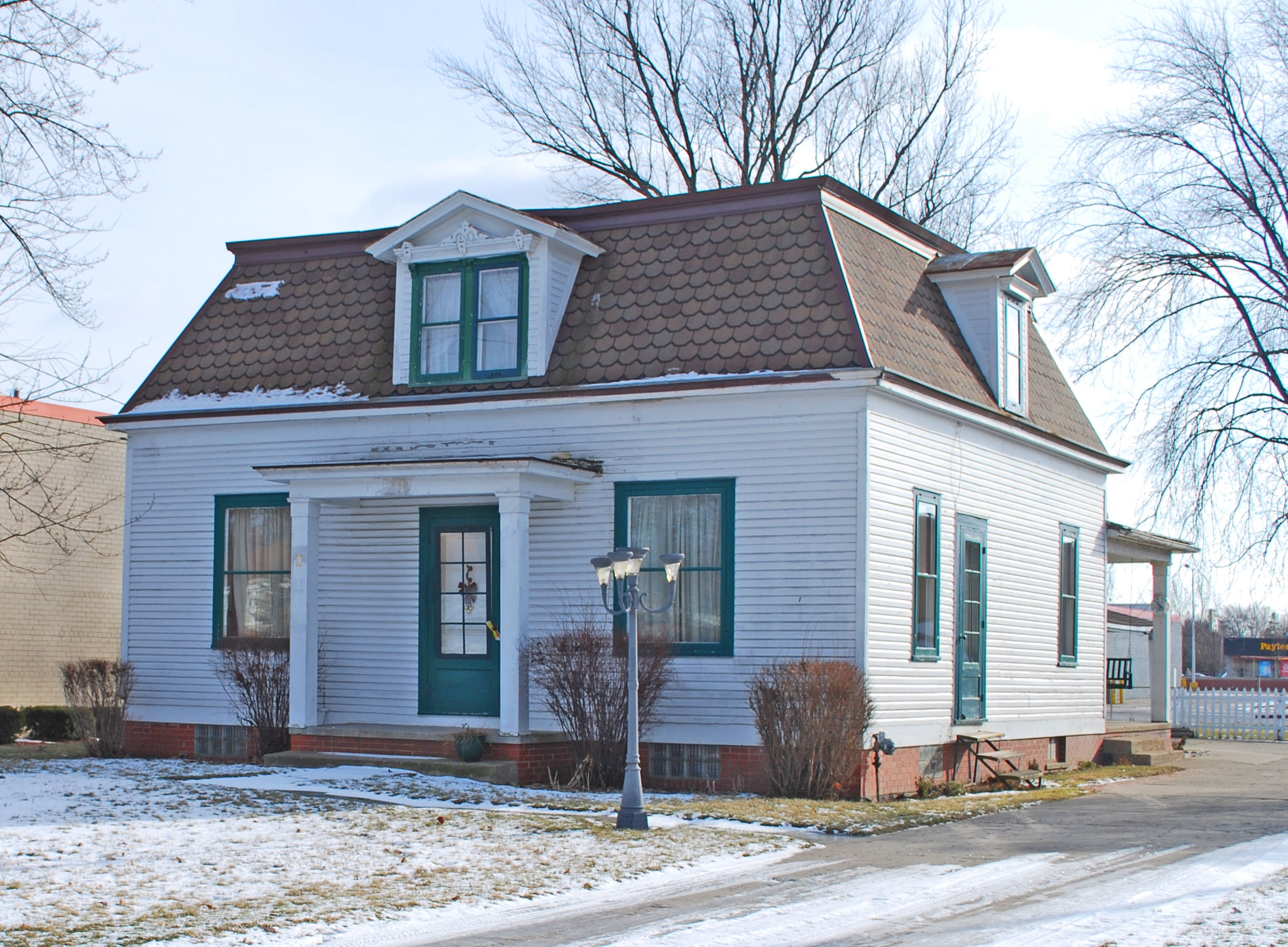

- Location within Michigan Location within the United States
- Interactive map
- Location: 29835 Beechwood Ave., Garden City, Michigan
- Coordinates: 42°19′37″N 83°20′7″W
- Area: less than one acre
- Built: 1888
- Built by: Henry Ford
- Architect: Clara Ford
- NRHP reference No.: 80001932

Significant dates
- Added to NRHP: November 25, 1980
- Designated MSHS: August 3, 1979

The Henry Ford Square House (also known as the Henry Ford Honeymoon House) is a single-family house located at 29835 Beechwood Avenue in Garden City, Michigan. It was designated a Michigan State Historic Site in 1979 and listed on the National Register of Historic Places in 1980.

== History ==
Henry Ford and Clara Jane Bryant were married on April 11, 1888. Soon after, they began construction on this house, then located at the corner of Ford Road and what is now the Southfield Freeway. Clara drew the plans, specifying the kitchen, sitting room, parlor and bedroom. Henry built the house himself, using timber cut on the property and finished in the sawmill he operated. An expert carpenter helped with the fancy-work details, such as the turned balustrades. The couple moved into the house in about June 1889. Ford later added a workshop, where he experimented with gasoline-powered engines.

The Fords lived in this house only until September 1891, when they left for Detroit. However, they retained ownership of the house until 1937, using it as a summer cottage. Ford gave the cottage to an employee, Robert Smith. After the Fords died, the land around the house was bought by the Ford Land Development Corporation, who told Smith to move the cottage to make room for freeway expansion; in 1952, it was moved to its present location. The house was listed on the National Register of Historic Places in 1980.

== Description ==
The Henry Ford Square House is a 2-story square house, 31 feet on each side, with a mansard roof and clapboard siding. The center-entrance front facade has a window cap on the second-floor bedroom window. The interior of the house has a kitchen, dining room, living room, family room, 4 bedrooms, 1 1/2 baths, and a full basement.
