= List of people from Detroit =

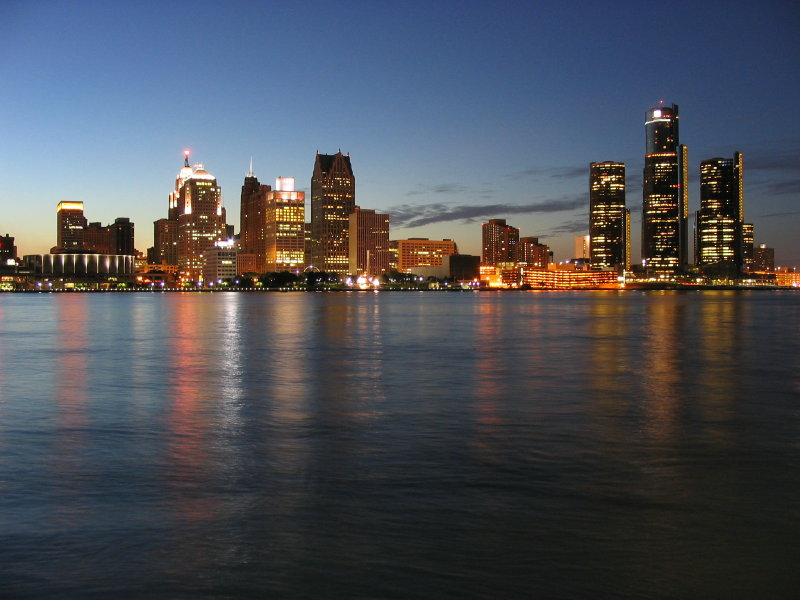
Detroit, as seen from Windsor, Canada

The list of people from Detroit includes those who were born, have lived, or worked in Detroit, Michigan, and in Metro Detroit.

== Activists ==
- Octavia Williams Bates
- Viola Liuzzo
- Gin'nnah Muhammad
- Rosa Parks
- Betty Shabazz
- Jalonne White-Newsome
- Malcolm X

== Artists and designers ==
=== Architects ===
- Charles N. Agree
- C. Howard Crane
- Joseph Nathaniel French
- Francis E. Griffin
- Nathan Johnson
- Beverly Hannah Jones
- Albert Kahn
- Roger Margerum
- Wirt C. Rowland
- Bernard C. Wetzel
- Donald F. White
- Minoru Yamasaki

=== Ceramists ===
- Horace Caulkins
- Tom Lollar
- Diana Pancioli
- Mary Chase Perry Stratton

=== Dancers ===
- Lottie "The Body" Graves

=== Fashion designers ===
- Tracy Reese
- Anna Sui
- John Varvatos

=== Painters ===
- Larry D. Alexander
- Ian Hornak
- Charles McGee
- Allie McGhee
- Gari Melchers
- Eric Millikin
- Niagara
- Carl Owens
- John Mix Stanley
- Carol Wald

=== Photographers ===
- Bill Schwab
- Irakly Shanidze
- Taro Yamasaki

=== Sculptors ===
- Marshall Fredericks
- Mike Kelley
- Julius T. Melchers
- Carl Milles
- Corrado Parducci
- Matt Paweski
- Richard Ritter
- Carlo Romanelli
- Edward Wagner

=== Textile and interior designers ===
- Carole Harris
- Ruth Adler Schnee

== Astronauts ==
- Gregory Jarvis

== Business, industry, academics, and labor ==
- Steve Ballmer
- Elissa P. Benedek
- William E. Boeing
- George Gough Booth
- Bonnie Brennan
- Eli Broad
- Roy D. Chapin
- Roy D. Chapin Jr.
- Nina Clifford
- Bertrand Curtis Spitzley
- William Davidson
- Louis-Césaire Dagneau Douville de Quindre
- John DeLorean
- Horace Elgin Dodge
- John Francis Dodge
- Shel Dorf
- George Doundoulakis
- William C. Durant
- William R. Farrand
- Mark Fields
- Charles T. Fisher
- Alfred Ford
- Edsel Ford
- Edsel Ford II
- Henry Ford
- Henry Ford II
- William Clay Ford Jr.
- William Clay Ford Sr.
- Charles Lang Freer
- Dan Gilbert
- Elizabeth L. Gleicher
- Les Gold
- Berry Gordy
- Edgar Gott
- Tyree Guyton
- Arthur Hayes
- Frank J. Hecker
- Jimmy Hoffa
- Flora Hommel
- Joseph L. Hudson
- Christopher Ilitch
- Denise Ilitch
- Marian Ilitch
- Mike Ilitch
- Peter Karmanos Jr.
- Sebastian S. Kresge
- Henry M. Leland
- Charles Lindbergh
- Michael J. Malik Sr.
- Alex Manoogian
- Oscar F. Mayer
- Elijah McCoy
- Manuel "Matty" Moroun
- Alan Mulally
- David Overton
- Francis Palms
- Roger Penske
- Walter Pitts
- Heinz Prechter
- David Preston
- Ashley Qualls
- Walter Reuther
- Stephen M. Ross
- Jeffrey Sachs
- James E. Scripps
- Robert J. Shiller
- DePrice Taylor, community relations executive for the Kansas City Current and civic leader
- Art Van Elslander
- James Vernor
- Robert J. Vlasic
- Hiram Walker
- B. Joseph White
- Kate Williams
- Ralph Wilson
- Mark Zbikowski

== Clergy and religion ==
- Solanus Casey
- C. L. Franklin
- Lucien Greaves
- Elijah Muhammad
- Wallace Fard Muhammad
- Jack Van Impe

== Government and politics ==
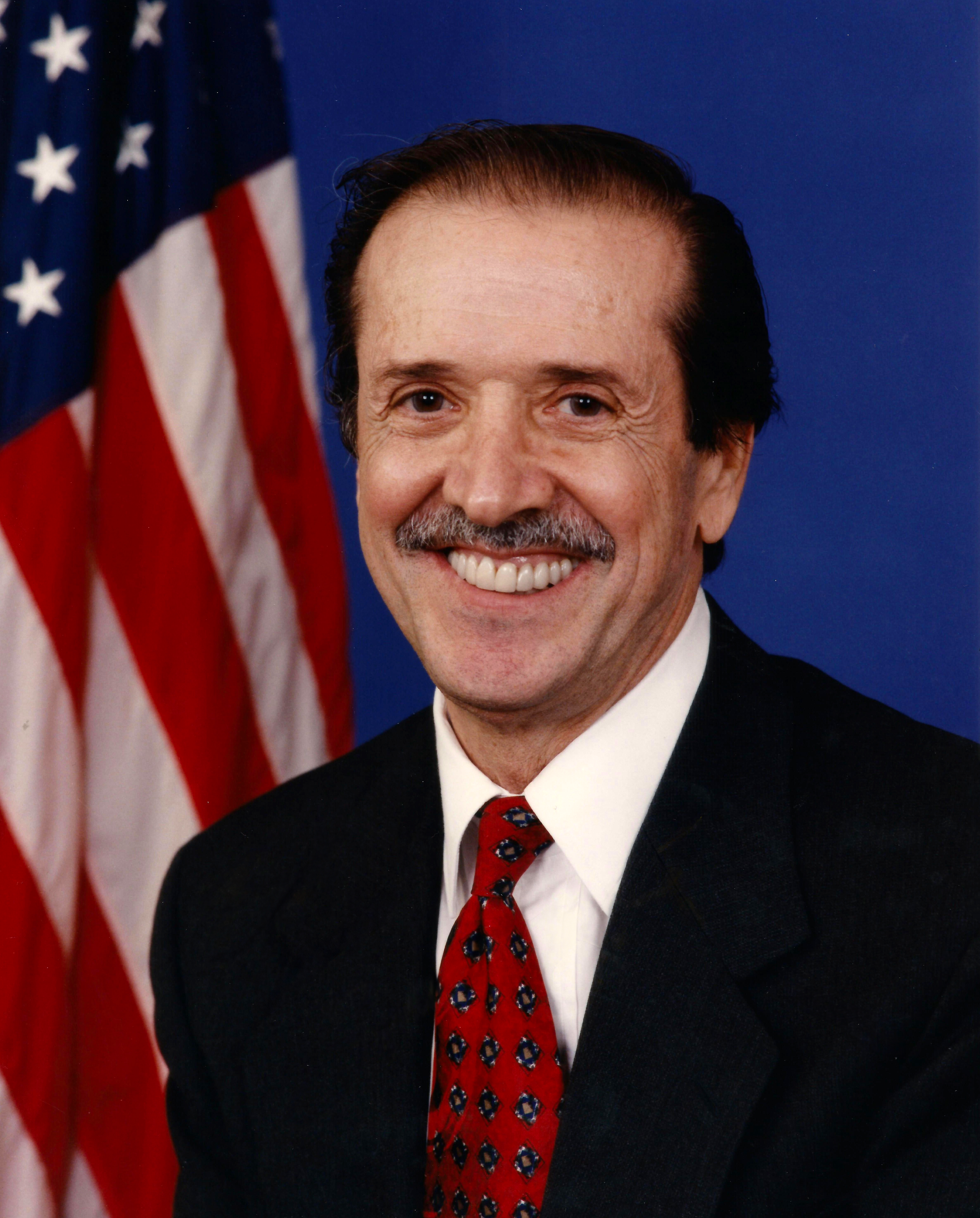
Sonny Bono

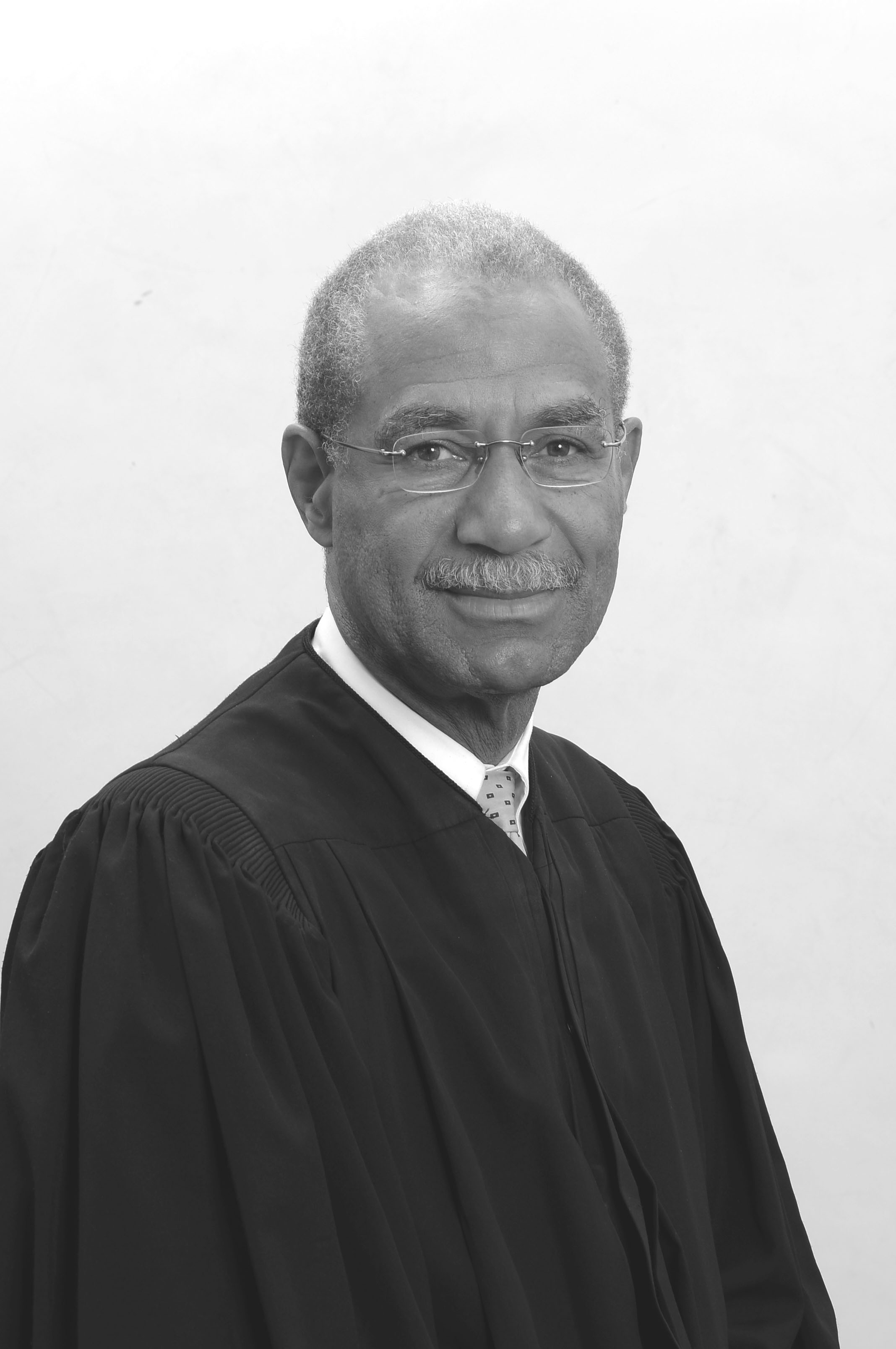
Judge Gershwin A. Drain

- Albert M. Bielawski (1867–1942), member of the Michigan House of Representatives
- James Blanchard (born 1942), U.S. representative for Michigan and governor of Michigan
- Suzanne Bonamici (born 1954), U.S. representative for Oregon
- Sonny Bono (1935–1998), U.S. representative for California
- Walter B. Brady, member of the Michigan House of Representatives
- Cora Brown (1914–1972), first African American woman elected to a state senate who was a member of the Michigan Senate
- Henry Billings Brown (1836–1913), justice of the Supreme Court
- Vern Buchanan (born 1951), U.S. representative for Florida
- Ella Bully-Cummings (born 1958), chief of the Detroit Police
- Ralph Bunche (1904–1971), Nobel Peace Prize winner and diplomat
- Mickey Cafagna (1943–2009), mayor of Poway, California
- Walter H. Campbell (1876–1944), member of the Minnesota House of Representatives
- Ben Carson (born 1951), secretary of Housing and Urban Development
- Lewis Cass (1782–1866), secretary of state and U.S. senator for Michigan
- Roy D. Chapin (1880–1936), secretary of Commerce
- J. Michelle Childs (born 1966), federal judge
- John Conyers (1929–2019), U.S. representative for Michigan
- Leon Czolgosz (1873–1901), anarchist who assassinated president William McKinley
- Francis X. Desnoyers (1813–1868), mayor of Green Bay, Wisconsin and member of the Wisconsin State Assembly
- Thomas E. Dewey (1902–1971), governor of New York
- Debbie Dingell (born 1953), U.S. representative for Michigan
- John Dingell (1926–2019), U.S. representative for Michigan
- John Dingell Sr. (1894–1955), U.S. representative for Michigan
- Gershwin A. Drain (born 1949), federal judge
- Keith Ellison (born 1963), U.S. representative for Minnesota and attorney general of Minnesota
- Jack Faxon (1936–2020), member of the Michigan Senate
- William Webb Ferguson (1857–1910), member of the Michigan House of Representatives
- Moses W. Field (1828–1889), U.S. representative for Michigan
- Burley Follett (1806–1877), mayor of Green Bay, Wisconsin
- Michael Fougere (born 1956), mayor of Regina, Saskatchewan
- Nathan Goodell (1798–1883), mayor of Green Bay, Wisconsin
- Reneé Hall (born 1971), police chief of the Dallas Police Department
- Albert Hammond (1883–1968), member of the Wisconsin State Assembly
- Tom Hayden (1939–2016), member of the California State Senate
- Robert J. Huber (1922–2001), U.S. representative for Michigan
- Tupac A. Hunter (born 1973), member of the Michigan Senate
- Jon A. Husted (born 1967), U.S. senator for Ohio
- Marilyn Jean Kelly (born 1938), chief justice of the Michigan Supreme Court
- Kwame Kilpatrick (born 1970), mayor of Detroit
- T. John Lesinski (1925–1996), member of the Michigan House of Representatives
- Carl Levin (1934–2021), U.S. senator for Michigan
- Henry W. Lord (1821–1891), U.S. representative for Michigan
- Alfred Lucking (1856–1929), U.S. representative for Michigan
- Eileen McNulty (born 1952), Pennsylvania Secretary of Revenue
- John N. Mitchell (1913–1988), United States attorney general
- Frank Murphy (1890–1949), governor of Michigan and Supreme Court justice
- Simon J. Murphy Jr. (1851–1926), mayor of Green Bay, Wisconsin
- John Stoughton Newberry (1826–1887), U.S. representative for Michigan
- Casmer P. Ogonowski (1923–2012), member of the Michigan House of Representatives
- Dorothy Comstock Riley (1924–2004), judge of the Michigan Supreme Court
- Mitt Romney (born 1947), U.S. senator for Utah and governor of Massachusetts
- Henry Hastings Sibley (1811–1891), governor of Minnesota
- Shri Thanedar (born 1955), U.S. representative for Michigan
- Rashida Tlaib (born 1976), U.S. representative for Michigan
- Augustus B. Woodward (1774–1827), judge of Michigan Territory and Florida Territory
- Coleman Young (1918–1997), mayor of Detroit

== Military ==
- Emma Didlake
- Sir Richard England
- Charles Keller
- John Kemp Mizner
- Joseph P. Sanger

== Movie, radio, television, and journalism ==
- Nicole Alexander
- Byron Allen
- Tim Allen
- Maureen Anderman
- Curtis Armstrong
- Lucille Ball
- Joan Barry
- Josh Becker
- Kristen Bell
- Mary L. Bell
- Jim Bellows
- Elizabeth Berkley
- Mike Binder
- Selma Blair
- Bill Bonds
- Jerry Bruckheimer
- Ellen Burstyn
- Dean Cain
- Bruce Campbell
- Bill Carruthers
- Seymour Cassel
- Jessica Cauffiel
- Carol Christensen
- Art Clokey
- Francis Ford Coppola
- Roger Corman
- Dave Coulier
- Wally Cox
- Nicole Curtis
- Vondie Curtis-Hall
- Pam Dawber
- Jude Demorest
- Ryan Destiny
- Doris Dowling
- Wayne Dyer
- Dana Elcar
- Sherilyn Fenn
- Audrey Ferris
- Jeremy David Fisher
- Dann Florek
- Fred Foy
- Max Gail
- Sara Ganim
- Cyndy Garvey
- Marla Gibbs
- Robin Givhan
- Reagan Gomez-Preston
- Chuck Goudie
- Gael Greene
- Judy Greer
- David Alan Grier
- Karl Haas
- Norman Hackett
- Kirsten Haglund
- Chris Hansen
- Elisabeth Harnois
- Julie Harris
- Butch Hartman
- Charlie Hill
- Jemele Hill
- Ellen Hollman
- Telma Hopkins
- Royce Howes
- Ernie Hudson
- Hughes brothers (Albert and Allen Hughes)
- John Hughes
- Tom Hulce
- Kim Hunter
- Darren James
- Al Jean
- Ken Jeong
- Gus Johnson
- Walter Emanuel Jones
- Ella Joyce
- Casey Kasem
- Andrew Keenan-Bolger
- Celia Keenan-Bolger
- Maggie Keenan-Bolger
- Brian Kelly
- David Patrick Kelly
- Carrie Keranen
- Keegan-Michael Key
- Richard Kiel
- Michael Kinsley
- Jana Kramer
- Neil LaBute
- Ray Lane
- Piper Laurie
- Misty Lee
- Joan Leslie
- Lashonda Lester
- James Lipton
- Brandi Love
- Loni Love
- Robert Mac
- Lee Majors
- Dick Martin
- Greg Mathis
- Karen McDougal
- Antoine McKay
- Ed McMahon
- Tim Meadows
- S. Epatha Merkerson
- Nicki Micheaux
- Ivana Miličević
- Martin Milner
- David Robert Mitchell
- Kenya Moore
- Naima Mora
- Harry Morgan
- Michael Moriarty
- Bob Murawski
- Tariq Nasheed
- Vincenzo Natali
- Denise Nicholas
- George Noory
- Rob Paulsen
- George Peppard
- Gilda Radner
- Sam Raimi
- Ted Raimi
- David Ramsey
- Joyce Randolph
- Amber Rayne
- Diona Reasonover
- Della Reese
- Gene Reynolds
- Sam Richardson
- Tim Robinson
- Fred Roggin
- Bruce Joel Rubin
- Michelle Ruff
- Roz Ryan
- Pat St. John
- Soupy Sales
- Chris Savino
- George C. Scott
- Tom Selleck
- Dax Shepard
- Serena Shim
- Sicily
- Stirling Silliphant
- J. K. Simmons
- Donnie Simpson
- Tom Sizemore
- Tom Skerritt
- Nick Sousanis
- David Spade
- Elaine Stritch
- Geoff Stults
- George Stults
- William Talman
- Danny Thomas
- Marlo Thomas
- Lily Tomlin
- Courtney B. Vance
- Jordan Vogt-Roberts
- Robert Wagner
- Cynthia Watros
- Peter Werbe
- Billy West
- Rachelle Wilkos
- Robin Williams
- John Witherspoon
- Max Wright
- H.M. Wynant
- Lucky Yates
- Steven Yeun

== Musicians, bands and composers ==
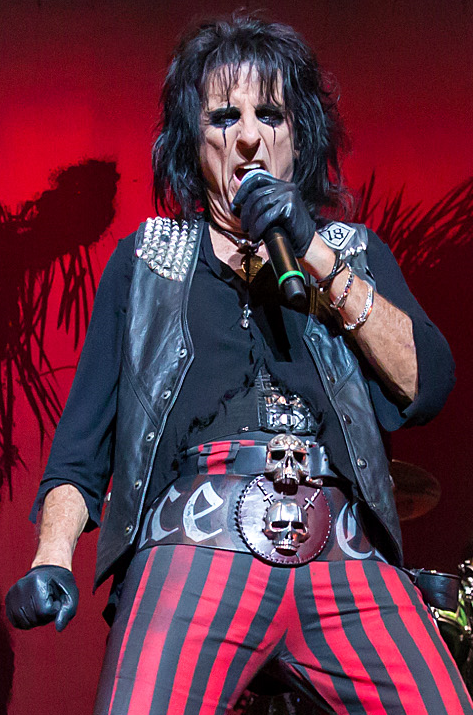
Alice Cooper

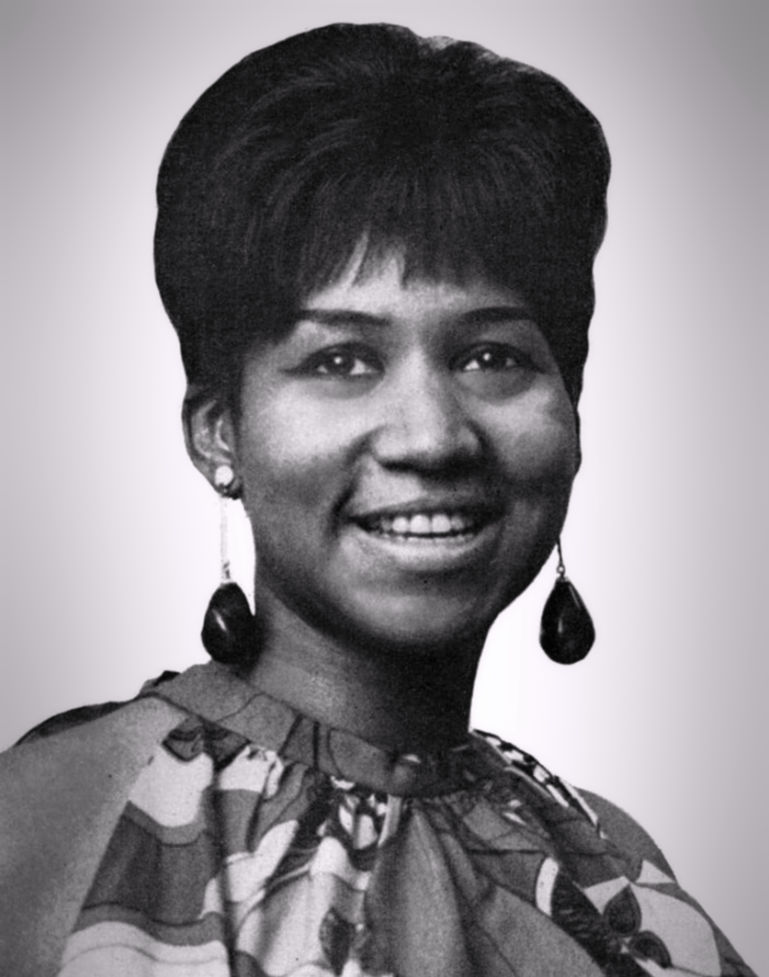
Aretha Franklin

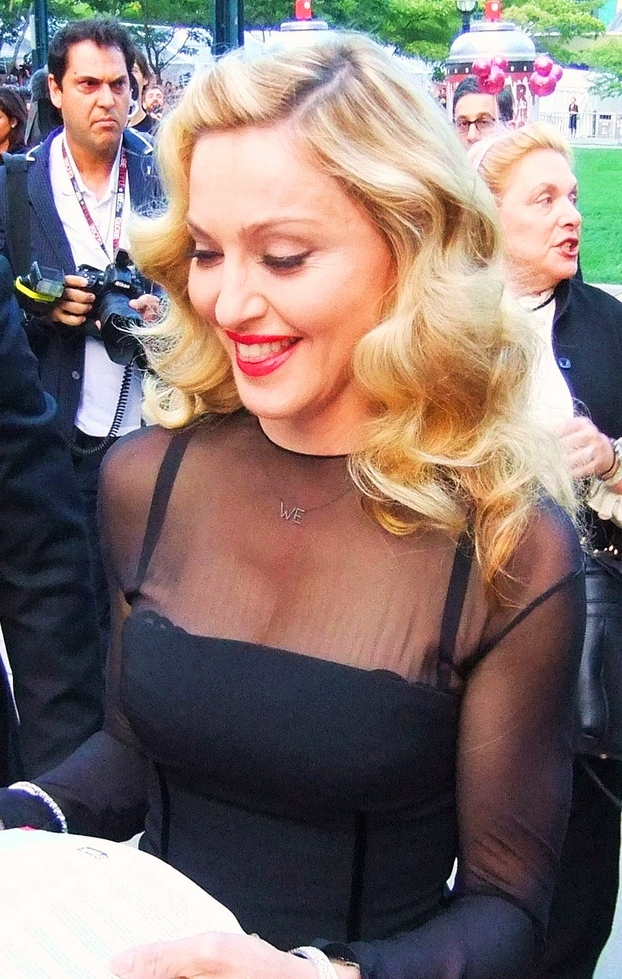
Madonna

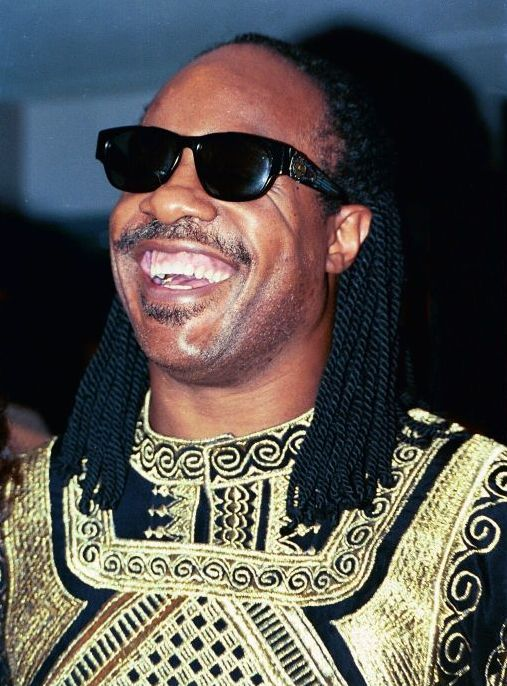
Stevie Wonder

- 2 Sins
- 42 Dugg
- Aaliyah
- Geri Allen
- Almighty Dreadnaughtz
- The Amboy Dukes
- Anybody Killa
- Dorothy Ashby
- Juan Atkins
- Bad Meets Evil
- Anita Baker
- Florence Ballard
- Hank Ballard
- Ortheia Barnes
- Max Bendix
- Theodore Bendix
- Brendan Benson
- Big Herk
- Big Sean
- Bizarre
- The Black Dahlia Murder
- Blaze Ya Dead Homie
- Bliss 66
- Blue Stahli
- Brainstorm
- Broadzilla
- Roy Brooks
- Danny Brown
- Kenny Burrell
- Donald Byrd
- Robert Byrne
- Carl Carlton
- Ron Carter
- Emilio Castillo
- Celldweller
- Cha Cha
- Champtown
- Cherrelle
- The Clark Sisters
- George Clinton
- Anita Cochran
- Alice Coltrane
- The Contours
- Alice Cooper
- Marshall Crenshaw
- D12
- Dark Lotus
- DeBarge
- Warren Defever
- Dej Loaf
- Ken Delo
- Johnny Desmond
- Destroy All Monsters
- The Detroit Cobras
- Marcella Detroit
- David DiChiera
- The Dirtbombs
- Vinnie Dombroski
- Lamont Dozier
- The Dramatics
- Dwele
- Dennis Edwards
- Jango Edwards
- Electric Six
- Eminem
- Enchantment
- Esham
- Maria Ewing
- Factory 81
- Abdul Fakir
- Henry Fambrough
- Fatt Father
- Shamari Fears
- Tommy Flanagan
- The Floaters
- Sean Forbes
- The Four Tops
- Aretha Franklin
- Erma Franklin
- Paul Franklin
- Glenn Frey
- Curtis Fuller
- The Funk Brothers
- Gallery
- Kenny Garrett
- Marvin Gaye
- Nicci Gilbert
- The Go
- King Gordy
- Gore Gore Girls
- The Gories
- Josh Gracin
- Troy Gregory
- Tee Grizzley
- Jeff Gutt
- Fred Hammond
- Roland Hanna
- The Hard Lessons
- Barry Harris
- Louis Hayes
- Joe Henderson
- Michael Henderson
- Dallas Hodge
- Cha Cha Hogan
- Brian Holland
- Edward Holland Jr.
- Major Holley
- House of Krazees
- Hush
- I Prevail
- I See Stars
- Insane Clown Posse
- J Dilla
- Milt Jackson
- Oliver Jackson
- Herb Jeffries
- JMSN
- Little Willie John
- Marv Johnson
- The Jones Girls
- JR JR
- Jumpsteady
- Ray Kamalay
- Kash Doll
- Kem
- Kid Rock
- Kina
- Nahru Lampkin
- Bettye LaVette
- Yusef Lateef
- Hugh Lawson
- Laura Lee
- Legz Diamond
- Lizzo
- Joseph LoDuca
- Lene Lovich
- Madonna
- Teairra Marí
- Martha and the Vandellas
- The Marvelettes
- Derrick May
- MC5
- Thema "Tayma Loren" McKinney
- Tomo Miličević
- Jeff Mills
- The Miracles
- Guy Mitchell
- Jack Montrose
- Moodymann
- Motown Rage
- Alicia Myers
- Negative Approach
- Ted Nugent
- Norman O'Connor
- Bobby Ogdin
- One Way
- The Originals
- Ray Parker Jr.
- Parliament-Funkadelic
- Theo Parrish
- Daniel Passino
- Freda Payne
- Scherrie Payne
- Lawrence Payton
- Peekaboo
- Dave Pike
- Terry Pollard
- Iggy Pop
- Porcelain Black
- Mike Posner
- Proof
- Psychopathic Rydas
- Mike Quatro
- Suzi Quatro
- The Raconteurs
- Rare Earth
- Martha Reeves
- Karriem Riggins
- Robert Bradley's Blackwater Surprise
- Smokey Robinson
- Rockwell
- Sixto Rodriguez
- The Romantics
- Rosetta Pebble
- Frank Rosolino
- Diana Ross
- Royce Da 5'9"
- Rucka Rucka Ali
- Mitch Ryder
- Kevin Saunderson
- Search the City
- Bob Seger
- James Royce Shannon
- Slum Village
- Chad Smith
- Brian Southall
- JD Souther
- The Spinners
- Sponge
- Edwin Starr
- Sufjan Stevens
- Jason Stollsteimer
- Levi Stubbs
- The Suicide Machines
- The Supremes
- Tally Hall
- The Temptations
- Mark Tremonti
- Obie Trice
- Trick-Trick
- Twiztid
- Uncle Kracker
- The Von Bondies
- Leon Ware
- Don Was
- Dinah Washington
- Keith Washington
- We Came as Romans
- Mary Wells
- Kim Weston
- Jack White
- The White Stripes
- Margaret Whiting
- Brandi Williams
- Jackie Wilson
- Joyce Vincent Wilson
- Mary Wilson
- The Winans family
- Marv Won
- Stevie Wonder
- Belita Woods
- Ali-Ollie Woodson
- Xzibit
- Val Young
- Sherry Zannoth

== Sports figures ==
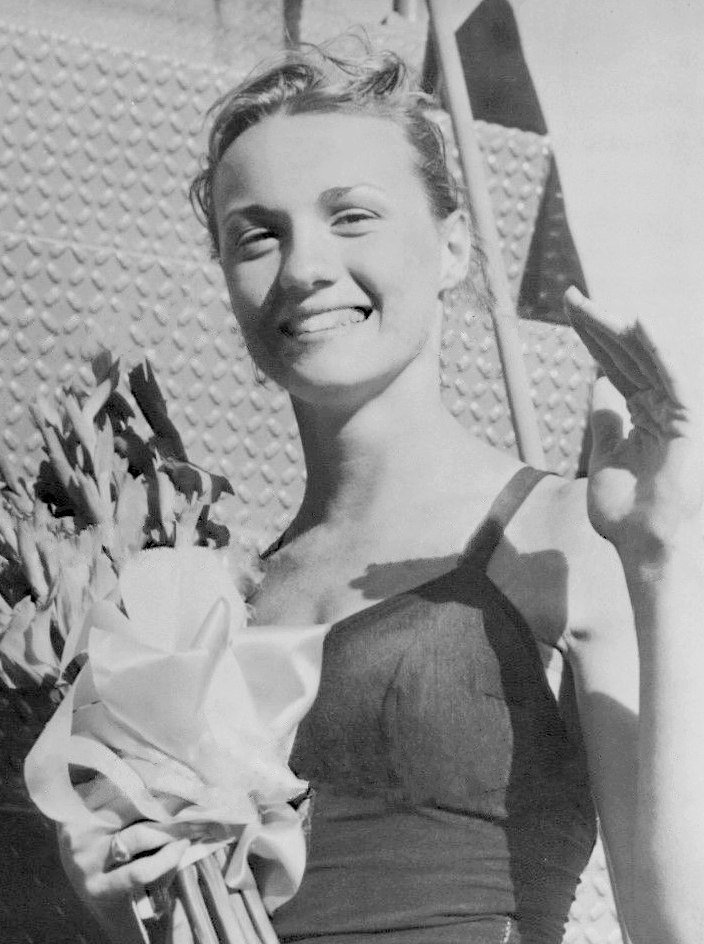
Barbara Gilders

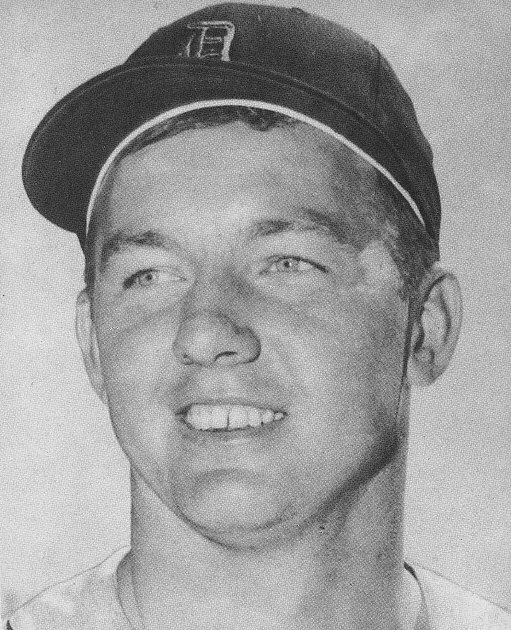
Al Kaline

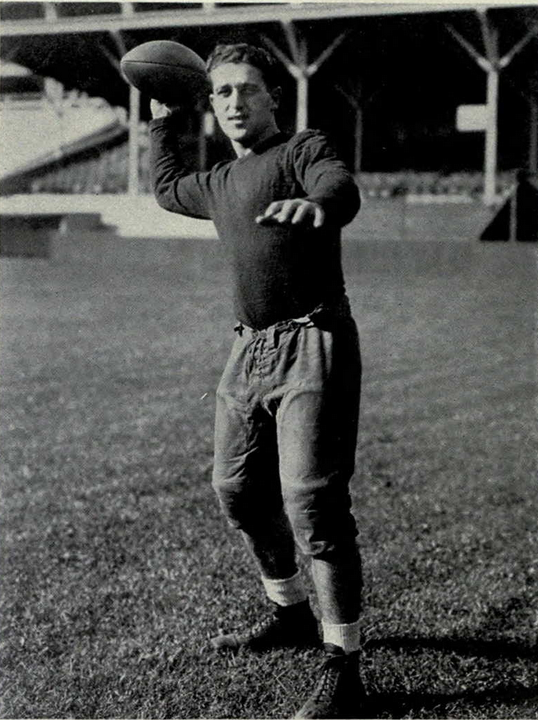
Harry Newman

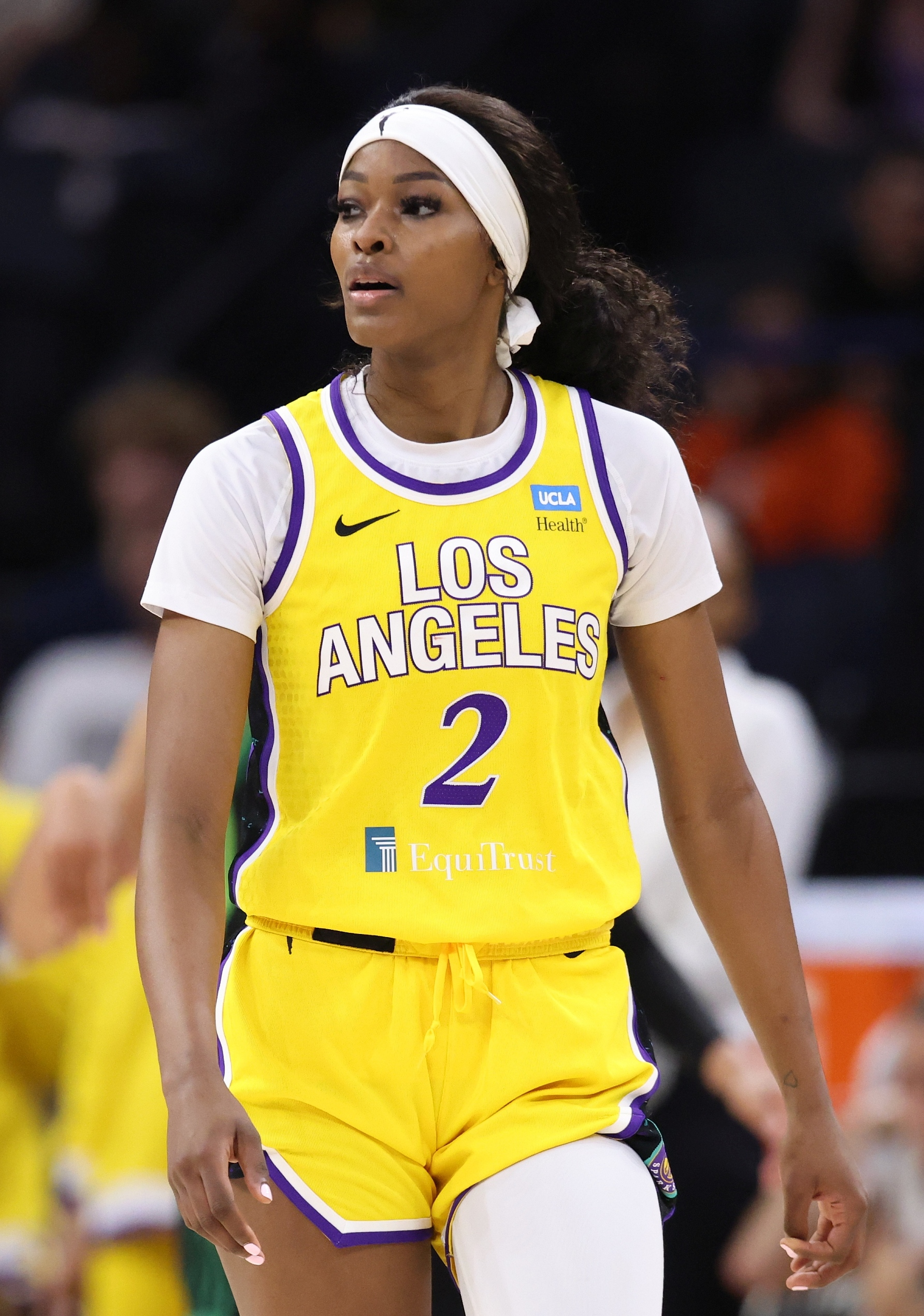
Rickea Jackson

=== American football ===
- Anthony Adams
- Erik Affholter
- Fred Arbanas
- Alan Ball
- Willie Beavers
- Kevin Belcher
- Walter Bender
- Jerome Bettis
- Earl Blaik
- Kevin Brooks
- Gilbert Brown
- Rick Byas
- Walt Clago
- Dan Currie
- Gary Danielson
- Joe DeLamielleure
- Bob Dozier
- Braylon Edwards
- Stan Edwards
- Bump Elliott
- Tony F. Elliott
- Phil Emery
- Larry Fitzpatrick
- Willie "The Wisp" Fleming
- Larry Foote
- Ed Frutig
- Devin Funchess
- Devin Gardner
- Sauce Gardner
- Antonio Gates
- Vernon Gholston
- William Gholston
- Jerry Glanville
- Kevin Glenn
- Brandon Graham
- Chris Greenwood
- Bobby Grier
- Ruffin Hamilton
- K. J. Hamler
- Aaron Hayden
- Matt Hernandez
- Derek Hill
- Lano Hill
- Lavert Hill
- Pepper Johnson
- Matthew Judon
- Desmond King
- Jason Lamar
- T. J. Lang
- Jourdan Lewis
- Tony Lippett
- Mike Martin
- Greg Marx
- Derrick Mason
- Norm Masters
- Malik McDowell
- Ray McLean
- Lou Mihajlovich
- Harry Newman
- Michael Ojemudia
- Donovan Peoples-Jones
- Nick Perry
- Ron Pitts
- Ron Rice
- Allen Robinson
- Paul Rudzinski
- Robert Saleh
- Bart Scott
- Paul Seymour
- Dion Sims
- Dwight Smith
- Ambry Thomas
- Milt Trost
- Chance Warmack
- Mike Weber
- Norm Wells
- Michael Westbrook

=== Baseball ===
- Ryan Anderson
- Anthony Bass
- Augie Bergamo
- Hunter Brown
- Arlene Buszka
- Danny Fife
- Bill Freehan
- Paul Fry
- Chris Getz
- Kirk Gibson
- Eric Haase
- Harry Heilmann
- Pat Hentgen
- Willie Horton
- Art Houtteman
- Al Kaline
- Dolores Klosowski
- Ryan LaMarre
- Charley Lau
- Ron LeFlore
- DJ LeMahieu
- Stan Lopata
- Derek Lowe
- John Mayberry
- Bob Miller
- Anthony Misiewicz
- Mary Ann Moore
- Hal Newhouser
- Milt Pappas
- Billy Pierce
- Nick Plummer
- J. J. Putz
- Ed Reulbach
- Mary Rini
- Chris Sabo
- John Schreiber
- Matt Shoemaker
- Ted Simmons
- John Smoltz
- Frank Tanana
- Ron Teasley
- Jason Varitek
- Margaret Wenzell
- Connie Wisniewski
- Tom Yawkey

=== Basketball ===
- Maurice Ager
- Bacari Alexander
- Keith Appling
- B. J. Armstrong
- Jamie Arnold
- Sam Balter
- Shane Battier
- Dave Bing
- Mark Brisker
- P. J. Brown
- Bill Buntin
- Kris Clyburn
- Will Clyburn
- Derrick Coleman
- Jordan Crawford
- Earl Cureton
- Mel Daniels
- Dave DeBusschere
- David DeJulius
- Chris Douglas-Roberts
- Terry Duerod
- Howard Eisley
- Kay Felder
- Dane Fife
- Marcus Fizer
- Derrick Gervin
- George Gervin
- Willie Green
- Malik Hairston
- Reggie Harding
- Jaden Hardy
- Manny Harris
- Spencer Haywood
- Jermaine Jackson
- Josh Jackson
- Rickea Jackson
- Greg Kelser
- Voshon Lenard
- Grant Long
- John Long
- Kalin Lucas
- Tim McCormick
- Terry Mills
- Eric Money
- Jordan Morgan
- Rob Murphy
- Derrick Nix
- Scott Perry
- Rashad Phillips
- Tajuan Porter
- Aerial Powers
- Shawn Respert
- Jalen Reynolds
- Ryan Rollins
- Jalen Rose
- Chase Simon
- Steve Smith
- Durrell Summers
- Edmond Sumner
- Roy Tarpley
- Maurice Taylor
- Rudy Tomjanovich
- Robert Traylor
- Terry Tyler
- Derrick Walton
- Gary Waters
- Terrence Watson
- Rocket Watts
- Chris Webber
- Romeo Weems
- Kevin Willis
- Cassius Winston

=== Bodybuilding ===
- Lenda Murray

=== Boxing ===
- Johnathon Banks
- Eddie Futch
- Mickey Goodwin
- Thomas Hearns
- Jackie Kallen
- Hilmer Kenty
- Joe Louis
- Milton McCrory
- Steve McCrory
- Jimmy Paul
- Sugar Ray Robinson
- Mary Jo Sanders
- Emanuel Steward

=== Fencing ===
- Byron Krieger

=== Frisbee ===
- Ken Westerfield

=== Golf ===
- Donna Caponi
- Calvin Peete

=== Hockey ===
- Sid Abel
- Jeff Blashill
- David Booth
- Adam Burt
- Jimmy Carson
- Shawn Chambers
- Kyle Connor
- Alex DeBrincat
- Danny DeKeyser
- Alex Delvecchio
- Cam Fowler
- Nathan Gerbe
- Tim Gleason
- Andy Greene
- Mike Grier
- Elle Hartje
- Mike Hartman
- Derian Hatcher
- Kevin Hatcher
- Connor Hellebuyck
- Gordie Howe
- Mark Howe
- Marty Howe
- Al Iafrate
- Max Jones
- Megan Keller
- Ryan Kesler
- Vladimir Konstantinov
- Torey Krug
- Pat LaFontaine
- Dylan Larkin
- David Legwand
- Nicklas Lidström
- Ted Lindsay
- Cooper Marody
- Alec Martinez
- Mike Modano
- David Moss
- Josh Norris
- Chris Osgood
- Pat Peake
- Jeff Petry
- Kevin Porter
- Brian Rafalski
- Erik Reitz
- Gordie Roberts
- Bryan Rust
- Gordon Tottle
- John Vanbiesbrouck
- Don Waddell
- Doug Weight
- Zach Werenski
- James Wisniewski
- Mike York
- Steve Yzerman

=== Mixed martial arts ===
- Daron Cruickshank
- Kevin Lee

=== Motorsports ===
- Bob Keselowski
- Brad Keselowski
- Brian Keselowski
- Ron Keselowski
- Gordon Mineo
- Benny Parsons
- Phil Parsons

=== Olympians ===
- Pat Costello
- Jim Gardiner
- James McIntosh
- Art McKinlay
- John McKinlay
- John Welchli

=== Professional wrestling ===
- Eric Bischoff
- Bruiser Brody
- Terry "Sabu" Brunk
- D-Ray 3000
- Danhausen
- Excalibur
- Terry "Rhino" Gerin
- Allysin Kay
- Mighty Igor
- Kevin Nash
- Brandi Rhodes
- Bert Ruby
- Chris Sabin
- The Sheik
- Alex Shelley
- Sgt. Slaughter
- George Steele
- Robert Teet

=== Soccer ===
- Ayo Akinola
- Dylan Borczak
- Marcelle Bruce
- Mark Christensen
- Cobi Jones
- Alexi Lalas
- Kate Markgraf

=== Swimming and diving ===
- Barbara Gilders
- Fletcher Gilders

=== Tennis ===
- Michael Russell

=== Track and field ===
- Avery Brundage
- Henry Carr
- Marshall Dill
- Ken Doherty
- Guy Murray
- Allen Tolmich
- Delisa Walton-Floyd
- Quincy Watts
- Lorenzo Wright

== Writers, novelists and poets ==
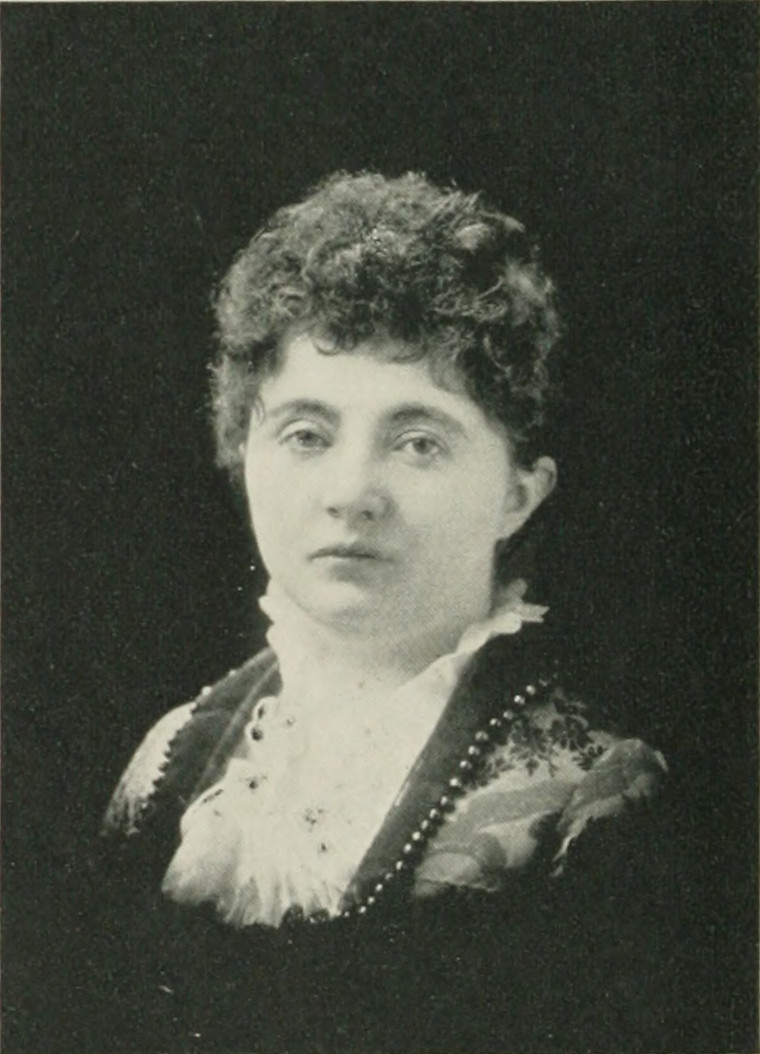
Alice Emma Ives

- Mitch Albom
- Nelson Algren
- Ron Allen
- Harriette Arnow
- Mathis Bailey
- Alice Elinor Bartlett
- Jack Berry
- E. Jean Carroll
- Jeremiah Curtin
- Christopher Paul Curtis
- Charles Dickinson
- Jeffrey Eugenides
- Donald Goines
- Edgar Guest
- Judith Guest
- Carla Harryman
- Robert Hayden
- Royce Howes
- Alice Emma Ives
- Geoff Johns
- William Kienzle
- Tim LaHaye
- Helen Landgarten
- Elmore Leonard
- Philip Levine
- Thomas Ligotti
- Thomas Lynch
- Robert Lyons
- Dwayne McDuffie
- Ron Milner
- James O'Barr
- Joyce Carol Oates
- Daniel Okrent
- Marge Piercy
- Alice Randall
- Dudley Randall
- John Sinclair
- Jim Starlin
- Ebony Elizabeth Thomas
- Paul Vachon
- Barrett Watten
- Michael Zadoorian
- Helen Zia

== Others ==
- Club Chalamet, social media personality

== See also ==
- List of people from Michigan

== References and further reading ==
- Gavrilovich, Peter & Bill McGraw (2000). The Detroit Almanac. Detroit Free Press. ISBN 0-937247-34-0.
- Gavrilovich, Peter & Bill McGraw (2006). The Detroit Almanac, 2nd edition. Detroit Free Press. ISBN 978-0-937247-48-8.
- Hendricks, Dave (August 15, 2008). "Hidalgo County leads state in jobless rate, job growth | leads, county, rate – Now". TheMonitor.com.
- Hill, Eric J. & John Gallagher (2002). AIA Detroit: The American Institute of Architects Guide to Detroit Architecture. Wayne State University Press. ISBN 0-8143-3120-3.
- Meyer, Katherine Mattingly; Martin C.P. McElroy (1980). Detroit Architecture A.I.A. Guide Revised Edition. Introduction by W. Hawkins Ferry, Hon A.I.A. Wayne State University Press. ISBN 0-8143-1651-4.
- Poremba, David Lee (2003). Detroit: A Motor City History. Arcadia Publishing. ISBN 0-7385-2435-2.
- McFeely, William S. (1974). Woodward, C. Vann (ed.). Responses of the Presidents to Charges of Misconduct. New York, New York: Delacorte Press. ISBN 0-440-05923-2.
