= Lampkin =

Origin
- Region of origin: England

Lampkin is an English surname.

== Notable persons with this surname ==
- Arthur Lampkin (born circa 1938), English former professional motorcycle racer
- Cam Lampkin (born 2001), American football player
- Charles Lampkin (1913–1989), American actor, musician and lecturer
- Chrissy Lampkin, participant of an American reality television series Love & Hip Hop
- Daisy Elizabeth Adams Lampkin (1883–1965), American suffragette
- Dougie Lampkin (born 1976), English motorcycle trials rider
- Jeff Lampkin (born 1959), American former professional boxer
- Kevin Lampkin (born 1972), English former professional footballer
- Martin Lampkin (1950–2016), English former professional motorcycle competitor
- Nahru Lampkin (born 1962), American entertainer, musician, street performer, entrepreneur
- Ray Lampkin (born 1948), American former professional boxer
- Sheilla Lampkin (1945–2016), American politician
- Tom Lampkin (born 1964), American baseball player
- Willie Lampkin (born 2002), American football player

== Others ==
- Romo Lampkin, a fictional character in the television remake of Battlestar Galactica

== See also ==
- Lumpkin (disambiguation)
