= Alvin Brooks =

Alvin Brooks may refer to:

- Alvin Brooks (basketball, born 1959), American basketball coach
- Alvin Brooks III (born 1979), his son, American basketball coach
- Alvin Brooks (activist), American civil rights activist, community leader, and retired police officer
