= Lumpkin =

Lumpkin may refer to:

== Places in the United States ==
- Lumpkin, California
- Lumpkin, Georgia
- Lumpkin County, Georgia

== People with the surname ==
- Justice Lumpkin (disambiguation), any of several American judges named Lumpkin
- Alva M. Lumpkin (1886–1941), a U.S. Senator from South Carolina
- Beatrice Lumpkin (1918–2026), American union organizer, activist, and writer
- Elgin Lumpkin (born 1970) American singer-songwriter, a.k.a. Ginuwine
- Ellen Lumpkin, American neuroscientist
- Grace Lumpkin (1892–1980), anti-communist author (sister of Katharine)
- John Henry Lumpkin, a U.S. Representative from Georgia, nephew of Joseph Henry Lumpkin and Wilson Lumpkin
- Johnny Lumpkin (born 1997), American football player
- Joseph Henry Lumpkin (1799–1867), the first chief justice of the state of Georgia, brother of Wilson Lumpkin
- Katharine DuPre Lumpkin (1897–1988), American writer (sister of Grace)
- Kregg Lumpkin, American football running back
- Michael D. Lumpkin, Senior Advisor to the Secretary of Veterans Affairs
- Phil Lumpkin (1951–2009), American basketball player and coach
- Ricky Lumpkin (born 1988), American football player
- Robert Lumpkin (1805–1866), Slave trader
- Theodore Lumpkin (1919–2020), American Tuskegee airman
- Wilson Lumpkin (1783–1870), a governor of and U.S. Senator from Georgia, brother of Joseph Henry Lumpkin

== Fiction ==
- Fatty Lumpkin, a pony in J. R. R. Tolkien's The Lord of the Rings
- Fuzzy Lumpkins, a furry pink hillbilly monster in The Powerpuff Girls
- Lurleen Lumpkin, fictional character from The Simpsons
- Tony Lumpkin, fictional character from She Stoops to Conquer
- Willie Lumpkin, fictional comic character

== Other uses ==
- Americus, Preston and Lumpkin Railroad, a former Railway in the U.S. state of Georgia

== See also ==
- Lumpkins, a surname
