= Bob Dozier =

American football player and coach (born 1946)

Biographical details
- Born: 1946 (age 79–80)
- Education: Olivet College (1968)

Playing career

Football
- ?–1967: Olivet

Track
- ?–?: Olivet

Coaching career (HC unless noted)

Football
- 1969–2002: Mackenzie HS (MI)

Accomplishments and honors

Awards
- Michigan High School Football Coaches Association Hall of Fame (1993); Olivet College Athletic Hall of Fame (2003)

Robert Dozier (born 1946) is a 1993 inductee to the Michigan High School Football Coaches Association Hall of Fame; he was a highly successful educator and football coach at Detroit's Mackenzie High School. Dozier's thirty-three year career spanned five decades (1969–2002). Seven of Bob Dozier's athletes would eventually take their talents to the National Football League; three of those players performed on Super Bowl Championship teams. Toward the conclusion of his career at Mackenzie, Dozier served as the school's Athletic Director. In 2003, Robert Dozier was inducted into the Olivet College Athletic Hall of Fame.

== Early years ==
Dozier is a Detroit native and 1964 graduate of Cass Technical High School. Dozier left Detroit during the fall of 1964 to attend Olivet College in south central Michigan; Dozier was an All-MIAA football player and javelin thrower for the Comets of Olivet. Upon earning a bachelor's degree in 1968, Dozier returned to Detroit.

== Right man for the job: Mackenzie High School ==
In the summer of 1969 Robert Dozier accepted an offer from the Detroit Board of Education to teach and coach at Mackenzie. Throughout the late 1960s, the school and surrounding neighborhoods faced difficulties accommodating a rapid transition to a predominantly African-American population; the Board saw Dozier as the right man for the challenge of building peace and restoring order.

In his early years of coaching football at Mackenzie, Robert Dozier teamed with former Wayne State University Hall of Fame running back, Elbert Richmond. During the teacher strike-shortened 1967 season, Richmond's Mackenzie football team went 5-0; his defensive squad yielded only two points. One of Richmond's defensive backs, Richard Byas Jr., went on to a rewarding career with the Atlanta Falcons of the NFL. During the next ten seasons, from 1969 to 1978, the coaching tandem of Elbert Richmond and Robert Dozier would compile an impressive record of 63-20 (.759%); including an undefeated season in 1969. From the very start of his career, Robert Dozier instilled school pride and a positive attitude among Mackenzie students, athletes, and faculty members. Bob Dozier's most noteworthy accomplishments began to take shape during the 1980s.

== Mentor of future professionals ==
The first of Dozier's football players to reach the National Football League was Kevin Brooks, who graduated from Mackenzie in 1981. Prior to his professional career, Brooks played collegiately for the University of Michigan. Kevin Brooks went on to play six seasons in the NFL, with the Dallas Cowboys and Detroit Lions. In 1982, the second of Dozier's future professionals - Thomas Pepper Johnson - graduated from Mackenzie before moving on to the Ohio State University. Incredibly, Pepper Johnson would eventually earn a total of five Super Bowl Championship rings; two as a player with the New York Giants, and three more as a defensive coach with the 2001, 2003, and 2004 Super Bowl Champion New England Patriots.

Five seasons passed before Dozier's next future NFL player - Reggie Thornton - graduated from Mackenzie. Thornton played college football at Bowling Green State University prior to a brief career in the NFL, with Indianapolis (1991) and Cincinnati (1993). Dozier's next future-professional was Gilbert Brown, who graduated from Mackenzie in 1989. Brown played college football for the University of Kansas - he was drafted by the Minnesota Vikings in 1993. Gilbert Brown ended up with a starting position on the Green Bay Packers where he earned a Super Bowl Championship ring in 1996. Sylvester Wright, who graduated from Mackenzie in 1989, became the fifth of Coach Dozier's players to perform at the professional level. Following a collegiate football career at the University of Kansas, Wright played two seasons with the Philadelphia Eagles in 1995 and 1996.

The last of Robert Dozier's former athletes to play professional football was Jerome Bettis, who graduated from Mackenzie in 1990. Bettis played college ball at Notre Dame before starting a professional career with the Los Angeles Rams; in Los Angeles, Bettis was voted 1993 NFL Offensive Rookie of the Year. After three seasons with the Rams, Bettis was traded to the Pittsburgh Steelers. Jerome Bettis played ten years with Pittsburgh; including the 2005-06 Super Bowl Championship season during which he was victorious in his final professional game.
