= DePrice Taylor =

American community relations executive

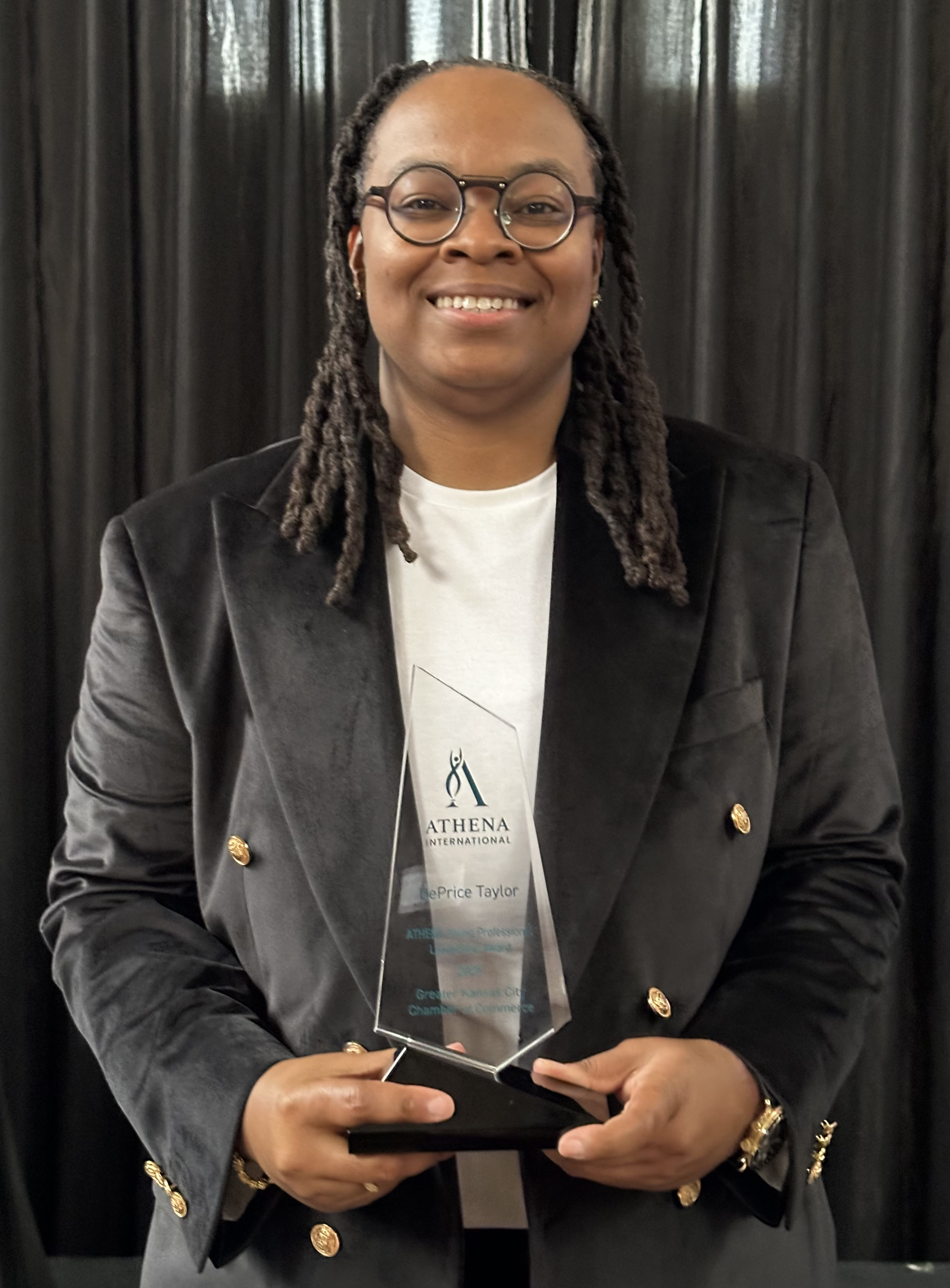
- Taylor received the ATHENA Young Professional Leadership Award in 2025.
- Born: Detroit, Michigan, U.S.
- Occupations: Community relations executive, civic leader
- Employer: Kansas City Current
- Known for: Community development and youth sports advocacy

DePrice Taylor is an American community relations executive and civic leader in Kansas City, Missouri. She is the executive director of Community Relations for the Kansas City Current, a professional team in the National Women's Soccer League, and is a commissioner on the Kansas City Board of Parks and Recreation. She was born and raised in Detroit, Michigan, and her career focuses on youth development with a background in social work. She received the 2025 ATHENA Young Professional Leadership Award, presented locally by the Greater Kansas City Chamber of Commerce, which recognizes women for professional excellence and community service.

== Early life and education ==
Taylor was born and raised in Detroit, Michigan, while it was rated "the second most dangerous city in the country", and which she calls "the city of the flyest, most player people to ever live". She described sports as a "safe haven" during her youth, and her grandmother was a significant influence who instilled the value of community service. Taylor became the first in her family to attend college.

Taylor earned a Division I basketball scholarship to Bowling Green State University but lost it due to her attitude and environment at age 17. She said, "My life has really been possible because of the power of second chances". After transferring to Barton Community College, she followed her coach Lane Lord to Pittsburg State University, where she resolved to take advantage of the opportunity. She earned a Bachelor of Science in Social Work in 2010 and a Master of Science in Health, Human Performance, and Recreation in 2012 from Pittsburg State.

== Career ==
Taylor's career has focused on youth development and community engagement. She is an alumna of the Chamber's Centurions Leadership Program and serves on the boards of the Win for KC Advisory Board, Black Excellence KC, and the Pittsburg State Alumni Association. She has described her professional goal of returning to the community the confidence that role models gave her, noting that she struggled as a youth to develop her own vulnerable and unique personality through adversity. Startland News summarized that she "plays with an open hand".

By 2016, she was the area director for the Boys & Girls Clubs of Greater Kansas City. She was then the director of community engagement for Kanbe's Markets, a non-profit dedicated to eliminating food deserts in Kansas City. She is a commissioner on the Kansas City Board of Parks and Recreation, appointed by Mayor Quinton Lucas.

Taylor joined the Kansas City Current as director of community relations in early 2022 and was promoted to executive director of community relations by 2023. She leads the team's collaboration with community organizations, including the Boys & Girls Clubs, Big Brothers Big Sisters Kansas City, and Girls on the Run. She leads initiatives such as a program to build mini-soccer pitches in underserved neighborhoods in partnership with the U.S. Soccer Foundation. She named Kobe Bryant as her favorite basketball player, endorsing his quote: "Everything negative—the challenges, the pressure—is an opportunity to rise."

== Reception ==
Taylor's work has been recognized with several honors. In 2023, she was named a NextGen Leader by the Kansas City Business Journal, a Community Builder to Watch by Startland News, and received the Dr. Kenneth K. Bateman Outstanding Alumni Award from Pittsburg State University. In 2024, the Heartland Black Chamber of Commerce named her its MVP. In March 2024, KCTV featured her in its Impactful Women of KC series. She received the 2025 ATHENA Young Professional Leadership Award, presented locally by the Greater Kansas City Chamber of Commerce, which recognizes women for professional excellence and community service.

== See also ==
- Alvin Brooks, KC activist and founder of the Ad Hoc Group Against Crime
- Jessie Jefferson, KC community organizer and neighborhood advocate
- Samuel U. Rodgers, physician and founder of the Samuel U. Rodgers Health Center
