= Diane Dudeck =

Personal information
- Born: 1963 (age 62–63) Detroit, Michigan, United States

Sport
- Sport: Diving

Diane Dudeck (born 1963) is a former National Open Champion and three-time National Collegiate Athletic Association All-American springboard diver.

Dudeck first rose to national prominence as the one-meter springboard gold medalist at the 1981 U.S. Indoor Diving Championships. Three years later, while competing for the University of Michigan, Diane was named Big Ten Conference Diver of the Year for her first-place performance on the one-meter board. Later that season, Dudeck earned a spot in the finals at the National Collegiate Championships; for her efforts, Diane was selected to the 1984 NCAA All-American Team. In April 1984, Dudeck was runner-up on the one-meter board at the U.S. indoor championships; Diane was also a three-meter finalist at the 1984 US Olympic Trials.

At the 1986 NCAA Championships, at which she competed for the University of Arkansas, Dudeck was the one-meter silver medalist; she was also a finalist on the three-meter board - resulting in a double berth to the 1986 All-American Team.

== Noteworthy ==
Diane Dudeck is the daughter of former Olympic springboard diver, Barbara Sue Gilders. As a 19-year-old Detroit-Mackenzie High School graduate, Miss Gilders represented the United States in the finals of the three-meter event at the 1956 Summer Olympics in Melbourne, Australia.

Diane's father, John Dudeck, was an accomplished athlete. A product of Detroit's Western High School, Dudeck swam at the collegiate level for Michigan State University. A former Big Ten Conference record holder and two-time Big Ten titlist in the 100-yard breaststroke (1953, 54); Dudeck was a nine-time All-American for the Spartans (1953–55).
