= Lollar (surname) =

Lollar is a surname. Notable people with the surname include:

- Barbara Sherwood Lollar (born 1963), Canadian geologist
- Charles Lollar (born 1971), American businessman and politician
- Phil Lollar (born 1959), American voice actor and producer
- Ron Lollar (born 1948–2018), American politician
- Sherm Lollar (1924–1977), American baseball player
- Slick Lollar (1905–1945), American football player
- Tim Lollar (born 1956), American baseball player
- Tom Lollar (born 1951), American ceramist
