= Miller, Canfield, Paddock and Stone =

American law firm

- Headquarters: Detroit, Michigan; United States
- No. of offices: 19 offices total (8 international)
- No. of attorneys: Approximately 300
- Major practice areas: General Practice
- Key people: A. Michael Palizzi, CEO
- Date founded: 1852; 170+ years ago
- Founder: Sidney Davy Miller
- Company type: Professional Limited Liability Company
- Website: www.millercanfield.com

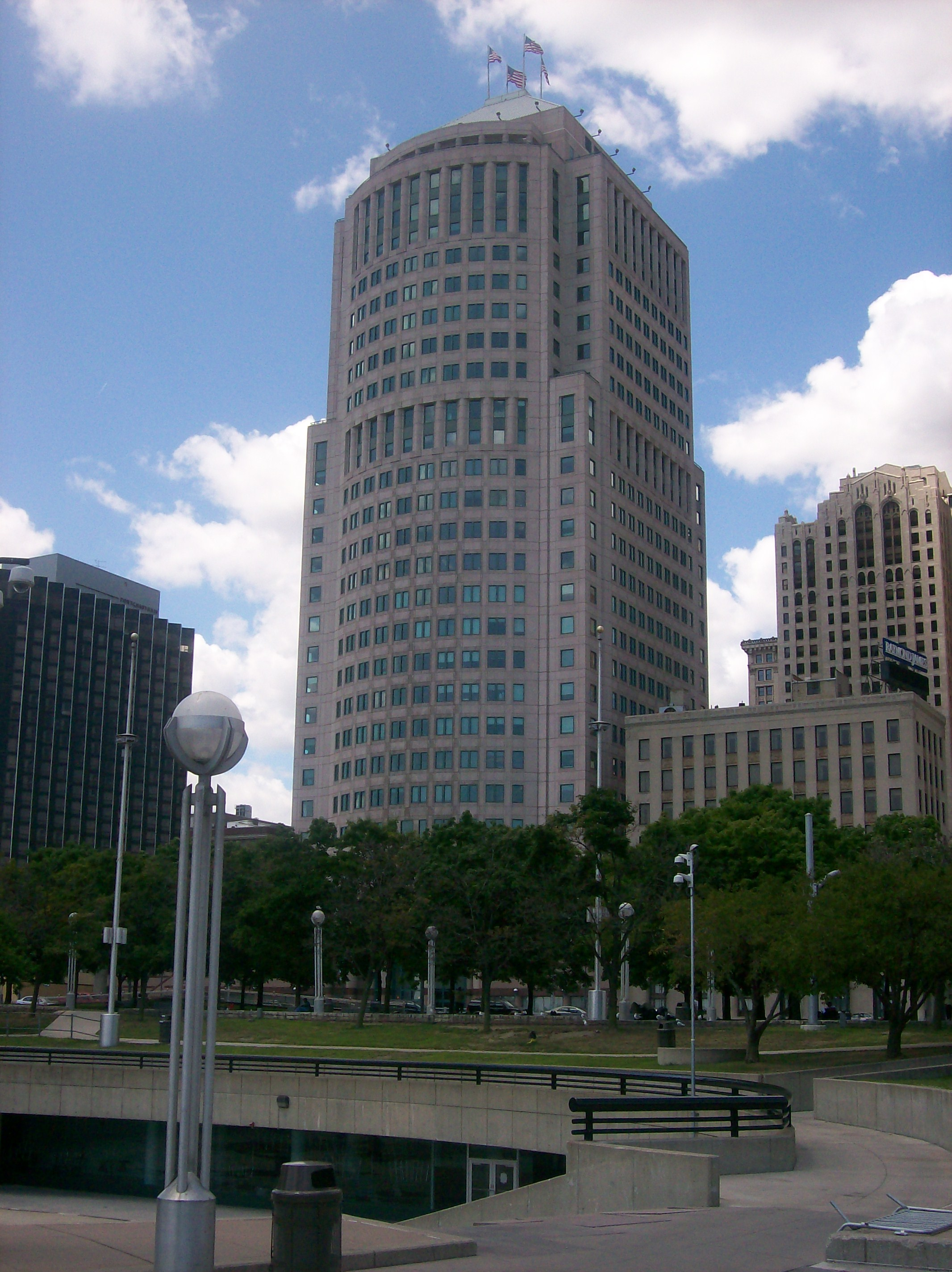
The law firm occupies space in 150 West Jefferson, Detroit.

Miller Canfield, P.L.C., doing business as Miller, Canfield, Paddock and Stone (founded in 1852), is an American law firm based in Detroit, Michigan. In 2014, the firm was ranked 165th largest in the United States in terms of attorney headcount by the National Law Journal. It is an international firm with offices and affiliated locations in the United States, Canada, Mexico, Poland, Qatar, and Ukraine.

Miller Canfield's headquarters is located at 150 West Jefferson in Downtown Detroit.

In 2022, Miller Canfield expanded to Ukraine and established an affiliation with Kyiv-based Dictio Law Firm.

== Notable lawyers and alumni ==
- Spencer Abraham - former United States Senator and former United States Secretary of Energy
- Ella Bully-Cummings - first female Chief of Police for the City of Detroit
- Eddie Francis - former Mayor of Windsor, Ontario
- Saul Green - Deputy Mayor of Detroit and former US Attorney for the Eastern District of Michigan
- Matthew Frederick Leitman - Judge, United States District Court for the Eastern District of Michigan
- Stephen Markman - former Michigan Supreme Court Justice
- Jay B. Rising - former Michigan State Treasurer
- Gerald Ellis Rosen - Judge, United States District Court for the Eastern District of Michigan
- Clifford Taylor - former Chief Justice, Michigan Supreme Court
