= Reggie Thornton =

American football player (born 1967)

No. 86, 83
- Position: Wide receiver

Personal information
- Born: September 26, 1967 (age 59); Detroit, Michigan, U.S.
- Listed height: 5 ft 10 in (1.78 m)
- Listed weight: 170 lb (77 kg)

Career information
- High school: Mackenzie (Detroit)
- College: Bowling Green
- NFL draft: 1990: 5th round, 116th overall pick

Career history
- Minnesota Vikings (1990)*; Atlanta Falcons (1990); Indianapolis Colts (1990–1991); Cincinnati Bengals (1993)
- * Offseason or practice squad member only

Career NFL statistics
- Receptions: 1
- Receiving yards: 38
- Stats at Pro Football Reference

Reginald Orlando Thornton (born September 26, 1967) is an American former professional football player who was a wide receiver in the National Football League (NFL). He played college football for the Bowling Green Falcons and was selected by the Minnesota Vikings in the fifth round of the 1990 NFL draft with the 116th overall pick. He played for the Indianapolis Colts in 1991 and the Cincinnati Bengals in 1993.
