= Saul Green =

American lawyer

Saul Green is the former deputy mayor of Detroit, Michigan. He was appointed the position by former mayor, Ken Cockrel, Jr. and was retained as deputy mayor by the next mayor, Dave Bing. Green is an attorney who oversaw both the Detroit Police and Law Department.

A Detroit native and 1965 graduate of Mackenzie High School, Green later graduated from the University of Michigan as well as from its law school. He served as US Attorney for the Eastern District of Michigan (1994–2001). Green served as an attorney for the Detroit firm of Miller, Canfield, Paddock & Stone.
