= Claude Marin de la Perrière =

Canadian fur trader, born in 1705

Claude Marin de la Perrière (1705 – before September 28, 1752) was a Canadian fur trader.

The son of Charles-Paul Marin de la Malgue and Louise Lamy, he was baptized in Montreal. Marin de La Perrière was involved in the fur trade by 1727. In 1733, he was based at a post near the mouth of the Nipigon River. From 1738 to 1741, he was operating at the Michipicoten, Ontario trading post in partnership with his cousin Louis-Césaire Dagneau Douville de Quindre. In 1737, he married Marie-Madeleine Regnard Duplessis, the daughter of Nicolas Antoine Coulon de Villiers. In 1741, Marin de la Perrière and de Quindre moved their operations to Fort St. Joseph. In 1747, they relocated to Michilimackinac; de Quindre moved to Detroit two years later.

Marin de la Perrière died in the middle of 1752.
