= 150 West Jefferson =

Skyscraper in Detroit

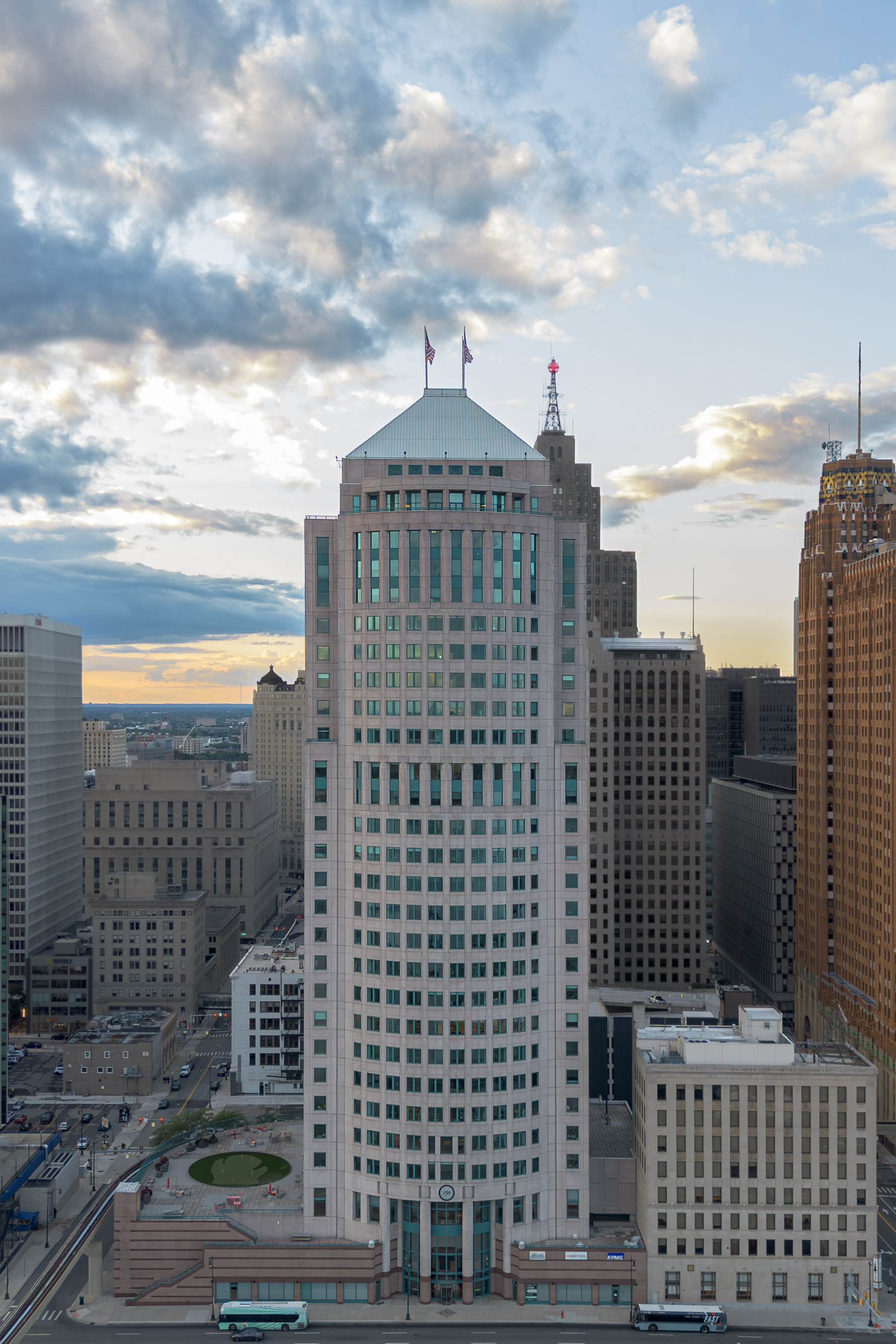
- 150 West Jefferson in 2025
- Interactive map of the 150 West Jefferson area

General information
- Type: Office
- Location: 150 West Jefferson Avenue; Detroit, Michigan
- Coordinates: 42.3286°N 83.0446°W
- Construction started: 1987
- Completed: 1989
- Owner: REDICO

Height
- Antenna spire: 147.7 m (485 ft)
- Roof: 138.8 m (455 ft)
- Top floor: 121 m (397 ft)

Technical details
- Floor count: 26
- Floor area: 505,409 sq ft (46,954.0 m^{2})

Design and construction
- Architects: Heller Manus Architects, BEI Associates

Other information
- Public transit: Financial District; Congress Street; DDOT 3, 5, 6, 9, 40, 52, 67; SMART FAST Michigan 261, Woodward 461, 462, Gratiot 561

150 West Jefferson (formerly known as the Madden Building) is a 26-story office tower in downtown Detroit, Michigan. The building's construction began in 1987 and was completed in 1989. It stands at 26 stories tall, with two basement floors, for a total of 28.

Detroit's two oldest law firms, Butzel Long and Miller, Canfield, Paddock & Stone, are headquartered in the building. KPMG and Amazon also have offices 150 West Jefferson.

== History ==
REDICO, a Southfield-based commercial real estate firm, purchased the building in July 2016.

== Architecture ==
The building's main exterior materials include glass, granite, and concrete in a postmodern architectural design. The high-rise building is primarily used as an office tower, with a parking garage, restaurant and retail offices inside it. The 150 West Jefferson high rise replaced the Detroit Stock Exchange Building. Some of the façade of the old building was preserved and incorporated into the interior and exterior decoration of the new building. The skyscraper rises 444' 6" from its front entrance off West Jefferson Avenue. The back entrance off the podium on Larned Street actually sits 7' lower.

Four flagpoles, each 30 feet (9 m) high, are located at each corner of the top of the slanted roof. Each displays an American flag; the four can be seen across the river in Windsor, Ontario.

The Financial District station of the Detroit People Mover system is adjacent to the building, accessible via an entrance in the lobby.

== See also ==
- List of tallest buildings in Detroit
