= Gin'nnah Muhammad =

American Muslim woman

Gin'nnah Muhammad (pronounced /jenna) (born in Detroit, Michigan, July, 1963), is a Muslim African American woman who was dismissed from a Michigan small claims court in 2006 by a judge because she was wearing a veil (as required under Islam). The judge claimed he needed to see her face to assess her truthfulness.

In 2009 Gin'nnah Muhammad went on to the Michigan Supreme Court and spoke to the panel of judges wearing her veil. The result was that the court ruled that judges could regulate the clothing of witnesses.
