= Robert Mac =

American comedian (born 1968)

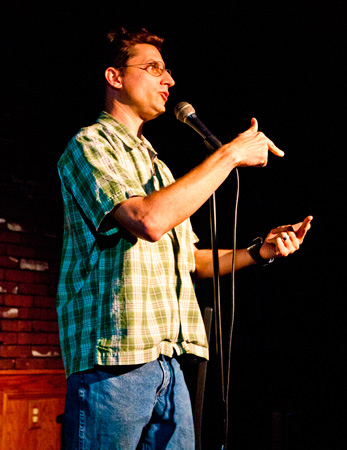
- Mac at Laffs Comedy Caffe in June 2011
- Born: Robert Matthew Matz; January 26, 1968 (age 58); Detroit, Michigan, U.S.

Comedy career
- Years active: 1993 – present
- Medium: Stand-up, television
- Website: Official Website

Robert Mac (born Robert Matthew Matz on January 26, 1968) is an American comedian.

== Life and career ==
Robert Mac was born in Detroit, Michigan in 1968, but moved with his family to Tucson, Arizona in 1972. He graduated from Salpointe Catholic High School in 1986 and attended the University of Arizona from 1986 to 1991, where he graduated with a dual major of Bachelor of Arts, magna cum laude in Creative Writing and Bachelor of Fine Arts, magna cum laude & Honors in Media Arts.

Mac began stand-up comedy at Laff's Comedy Club in Tucson in 1993, although he was a Top Ten Finalist in Billy Crystal's Mr. Saturday Night comedy contest in 1992.

In 2001, Mac was a Finalist in the San Francisco International Comedy Competition. He won Comedy Central's national Laugh Riot competition in 2001, and subsequently appeared on Comedy Central's Premium Blend and secured a spot at the Montreal Just for Laughs Festival in 2002.

He has appeared on NBC's Late Friday, A Dating Story on The Learning Channel(TLC), and the Jerry Lewis MDA Telethon, where he was a Talent Search Winner in 2003. In 2007 he was a Finalist in the Boston Comedy Festival and appeared in the inaugural Great American Comedy Festival in 2008.

In 2007, Mac launched a presidential campaign as part of the alternative newsweekly Tucson Weekly's Project White House, wherein the paper assisted would-be candidates in registering to be on the state's Presidential Primary ballot. Mac registered for the Arizona primary as a Democratic Party candidate.

In 2008, Mac appeared on Season 6 of NBC's Last Comic Standing, where he was eliminated in the first round. He was, however, featured in a spotlight segment in the episode.

He has performed with Robin Williams, Adam Sandler, Larry the Cable Guy, Margaret Cho, Patton Oswalt, and Victoria Jackson.

In 2001, Entertainment Business Journal ranked Mac 67 out of the top 100 stand-up comedians in the U.S.

Mac started and operates a comedy walking tour business in San Francisco called FOOT! Tours, which combines history and comedy in a game show format. Mac has a staff of comedians and performers who host the tours.

He continues to tour the country, performing at comedy clubs and casinos throughout the western United States.
