= Barbara Gilders =

American diver

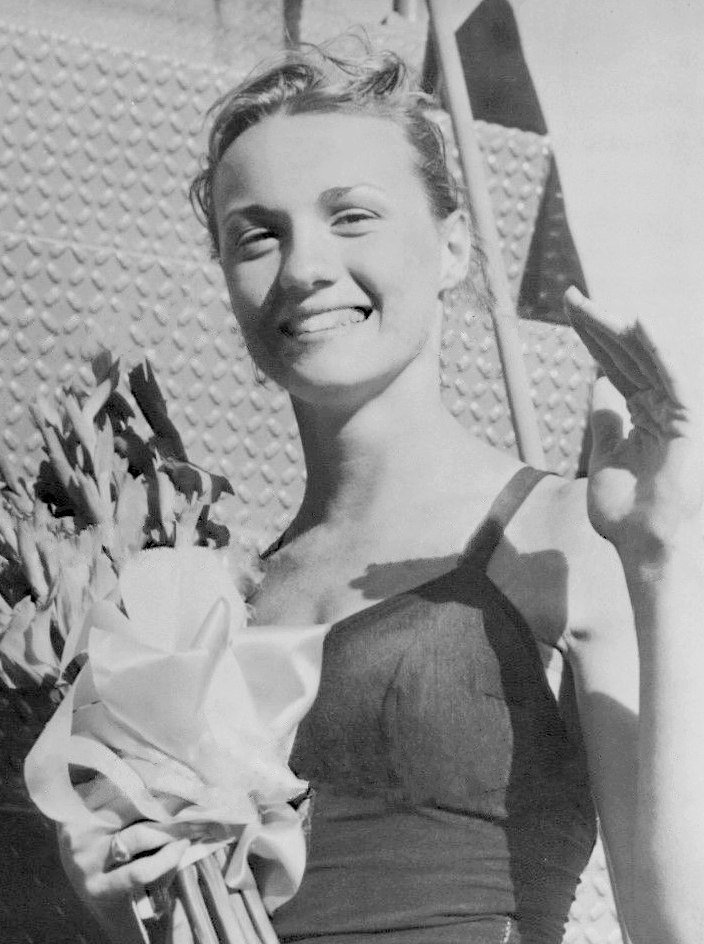
- Gilders in 1959

Personal information
- Full name: Barbara Sue Gilders
- Born: July 23, 1937 (age 89) Detroit, Michigan, U.S.
- Height: 5 ft 3 in (160 cm)
- Weight: 110 lb (50 kg)

Sport
- Sport: Diving
- Club: Detroit Athletic Club
- Coached by: Clarence Pinkston
Medal record
Women's diving
Representing the United States
Pan American Games
Bronze medal – third place	1959 Chicago	3 m springboard

Barbara Sue Gilders (later Dudeck, born July 23, 1937) is a retired American diver. She competed in the 3 m springboard at the 1956 Summer Olympics and 1959 Pan American Games and finished fourth and third, respectively. Coached by four-time Olympic medalist, Clarence Pinkston, Gilders entered the Olympics as the 1956 AAU champion, and Olympic Trials silver medalist. Later she won the AAU indoor titles in the one-meter (1958) and three-meter springboard (1959). In June 1959, she won the Pan American Games trials; later that summer, in what would be her final international competition, Gilders won a bronze medal at the Pan American Games.

== Personal life ==
Gilders is a native of Detroit, MI, and attended Mackenzie High School.

Gilders is the younger sister of Fletcher Gilders, a two-time NCAA diving champion at Ohio State. Fletcher was also a Hall of Fame Diving Coach for Ohio University and three-time NCAA Division III Coach of the Year at Kenyon College. Gilders married John Dudeck, a former swimmer for Michigan State University. A Big Ten Conference record holder and two-time Big Ten titlist in the 100-yard breaststroke (1953 and 54), he was a nine-time All-American for the Spartans (1953–55). Their daughter Diane Dudeck won the national indoor title in the one-meter springboard in 1981; she was also a 1984 NCAA All-American.
