= Beverly Hannah Jones =

American architect

- Education: Michigan State University, Lawrence Technological University
- Occupations: Architect, entrepreneur, community leader
- Website: www.hannaharchitects.com

Beverly Hannah Jones is an American architect, entrepreneur, and Black community leader in Michigan. She has been profiled as an "architect extraordinaire" as early as May 1995, and as half of "the dynamic duo of Detroit's downtown restaurants."

== Biography ==
While in a pre-medical program at Michigan State University, she took a few drafting courses, and then switched her major to architecture and began pursuing the goal of owning her own firm. She transferred to Lawrence Technological University in order to simultaneously build architectural skills and learn to run a business. She earned a bachelor's degree in 1985 and took a job with Albert Kahn Associates, where she worked for eight years and earned her architectural license.

She then moved on to a smaller firm in Pontiac to get hands-on experience with business leadership, and the next year, launched her own firm, Hannah & Associates, Inc.

In 1993 she founded Hannah & Associates, Inc. (HAI) to provide professional architectural and interior design services. It is one of only ten architectural firms owned and operated by a licensed African American Female Architect in the United States. Hannah Jones has 30 years of experience in the architectural planning, design and construction industry. Her professional experiences range from project architect, project designer, project manager through project principal and owner of the corporation.

As of 1996 her firm, Hannah & Associates Inc., was one of only ten architecture firms in the United States owned by black women. Early projects included a church sanctuary and automotive contracts, including collaboration with Albert Kahn. In 2005 Hannah & Associates was one of only five firms founded and run by Black women.

Hannah & Associates formed a partnership with Niagara Murano LLC, a firm owned by a former colleague from Albert Kahn, in 2004. The firms designed several restaurants for Detroit's Southern Hospitality Restaurant Group. In 2005 Hannah Jones was appointed to the Michigan Fire Safety Board.

In 2013, Hannah & Associates formed a strategic partnership with Newman-Smith Architecture. In addition to her roles at HAI, Beverly is a Managing Partner of Hannah-Neumann/Smith. As Managing Partner, she has responsibility for all contractual matters and oversees the quality and progress of the project from start to finish. Her recent venture in the construction industry is to launch a fleet of construction dump trucks with her new company, Arawana Construction Trucking, Inc.

== See also ==
- Architecture of metropolitan Detroit
