= Walter B. Brady =

American politician

Walter B. Brady was an American politician from Detroit. He was a member of the Michigan State House of Representatives from Wayne County 1st District from 1927 to 1932.
