= Jessie Jefferson =

American community organizer

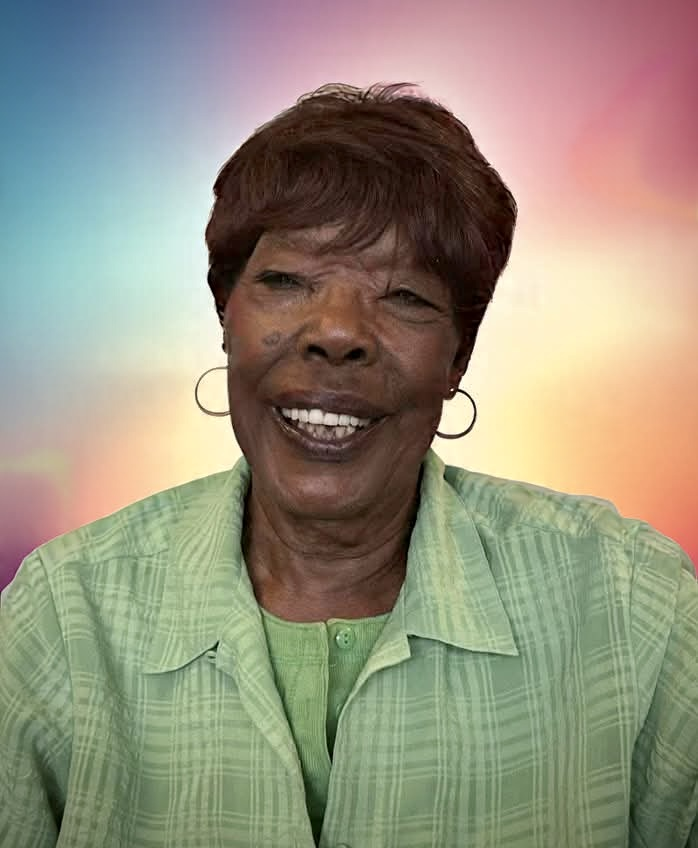
- 2025
- Occupation: Community organizer
- Years active: 1990s–present
- Employers: AT&T (retired); Kansas City Health Department (part-time)
- Board member of: Kansas City Neighborhood Advisory Council (3rd District)
- Children: 1

Jessie Jefferson is an American community organizer and neighborhood advocate in Kansas City, Missouri, known for her work in the city's East Side. In the 1990s, she retired from a career as a supervisor for AT&T, and launched a new career as a largely unpaid volunteer, consultant, and mentor. She is the Third District representative on the City of Kansas City's Neighborhood Advisory Council.

Kansas City PBS featured her as a "Neighborhood Champion" and a "Changemaker", and the University of Kansas's Center for Community Health and Development uses her activities as a case study for building community leadership. She has provided guidance to numerous neighborhood associations, including the Ivanhoe Neighborhood Council, Washington-Wheatley Neighborhood Association, and Oak Park Neighborhood Association, helping them secure funding and implement local programs.

== Early life ==
Jefferson grew up on the city's West Side in what was described as a "Bible-centric family" with a strong connection to the Greenwood Baptist Church, which was at 18th Street and Belleview Avenue. She graduated from Central High School in 1961, which at the time was regarded as "one of the most esteemed schools in the state".

== Career ==
Jefferson retired as supervisor for AT&T in the 1990s. She focused on community organizing, which had begun through her church. She is a part-time employee of the Kansas City Health Department for community engagement. Her approach is based on proactive engagement, which she described: "You just start doing stuff... and you answer to this persistent calling to solve neighbors' problems because 'you can’t say no'". Most of her work is unpaid, and she reflected, "You can't pay me for what I do".

She was recommended by her pastor to run a Community Action Network (CAN) Center at 27th Street and Troost Avenue, described at the time as "one of the most distressed corners in the city". At the CAN Center, she led initiatives to counter the proliferation of liquor stores and to confront pimps and drug dealers. She also organized youth activities, planted a vegetable garden, established tutoring programs, and partnered with the Full Employment Council to create jobs for local young adults. She recalled earning the community's trust, stating, "those kids wouldn't let anything happen to me".

She has focused on mentoring "a new generation of neighborhood leaders" on Kansas City's East Side. She has served as a consultant to associations including Town Fork Creek, Oak Park, Vineyard, South Roundtop, Seven Oaks, Blue Valley, McCoy, Washington Wheatley, and Independence Plaza. A key part of her work is "arguing for commitments from city department heads and council members to carve out financial support for these neighborhood associations". She explains her motivation by her admiration for the volunteer leaders she supports: "I see how hard they work... And they don’t get a dime".

She compiled a "'how-to guide' for block captains and neighborhood association presidents" and utilizes a "dialing list full of officials' personal numbers, many of them people she got to know in their neighborhoods long before they became department heads".

=== Neighborhood associations ===
Jefferson's guidance has helped neighborhood associations build capacity to address systemic issues and secure funding. Her work in the Ivanhoe neighborhood is a key example of her model. When the Ewing Marion Kauffman Foundation funded a project to build a support network for Ivanhoe, Jefferson "led the way", spending "hours a day walking the neighborhood's 400 blocks" to organize residents into a system of block captains. This provided the foundation for the Ivanhoe Neighborhood Council (INC), which has become a comprehensive community development corporation. The INC has since launched home repair programs, youth and senior services, community gardens, a tool lending library, and a farmers market. It has secured multiple Community Development Block Grants and a ReBuild KC grant for the Garfield East Senior Cottages project.

After decades of "disinvestment and population decline", the Washington-Wheatley Neighborhood Association (WWNA) began a revitalization effort with guidance from consultants including Jefferson. WWNA partnered with the Local Initiatives Support Corporation (LISC) to create a development and resiliency plan. The neighborhood was subsequently chosen by the city as the pilot for its Housing Accelerator program, which aims to convert 95 acres (38 ha) of vacant lots into affordable housing. In May 2025, the United States Environmental Protection Agency (EPA) awarded Kansas City a grant that designated $4 million for the remediation of 47 vacant lots in Washington-Wheatley. The award was one of only eight at that funding level nationwide. Mayor Quinton Lucas stated the investment would "accelerate our work transforming environmental challenges into neighborhood opportunities". Third District Councilmember Melissa Patterson Hazley called the award "a milestone in restoring neighborhoods that have long been overlooked". She represents the Third District on the City of Kansas City's Neighborhood Advisory Council.

Leaders of the Oak Park neighborhood association focus on cleanups and crime prevention programs like the Hoops at Night basketball league. The association received a Neighborhood Empowerment Grant in 2023 to increase resident awareness and membership.

The Vineyard Neighborhood Association was a 2023 grant recipient, and it collaborates with police and schools and operates a food pantry with Harvesters.

== Recognition ==
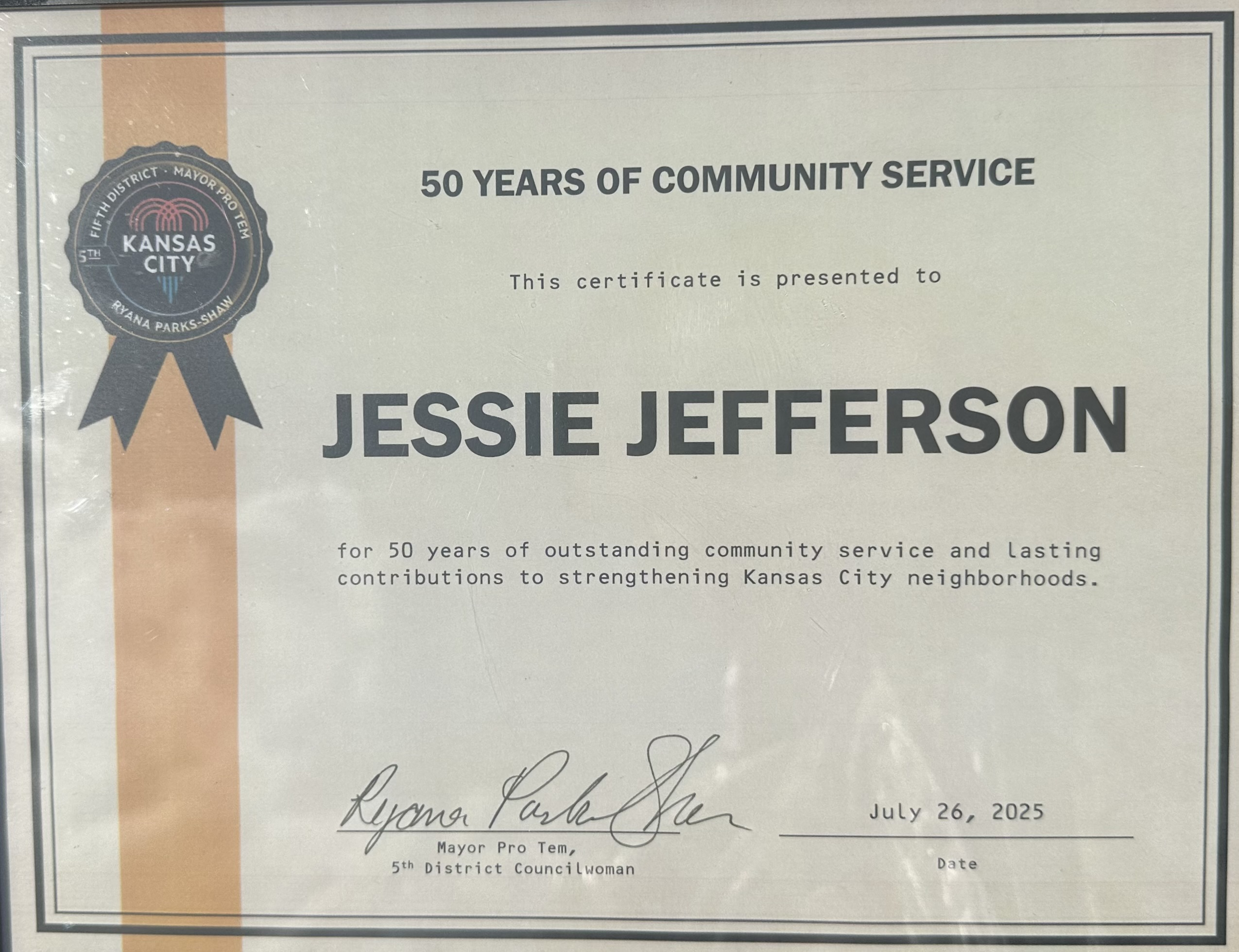
On July 26, 2025, Jessie Jefferson received a certificate from Mayor Pro Tem for 50 years of community service to Kansas City, Missouri.

Jefferson's work has been recognized by Kansas City's government, public media, and academic institutions. Officials have praised the grant programs that support the groups she mentors.

In 2019, Kansas City's public television station, KCPT, featured Jefferson as a "Neighborhood Champion" for a series on "unsung leaders in the community". She is featured in the Changemakers video series from Kansas City PBS, the Ewing Marion Kauffman Foundation, and Network Connectors that spotlights "emerging nonprofit leaders within our community".

The University of Kansas Center for Community Health and Development selected Jefferson's work as a case study for its Community Tool Box resource. The case study, titled Example 7: Tireless 'Ms. Jessie' Cultivates Next Generation of Neighborhood Leaders, is used to illustrate the core competency of "Building Leadership".

Her work in community health was noted in a 2007 report in the Centers for Disease Control and Prevention's journal, Preventing Chronic Disease, which mentioned her past role as a member of the KC-CDC (Kansas City-Chronic Disease Coalition) executive committee.

== Personal life ==
She has a daughter who is an attorney in St. Louis and a grandson.

== See also ==
- Alvin Brooks, another storied Kansas City activist
- City workhouse castle
