= Justice Lumpkin =

Justice Lumpkin may refer to:

- Alva M. Lumpkin (1886–1941), acting associate justice of the South Carolina Supreme Court
- Joseph H. Lumpkin II (1856–1916), associate justice of the Supreme Court of Georgia
- Joseph Henry Lumpkin (1799–1867), chief justice of the Supreme Court of Georgia
- Samuel Lumpkin (judge) (1848–1903), associate justice of the Supreme Court of Georgia
