= Louis-Césaire Dagneau Douville de Quindre =

Merchant and militia officer

Louis-Césaire Dagneau Douville de Quindre (1704 – February 2, 1767) was a merchant and militia officer. He was involved in the North American fur trade.

The son of Michel Dagneau Douville and Marie Lamy, he was baptized at Sorel. In 1736, he married Françoise-Marie-Anne Picoté de Belestre. During the late 1730s, he operated the Michipicoton trading post with Claude Marin de la Perrière. In the early 1740s, he moved to Fort St. Joseph, where he traded in partnership with Marin. In 1747, de Quindre and Marin moved to Michilimackinac. Some time later, he moved to Detroit. There he was named a colonel in the local militia. In 1759, he and his brother were captured when they tried to relieve Fort Niagara, then under siege by the English. The two prisoners were later released. At the end of the Seven Years' War, Detroit fell under the control of the English and de Quindre continued his trading operations there under English rule.

He died at Detroit at the age of 62.
