= Royce Howes =

Detroit journalist and writer (1901–1973)

Royce Bucknam Howes (January 3, 1901 – March 18, 1973) was a Pulitzer Prize-winning journalist and writer who also published a biography of Edgar A. Guest and a number of crime novels. He worked for the Detroit Free Press from 1927 to 1966 and won the Pulitzer Prize in 1955 for an editorial on the cause of an unauthorized strike by an autoworkers local that idled 45,000 Chrysler workers.

== Newspaper career ==
=== Writer and editorial director ===
Born in 1901 in Minneapolis, Minnesota, Royce Howes moved to Detroit and began a long career with the Detroit Free Press in 1927. He remained with the Free Press for 39 years until his retirement in 1966. Howes eventually served as the editorial director of the paper. In 1955, Howes wrote an editorial that was covered in other papers about the role of the newspaper in American society. He began with a dissection of the tangible things in a newspaper—paper and ink. But he concluded that news "is all things to all men. What it is depends on who is defining it. And it is YOUR definition, not the editor's, which matters." Howes's colleague at the Free Press, columnist Malcolm Bingay, said of Howes: "My friend and colleague, Col. Royce Howes, knows a great deal about a surprising number of things that ordinary mortals never think about. That is why he is such a successful novelist and short story writer."

=== Pulitzer Prize ===
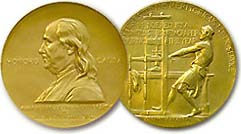
Pulitzer Prize

Howes received the 1955 Pulitzer Prize for Editorial Writing for an editorial published July 16, 1954, titled "An Instance of Costly Cause and Effect Which Detroiters Should Weigh Soberly". He also won the National Headliner Award for editorial writing. Howes's award-winning editorial concerned an unauthorized July 1954 strike by a local of the United Automobile Workers' union. The strike shut down production at Chrysler Corporation and put 45,000 Chrysler workers out of work. In awarding the prize to Howes, the Pulitzer organization noted that Howes's editorial impartially and clearly assessed the shared responsibility of both labor and management. The Pulitzer Prize organization found that

the editorial made a notable contribution to public understanding of the whole program of the respective responsibilities and relationships of labor and management in this field.

== Military service ==
Howes also served in the U.S. Army during World War II, achieving the rank of Lieutenant Colonel and receiving the Bronze Star. He was an editor for the Army newspaper "Stars and Stripes."

== Author ==
=== Biographer of Edgar A. Guest ===
Howes was a close friend for many years of the prolific American poet Edgar A. Guest. Guest published his poetry in the Detroit Free Press, and Howes served as Guest's long-time editor and eventually as his biographer. The Los Angeles Times said of Howes's biography of Guest: "His editor and longtime friend Royce Howes has written the biography Guest deserves ... Royce Howes has done a biography of a likeable and human man in not too adulatory a fashion; and it is readable." The Yuma Daily Sun noted: "Hearty friendship and mutuality of association combined with author competence have produced a book which, in the most vital sense, will be of interest to all Americans."

=== Crime novelist ===
In the 1930s and 1940s, Howes also wrote and published numerous crime novels, many for the "Crime Club". The "Crime Club" novels were popular in the 1930s and were described as "a mark which always signifies, if not a masterpiece of detective fiction, at least an entertaining one." His crime novels include:

- "Death on the Bridge" published in 1935 for the Crime Club.
- "The Callao Clue" published in 1936 by the Crime Club. The Callao Clue is a shipboard murder mystery with a detective trying to solve the murder before the ship reaches port. The Galveston Daily News called it a rather ingenious and thrilling melodrama."
- "Death Dupes a Lady" published in 1937 for the Crime Club. One reviewer wrote the following about Death Dupes a Lady:

"Mr. Howes rings the bell with a vengeance in this his fourth murder thriller. It is five-star in every respect: the plot is grimly exciting ...; the characters are rounded and full-bodied men and women ...; and there are sparkles of humor, just a dash of spice, and the whole thing is excellently written. Indeed, Death Dupes a Lady is the murder thriller pick of those that have come this way this season."

- "Murder at Maneuvers", a tale of sudden death in an army training camp, published in 1938 for the Crime Club.
- "Death Rides a Hobby", published in 1939 for the Crime Club. The Los Angeles Times described "Death Rides a Hobby" as "an amusing mystery of how an amateur photographer finds death in his own lens. Another reviewer said: "This story, gently titled Death Rides a Hobby, shows camera fiends what their friends think of them, with a bit of humor, some ingenuity and even some finesse."
- "Night of the Garter Murder" published in 1939.
- "The Nasty Name Murders", story about the murder of the Second Officer on a "hell ship," published in 1939 by the Crime Club. The Oakland Tribune noted that Howes's recurring character, homicide Capt. Ben Lucias, "is always a pleasant mystery companion." Another reviewer offered the following praise for Howes's latest work involving Capt. Ben Lucias:

You can't beat these murder-thrillers about Capt. Ben Lucias for good solid workmanlike killing, catching and confessing. ... (Howes) misses no opportunities, produces clues effectively, and runs them to earth with equal satisfaction for all concerned but the murderer—he, she or they strike three times here.

- "The Case of the Copy-Hook Killing", published in 1945 for the Crime Club.

== Death ==
Howes died on March 18, 1973, at William Beaumont Hospital in Royal Oak, Michigan. He is buried at Detroit's Elmwood Cemetery.
