= 2 Sins =

American rapper

- Origin: Detroit
- Genres: Horrorcore
- Years active: 1993–present
- Labels: Long Range Distribution, Born-A-Sin Musick
- Members: Low Life; Lethal
- Past members: Mack Ten

2 Sins is an American hip hop duo from Detroit, Michigan. They are known for their violent lyrics and most significant for their best-selling 1994 release, Look What Hell Created.

== Biography ==
Members Low Life and Lethal were born and raised in Detroit, Michigan. They began making music together in early 1993. Their first album, entitled Look What Hell Created, was released in the summer of 1994. They would go on to record and produce over sixteen albums and EPs.

== Discography ==
=== Albums and EPs ===
Year	Album title	Charts
1994	Look What Hell Created	—
1995	Devil'z Night: Let the City Burn	—
1997	Last Day on Earth	—
2004	Welcome to Hell	—
2005	Return of the Wicket: The E.P.	—
2005	That Sinful Shit: Underground Bootleg Vol. 2	—
2006	Decade of Evil: Best of the Early Years	—
2006	Hell Awaits (with Stitch Mouth)	—
2007	That Sinful Shit, Vol. 2	—
2007	Underground Bootleg Volume 1: An Adult Nightmare	—
2008	Street Testament	—
2009	B4 the Storm (Lethal)	—
2009	The Exorcist (Low Life)	—
2011	Last Day on Earth	—
2011	Look What Hell Created	—
2011	Rest In Peace Tha Album	—
2012	Underground Bootleg: The Ultimate Collection	—
2012	Devil'z Night	—

=== Singles ===
Year	Single
2010	Rest in Peace (1994-2009)

=== As featured performer ===
Year	Title
2005	Jadius - The Mixtape
2006	C Kane - Show No Mercy
2007	Jadius - American Psycho
2009	C Kane - Farewell To The Flesh
