= Rosetta Pebble =

American rock band

- Origin: Detroit, Michigan, United States
- Genres: Folk pop, rock,
- Years active: 1999–present
- Labels: Hit City
- Members: Eric Frakes; Steve Gulian; James Gross
- Past members: Tim Brickley; Wil Osler; Chris Plansker; Jef Reynolds

Rosetta Pebble is an American rock band from Detroit, Michigan. Their name is a vague reference to the ancient Rosetta Stone. Rosetta Pebble achieved a small degree of popularity in Detroit, parts of Michigan, and northern Indiana during the first half of the 2000s due to the band's folky, pop songs. Influenced by folk rock (most notably the music of Cat Stevens, James Taylor, Jack Johnson, the Beatles and Pete Townshend), Rosetta Pebble play a more pop-oriented variation of folk rock. The band is also commonly classified into the category of acoustic/soft rock.

== History ==
Rosetta Pebble was formed by Eric Frakes and Steve Gulian in summer 1999, in Barcelona, Spain. Both musicians, originally from the Detroit area, had arranged to meet up overseas that summer, and share song ideas they had been writing independently. On leave from a year teaching in Indonesia, Gulian had been traveling home westward and Frakes met up with him in Germany. The pair performed their first collaborations on the streets of Barcelona and San Sebastian for late-night revelers whose feedback in the form of attention span and pesetas helped to separate the musical wheat from the chaff, and financed the purchase of a nice hand-drum, as well as enough sangria and tapas to keep the two motivated. The duo continued traveling throughout Europe that summer, performing wherever they could, and fine tuning the songs that later became their first CD. Rosetta Pebble, as an official group, was born upon their return to Michigan at the end of that summer.

== Music ==
As a two-man song writing collective, Gulian and Frakes began recording at Hit City in Indianapolis, Indiana, where they worked with producer/engineer/singer-songwriter Tim Brickley. With Brickley's creative input and production, Pebble's first CD, Stories That The World Once Told, was recorded in 2002. The group's second project, Clear Across Summer was released in fall 2005.

In performance, the two alternate between playing acoustic guitar and singing lead vocals or handling the percussion and harmony vocals. Their one-of-a-kind drum set could be considered a work of art in itself. Its collection of hand percussion from far-flung parts of the world has been artistically arrayed on iron stands created by several Michigan metal sculptors.

In late 2009 and 2010, the duo sporadically traveled back and forth to Indianapolis to record once again with Brickley at Hit City in Indianapolis. Two in-progress tracks, "Long Ago Train" by Frakes, and "I Wish You Well" by Gulian, appeared on the debut episode of Brickley's Different Beat Radio show/podcast on 27 Jan 2010. Their third album, Three, was released in January, 2011 on compact disc and on iTunes.

In spring 2011, John Halbert, a producer in Los Angeles, was appointed Executive Vice President and Senior Marketing Director of West Coast Theatre of Operations. He works with people in the music industry to raise awareness of the band.

== Core members ==
- Eric Frakes: acoustic guitar/percussion/harmonica/mandolin/vocals (1999–present)
- Steve Gulian: acoustic guitar/percussion/vocals (1999–present)
- James Gross: viola (2001–present)

== Guest musicians ==
- Tim Brickley: bass/keyboards/acoustic and electric guitars/production
- Chris Plansker: keyboards
- Bill Osler: drums
- Jeff Reynolds: bass guitar

All teach at various schools in the Grosse Pointe School System

== Discography ==
- Stories That The World Once Told (2002)
- Clear Across Summer (2005)
- Three (2011)
