= Alice Emma Ives =

American dramatist (1876–1930)

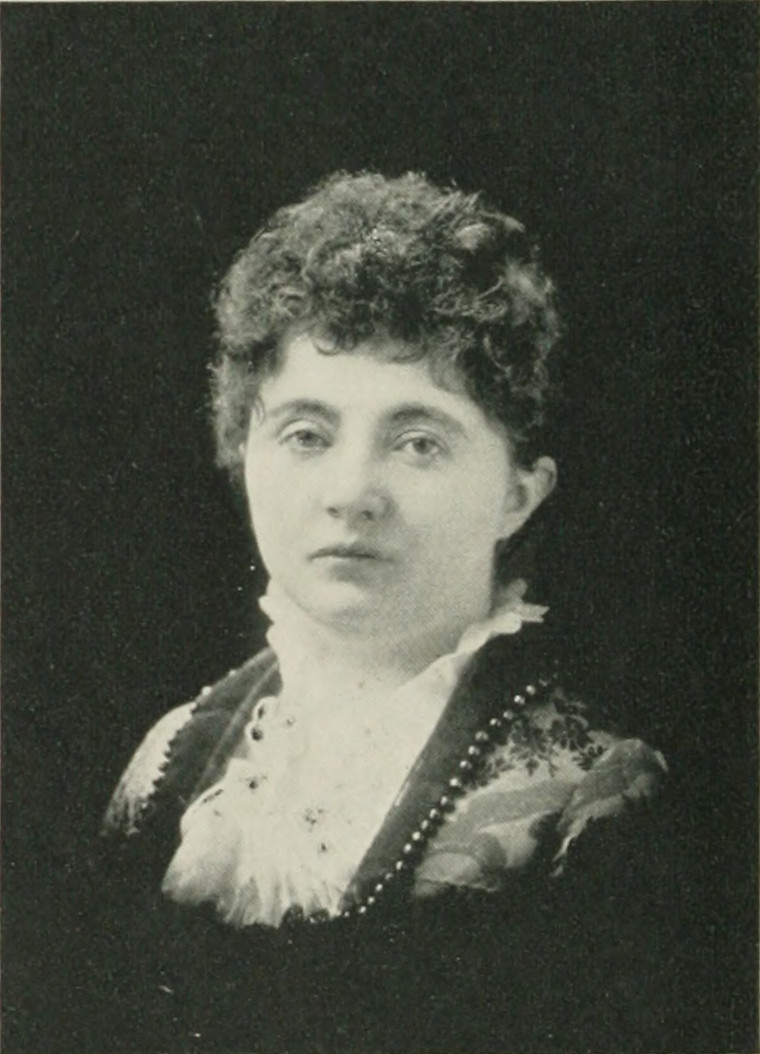
- Photo in A Woman of the Century
- Born: 1876; Detroit, Michigan, U.S.
- Died: 1930 (aged 53–54)
- Occupations: Dramatist, journalist
- Writing career
- Language: English

Alice Emma Ives (1876–1930) was an American dramatist and journalist. A native of Detroit, at an early age, she wrote for the newspapers. She was "one of the more prolific women playwrights of the Victorian era". She had considerable success as a writer of verse and short stories, also as a dramatic and art critic. Her stories, written for New York City and Detroit papers, were quite extensively copied. One which appeared in the Detroit Free Fress enjoyed the rounds of different journals, and reached as far as New Zealand. Her verses appeared in Our Continent and the New York Sunday Mercury.

== Early life and education ==
Alice Emma Ives was born in Detroit, Michigan, 1876, where she lived until September, 1890, when she moved with her mother to New York City. Ives' father died when she was two years old. Her literary bent was early shown. Before she knew how to write in cursive, she printed the verses which she composed. When about seventeen years of age, she wrote her first story, which was promptly accepted by Frank Leslie. So severe was she in judging her work that, instead of being elated at her success, she was appalled at what seemed to her an unwarrantable presumption, and never sent another line to a publisher for ten years.

== Career ==
She very early felt the necessity of earning her own living, and after a time that of two others. With her strong imaginative nature rebelling against the uncongenial task, she taught school till her health broke down under the strain. Then she began to send poems and stories to the press. They were extensively copied, but paid for poorly. Her first regular journalistic work was art criticism, and her articles attracted so much notice as to make for her a reputation. She then became a regular contributor to the Art Amateur. Compiling books, writing plays, magazine articles, dramatic criticisms, and, in short, all-around newspaper work, thereafter were her work.

Her magazine article which attracted the most attention was "The Domestic Purse-Strings," in the Forum, September, 1890. It was copied and commented on in column editorials, from London and New York to San Francisco.

Ives, the playwright, is best known by The Village Postmaster and The Brooklyn Handicap. The latter was performed in 1894. Its theme is a sensational Brooklyn horse race. Ives stated:—"In order to write the play, I lived on the race-track for a couple of months, and I read all the sporting papers I could." The Village Postmaster, 1896, describes a rural spot in New Hampshire, with rustic types. A country atmosphere pervades the play. Her first play, Don Roderic, was praised by Lawrence Barrett; Reward, a society drama, was presented in Detroit. Lorine, a Russian story, was played by Frederick Paulding in 1894; its production in Palmer's Theater, New York, was successful. Lavarre and A Flower of the Hills, are also her works. Old Miss Pod was written for Neil Burgess; and The Checkered Hat, was a one-act vaudeville play. Ives was a member of the "Twelfth Night" and other New York clubs. She died in 1930.

== Selected works ==
- Calanthy's mistake. A comedy in one act.
- The social mirror; a complete treatise on the laws, rules and usages that govern our most refined homes and social circles, 1886
- The village postmaster : a picturesque New England play, 1900
- "The blue letter" : a play in four acts , 1901
- The Sweet Elysium Club : a comedy in one act, 1902
- Aunt Penny, a Bay State spinster : a comedy, 1902
- Starr's girl : a play in four acts, 1902
- A hurry call marriage : a comedy in one act, 1903
- The arrival of Miss Hammond,, 1907

=== By Alice E. Ives and Jerome H. Eddy ===
- The village postmaster : a domestic drama in four acts, 1894

=== By Alice E. Ives, et al. ===
- Our society : a complete treatise of the usages that govern the most refined homes and social circles. Our moral, social physical and business culture, 1891
