= Bertrand Curtis Spitzley =

American housing developer

Bertrand Curtis Spitzley (March 13, 1880 – March 26, 1954) was a housing developer in the metro Detroit, Michigan area. He was the first developer in the Detroit area to in addition to selling off lots in a new subdivision, but up houses on the lots before sale, thus creating more housing that was available to the less affluent. His first project was located along Mack Avenue six miles east of Detroit's downtown.

Spitzley was born in New York City in 1880. His father, Jacob Henry, was a building inspector. His first job was working for the Detroit Dry Dock and Shipbuilding Company, when he gained a grounding in mechanical engineering. He later worked at Wolff & Zwicker Iron Works in Portland, Oregon building torpedo boats, before taking up the position of acting chief draughtsman at the Puget Sound Naval Shipyard in Bremerton, Washington. He returned to Detroit in 1906, taking a job at the Abbott Motor Company, where he progressed to general manager before he resigned in late 1912. His career in real estate had begun in 1910, and in 1913, he co-founded the Houseman-Spitzley Company, which became the Houseman-Spitzley Corporation in 1916, when its capital stock was valued at $1.4 million.

Spitzley was a Blue Lodge Freemason. He died in a Miami hospital in 1954. He was survived by his wife Ida May née Bullene, who he married in 1902, and two of his children.
