= Carl Owens =

American artist

Carl Owens (1929 – December 11, 2002) was an American artist born in Detroit, Michigan. His professional experience in the Art began as an illustrator in the U.S. Army. Later, he taught art in the Detroit Public Schools and served as staff artist for the school system. He was a member of the National Conference of Artists and worked as a self-employed artist from 1968 until his death.

In addition to numerous private collections, his fine art has been on exhibition at: The Whitney Museum of American Art, New York; The Minneapolis Institute of Arts; The Art Institute of Chicago; the M. H. de Young Memorial Museum, San Francisco; the Detroit Institute of Arts; the Cincinnati Art Museum; the Smithsonian Institution, Washington, DC; the North American Black Historical Museum, Ontario, Canada; the Charles H. Wright Museum of African American History, Detroit, Michigan; and the Detroit Historical Museum.

== Awards ==
- the New York Society of Illustrators Citation for Merit
- Outstanding Artist Award, Michigan Chapter
- National Conference of Artists
- the Mayor's Award of Merit
- the American Black Artists Pioneer Award
- the Optimists International Certificate of Appreciation for Community Service
- the American Black Artists Award for Outstanding Achievement in Visual Arts
- The National Conference of Artists First Afrikan World Festival Award
- Testimonial Resolution and Spirit of Detroit Award from the Detroit City Council

== Paintings ==
- Great Kings of Africa
- Soul of a Nation
- Roots, Stems and Flowers
- Ford Salutes the Black Composer
- Ingenious Americans
- The Life of Frederick Douglass
- A Picture History of the Afro-American
- Sisters of The Sun
- Strong Women
- Strong Men
