= Lumpkins =

Lumpkins is an English surname. Notable people with the surname include:

- Stephen Lumpkins (born 1990), American former professional baseball and basketball player
- William Lumpkins (1909–2000), American artist and architect

== See also ==
- Lumpkins Fork, a river in Missouri
- Lumpkins Stadium, a stadium in Waxahachie, Texas
