= Rick Byas =

American football player (born 1950)

No. 38
- Position: Defensive back

Personal information
- Born: October 19, 1950 (age 76); Detroit, Michigan, U.S.
- Listed height: 5 ft 9 in (1.75 m)
- Listed weight: 180 lb (82 kg)

Career information
- High school: Mackenzie (MI)
- College: Eastern Michigan; Wayne State
- NFL draft: 1974: undrafted

Career history
- Atlanta Falcons (1974–1980)

Career NFL statistics
- Interceptions: 6
- Fumble recoveries: 10
- Defensive TDs: 2
- Stats at Pro Football Reference

Richard Reese Byas Jr. (October 19, 1950) is an American former professional football player who was a defensive back in the National Football League (NFL). He played college football for the Eastern Michigan Eagles and Wayne State Warriors. He was a 1987 inductee to the Wayne State University Athletic Hall of Fame.

== Early life and college ==
While at Detroit's Mackenzie High School, Byas led the football team through an undefeated campaign in 1967. That year, Mackenzie's opponents scored only two points during the entire teacher strike-shortened season. Upon graduation in 1969, Byas attended Eastern Michigan University.

After one year at EMU, Byas transferred to Wayne State; during three seasons with WSU, Byas set or tied eight career, single season and single game football records. In 1973, Byas established WSU single season records for kickoff returns, kickoff return yardage, punt returns, and punt return yardage. Byas was primarily a sprinter and long jumper during his collegiate track and field career; in his senior year, he was captain of both the WSU track and football team. Richard Byas Jr. received his bachelor's degree in education from Wayne State in 1974; the same year he was signed as a free agent by the NFL's Atlanta Falcons.

== Professional career ==
Through seven full seasons with the Falcons, as a defensive back and kickoff return specialist, Byas played in 103 games and produced six career interceptions for 193 yards and one touchdown. Byas also totaled 23 career kickoff returns for 519 yards and a 22.6 yard average, and he forced several blocked punts that resulted in Atlanta touchdowns. 1977 was arguably Byas's best season as a pro; he intercepted three passes for 122 yards, including one interception resulting in the lone touchdown of his career - a 72-yard return of an Archie Manning pass in Atlanta's 21–20 loss to the New Orleans Saints.
