= Mackenzie High School (Michigan) =

David Mackenzie High School

Location
- 9275 Wyoming Avenue; Detroit, Michigan 48204; United States; 42°21′47″N 83°09′32″W

Information
- School type: Public high school
- Opened: 1928
- Status: Demolished
- Closed: 2007
- School district: Detroit Public Schools
- Grades: 9–12
- Colors: Royal blue and grey
- Nickname: Stags

Mackenzie High School was a public high school in Detroit, Michigan.

== History ==
Located on Detroit's west side, Mackenzie High School was named to honor David D. Mackenzie, who had served as principal of Central High School, and as first dean of the city college that would become Wayne State University.

Mackenzie High School was among the first schools constructed on land acquired through Detroit's westernmost annexation efforts in Greenfield Township; by 1926 the township had ceased to exist. Adorned in blue and yellow tile from the Pewabic Pottery Works, the three-story facility opened in September 1928. In an effort to make efficient use of available classrooms, the school's early history featured a full range of grade levels – elementary through secondary.

In June 2012, the school was demolished, and replaced with a K-8 elementary-middle school, which kept the name of Mackenzie.

== Athletics ==
The Mackenzie Stags were the 1979 boys state basketball champion. Girls track and field won the state championship in 1978.

== Notable alumni ==
- Jerome Bettis – Hall of Fame NFL running back
- Kevin Brooks – NFL defensive end
- Gilbert Brown – NFL defensive tackle
- Richard Byas Jr. – NFL defensive back
- Dennis Coffey – musician
- Kenny Garrett – jazz musician
- Barbara Gilders-Dudeck – Olympic diver
- Paula Gosling – crime novelist
- Saul Green – US Attorney for Eastern District of Michigan
- Pepper Johnson – NFL linebacker
- Bob Keene – former NFL running back, Detroit Lions
- Marilyn Jean Kelly – Chief Justice of the Michigan Supreme Court
- Ray Lane – radio-TV sports personality
- Rawle Marshall – former professional basketball player
- Jeremiah Massey – former professional basketball player
- Jeff Mills – musician
- Stanley Mouse – artist
- Nick Perry – NFL linebacker
- Sidney Ribeau – college academic administrator
- Roz Ryan – actress
- Kenneth Sanborn – former Michigan politician and judge
- Tom Skerritt – actor
- Doug Smith – National Basketball Association (NBA) power forward
- Tony Tashnick – NCAA Champion swimmer
- Reggie Thornton – former NFL wide receiver
- Delisa Walton-Floyd – Olympic middle-distance runner
- Gary Waters – NCAA men's basketball head coach
- Sylvester Wright – former NFL defensive end & linebacker

== See also ==
- 12th Street Riot
