= Tom Lollar =

American ceramist

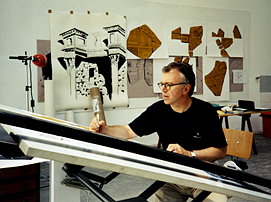
- Tom Lollar
- Born: Thomas W. Lollar; 1951 (age 74–75); Detroit, Michigan
- Education: Western Michigan University
- Known for: Ceramics
- Website: TomLollar.com

Tom Lollar is an American ceramist. He attended Western Michigan University and earned his B.F.A. in Sculpture and Ceramics in 1973 and his M.A. in Ceramics and Art History in 1979.

Tom Lollar hand builds clay murals which depict architectural and geographical themes. Subjects include landmarks in both frontal bas-relief and aerial views. The unique surface color results from applying copper, bronze and platinum metallic paints and glazes. Each rectangular clay construction is approximately 20 in × 20 in × 4 in (510 mm × 510 mm × 100 mm) and may be placed in combinations of unlimited numbers suitable to wall size.

Tom Lollar is currently the head of the Ceramics and Sculpture Department at Columbia University.

Since 1988, he has been the Director of Visual Arts at the Lincoln Center.

He is a trustee of the International Print Center New York.

He began teaching ceramics and sculpture in 1975 and is currently on the faculty of Teachers College, Columbia University. He previously taught at Parsons School of Design in New York City.

== Featured exhibitions ==
- Tiffany & Co. NY
- Columbia University
- Cooper-Hewitt, National Design Museum
- Museum of Arts & Design
- The Karlin Collection in Boston
- American Craft Museum
- Tokyo's Century Plaza Hotel
- Cleveland University-College of Urban Affairs
- Cleveland State University

== Awards ==
- Visiting scholar at the American Academy in Rome
- Fellowship at the Salzburg Seminar
- Fellowship at Jugendstil Design in Austria
- Waldo-Sangren Award for Contemporary Ceramics in England.
