= Alvin Brooks (activist) =

American civil rights activist and public official

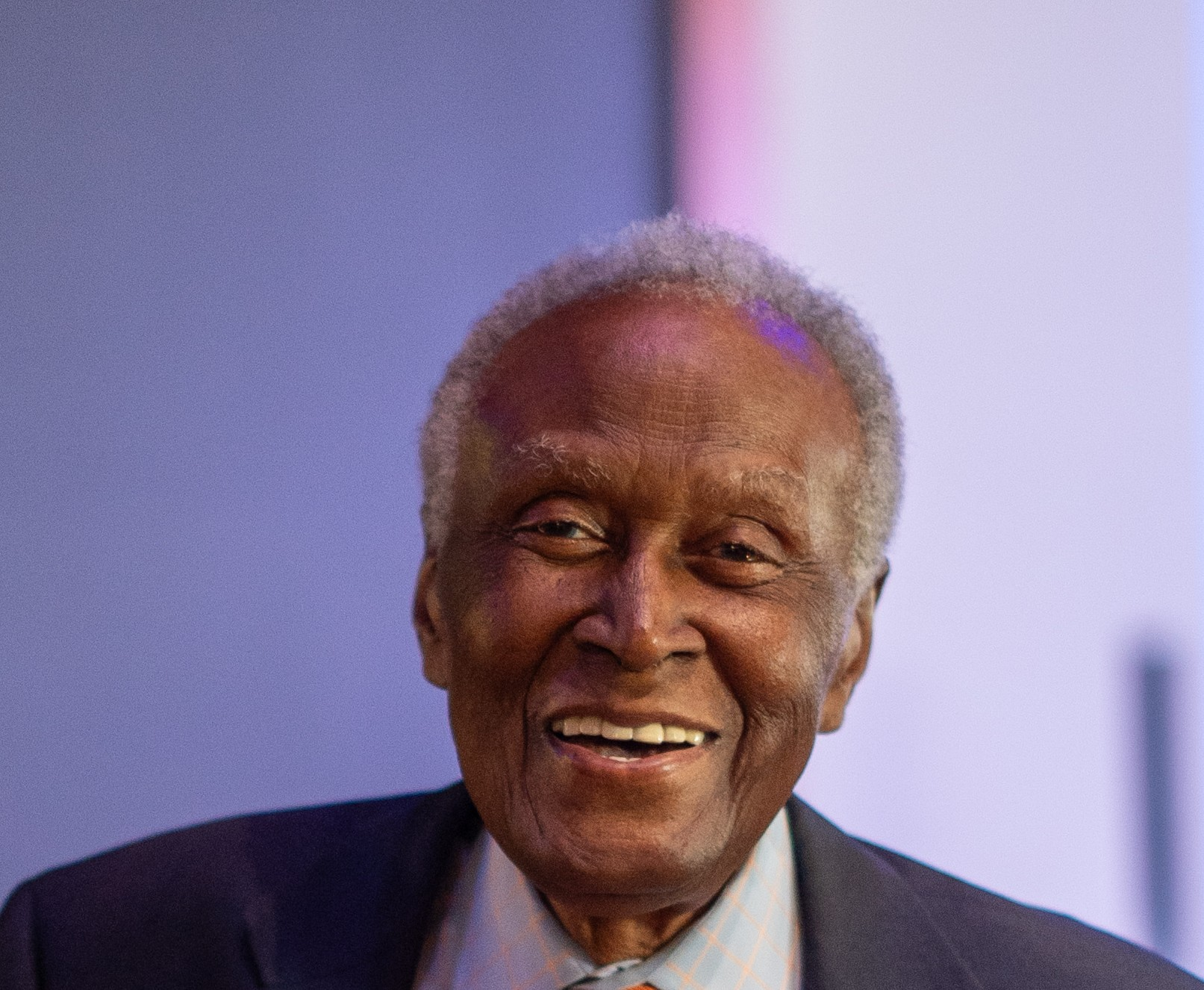
- Brooks in 2026

Mayor pro tem of Kansas City, Missouri
- In office 1999–2007

Member of the Kansas City Council for the 6th district at-large
- In office 1999–2007

President of the Kansas City Board of Police Commissioners
- In office 2010–2012

Personal details
- Born: May 3, 1932 (age 94) Humnoke, Arkansas, U.S.
- Party: Democratic
- Spouse: Carol Rich Brooks
- Children: 6
- Education: University of Missouri–Kansas City (BA, MA, Hon. PhD); Lincoln Junior College (AA)
- Website: Alvin L. Brooks

Alvin Brooks (born Alvin Lee Gilder; May 3, 1932) is an American civil rights activist, community leader, and retired KCPD officer and public official. His universally lauded career of more than seven decades has made him a key figure in Kansas City, Missouri, including as one of the city's first Black police officers in 1954, founder of the influential Ad Hoc Group Against Crime in 1977, and city councilman and mayor pro tem from 1999 to 2007. In the aftermath of the 1968 Kansas City riots sparked by the assassination of Martin Luther King Jr., Brooks was appointed to create and lead Kansas City's first Human Relations Department. As a public administrator, he became Assistant City Manager, and later ran for mayor of Kansas City. In 2010, he was appointed to the Kansas City Board of Police Commissioners, becoming its president.

Brooks has dedicated his life to violence prevention, criminal justice reform, and racial equity, working both within and outside of government. He has earned national recognition, including being named one of America's "Thousand Points of Light" by President George H. W. Bush, receiving the Harry S. Truman Public Service Award, and receiving the Kansas Citian of the Year award from the Greater Kansas City Chamber of Commerce in 2019. In his nineties, Brooks remains prominent in Kansas City, evidenced by his election to a public school board in 2024.

Kansas City leaders and civic media have called him "a powerful example of what genuine love of a community and its people can lead us to do", and "Kansas City's definitive civil servant". Academy Award-winning director of the 2024 PBS documentary, The Heroic True-Life Adventures of Alvin Brooks, said, "People in trouble with the law ask him for help, the police ask him for help, and politicians ... also come asking for help. All of those groups trust and respect him, which is amazingly rare."

== Early life and education ==
Alvin Lee Gilder was born on May 3, 1932, in Humnoke, Arkansas, to Thomascine Gilder and Wilbur Herring. As a baby, his mother sent him to live with Estelle and Cluster Brooks, who reportedly "took good care of" and adopted him, raising him in North Little Rock, Arkansas. He said his adoptive father was the area's only Black moonshine producer during alcohol prohibition in the United States, supplying to the sheriff who supplied the judge. He said his father was threatened at their home by a white man, shot the man to death, and was advised to leave the state to avoid a murder charge. Upon arriving in Kansas City, the family's house burned down, forcing them to live temporarily in a barn until finding a home in a poor, predominantly white neighborhood where he said "My mother fed all the kids, you know, all white kids". He grew up in the historic Dunbar-Leeds neighborhood, a small but fairly self-sufficient community of large community gardens and local business.

Brooks grew up in Kansas City during the Jim Crow era of national racial segregation, experiencing deeply pervasive and systemic racism, though recalling his childhood as mostly "fun". Brooks recounted one of the worst of the family's many traumatic incidents involving the KCPD, when an officer threatened to shoot 10-year-old Brooks unless he could run to the top of a hill, and fired and missed, after having falsely apprehended him for some white children's offense of throwing rocks at a dog.

He attended the city's segregated schools, including Dunbar Elementary and R.T. Coles Vocational High School. He earned an Associate of Arts degree from the historically black Lincoln Junior College in 1954. After being denied transfer admission to Rockhurst University, he enrolled at the University of Kansas City (now the University of Missouri–Kansas City), where he earned a Bachelor of Arts in History and Government in 1959 and a Master of Arts in Sociology in 1973. UMKC hosts a scholarship fund in his name, and awarded him an honorary Doctor of Philosophy degree in 2012.

== Career ==
=== Police and early community work (1954–1972) ===
In 1953, at age 21, Brooks joined the Kansas City Police Department (KCPD), becoming one of its first few Black police officers and the first to work out of the station at 27th and Van Brunt. In 2023, he recalled, "I don't know why I decided to become a police officer. [But then, we] decided we were going to be the vanguard of that community. We were going to make some changes." He said these Black officers were gratefully and respectfully received by the small Black community. During national Jim Crow racial segregation and Kansas City's mob rule, Black officers faced severe restrictions, where they could not patrol with white officers or arrest white suspects. He recalled, "I made them treat me with respect ... Because of how I carried myself." After a decade as a patrolman and detective without promotion, Brooks left the KCPD in 1964, citing the department's pervasive racism.

He then transitioned to community-focused roles, working for the Kansas City School District and the Neighborhood Youth Corps. Following the 1968 Kansas City riots that erupted from the assassination of Martin Luther King Jr., Mayor Ilus W. Davis appointed Brooks to establish and lead the city's new Human Relations Department. He became the first Black department director in Kansas City's history, which he held until 1972, tasked with easing racial tensions and addressing systemic discrimination. In 2023, he reflected that Mayor Davis's strategic report on the socioeconomic roots of that riot still remain in Kansas City.

=== City administration and Ad Hoc (1972–1991) ===
Brooks was appointed Assistant City Manager in 1972, which he held until 1991. In 1977, amid community fear over a series of unsolved murders and kidnappings, especially of Black women, Brooks founded the Ad Hoc Group Against Crime (AdHoc). He created it, originally named the "Ad Hoc Group Against Crime of Community Leaders and Representatives of the Black Community", to bridge between the community and law enforcement, improve police accountability, and help solve crimes. AdHoc was among the first organizations to define violence as a public health crisis. Its services grew to include grief counseling, a 24-hour crisis hotline, victim advocacy, witness relocation, and youth mentorship, along with prevention programs focused on cognitive behavioral therapy and conflict mediation. AdHoc's work gained national attention, including organizing marches that led to the closure of hundreds of crack houses during the crack epidemic in the United States.

=== Politics, police, and education (1999–present) ===
In 1999, Brooks was elected to the Kansas City Council as a representative for the 6th District at-large. That year, he ran for Mayor of Kansas City, losing by only 950 votes. Mayor Kay Barnes appointed him mayor pro tem, which he held for both of his terms on the council, from 1999 to 2007. He chaired the Public Safety Committee and was vice chair of the Finance and Audit Committee.

In 2010, Governor Jay Nixon appointed Brooks to the Kansas City Board of Police Commissioners, where he later served a two-year term as president. The appointment marked a full-circle moment, placing him in a civilian oversight role for the department he had left decades earlier due to racial discrimination. In 2024, at age 91, Brooks was elected to the Hickman Mills C-1 School District Board of Directors.

He holds a State of Missouri Lifetime Teacher's Certificate. He has been a reserve teacher and a visiting instructor at University of Missouri—Kansas City, Penn Valley Community College, and Pioneer Community College. He has served on many boards and committees, and has performed hundreds of lectures and motivational speeches.

=== National service and activism ===
From 1989 to 1992, Brooks served on the President's National Drug Advisory Council, appointed by President George H. W. Bush in recognition of AdHoc. Director of the Office of National Drug Control Policy, William Bennett, recognized Brooks as a "front-line soldier" in the nation's anti-drug efforts.

Brooks's activism began long before his government roles. He was an early chairman of the local chapter of the Congress of Racial Equality (CORE). He has conducted hundreds of workshops on topics such as racial diversity, police-community relations, and civil rights. In a 1970 article for The Kansas City Call titled "The American Racist System", he analyzed the structural nature of racism in the United States, an intellectual pursuit he has continued for decades.

== Reception ==
=== Leadership ===
Local leaders and institutions have lauded Alvin Brooks for his decades of servant leadership, his bridge-building across communities, and his moral integrity. At the groundbreaking for the Alvin Brooks Center for Faith-Justice, Rockhurst University President Sandra Cassady said, "Mr. Brooks has provided us a powerful example of what genuine love of a community and its people can lead us to do." In a letter quoted there, former Rockhurst President Rev. Thomas B. Curran wrote, "it is a blessing to now have your name aligned ... with the story it wishes to tell of a faith that does justice".

The civic press has echoed these sentiments. Flatland KC called him "a consummate example of servant leadership in the Jesuit tradition". Community Voice called him "a revered civic leader ... mentoring countless young people". KCUR called him "Kansas City's definitive civil servant".

=== Awards and honors ===
Brooks has received numerous awards for his public service. In 1990, President George H. W. Bush named him one of America's "Thousand Points of Light". The Greater Kansas City Chamber of Commerce named him Kansas Citian of the Year in 2019. In 2016, he received the Harry S. Truman Public Service Award, the highest award from the City of Independence, of which previous recipients include former presidents Jimmy Carter and Gerald Ford. That year, the Kansas City Council declared his birthday, May 3, as Alvin L. Brooks Day.

His alma mater, UMKC, named him Alumnus of the Year in 2009 and awarded him an Honorary Doctorate of Philosophy in 2012. The university hosts the Alvin Brooks scholarship for criminal justice majors. At Rockhurst University, which had once denied Brooks's transfer credits, the university trustees asked retired president Curran what he wanted to leave as his own legacy, and he requested building a justice center named after Alvin Brooks. Rockhurst began fundraising, and in 2022 broke ground on the $6 million Alvin Brooks Center for Faith-Justice.

== Personal life ==
In 1950, at age 18, Brooks married Carol Rich Brooks and they were together for 63 years until her death in 2013, having raised six children. He recalled her admonishment, "You take care of the community, I'll take care of the family." As of March 2025, he had 17 grandchildren and 41 great-grandchildren. Brooks is a converted Catholic and continues to reside in Kansas City.

== In media ==
In 2021, Brooks published his autobiography, Binding Us Together: A Civil Rights Activist Reflects on a Lifetime of Community and Public Service. It is the basis of the documentary film, The Heroic True-Life Adventures of Alvin Brooks (2024). The film was directed by Academy Award-winner Kevin Willmott and produced in collaboration with the University of Kansas and the Black Archives of Mid-America. Willmott compared Brooks to the fictional Black film hero Shaft, noting, "People in trouble with the law ask him for help, the police ask him for help, and politicians ... also come asking for help. All of those groups trust and respect him, which is amazingly rare." The film premiered in June 2024 and aired on Kansas City PBS in July 2024.

He is reportedly writing a second book aimed at middle-school students.

=== Publications ===
Brooks authored these publications.

- Brooks, Alvin (2021). Binding Us Together: A Civil Rights Activist Reflects on a Lifetime of Community and Public Service. Kansas City, Missouri: Andrews McMeel Publishing. ISBN 978-1524867768.
- Brooks, Alvin (February 12, 1970). "The American Racist System". The Kansas City Call.

== See also ==
- Jessie Jefferson, a fellow storied KC activist
- City workhouse castle, a historic institution of KC social justice
