= Nahru Lampkin =

- Born: Detroit, Michigan, U.S.
- Other name: Bongo Man
- Occupations: Musician, street performer, entrepreneur
- Years active: 1983–present

Nahru Lampkin, aka Bongo Man (born 1962), is an American entertainer, musician, street performer, and entrepreneur from Detroit, Michigan. He has two other jobs, but he is best known as a street performer who plays conga drums (referred to as bongo drums by his customers) near the entrance to sporting and other events, while offering rhymed comments to passers-by. He was born in Michigan in 1962.

Lampkin has been performing his "Bongo Man" act since 1983, when he started at Fisherman's Wharf in San Francisco. He has been performing at the University of Michigan's Saturday football games for more than 25 years, starting in 1988; ESPN described him as a "longtime and storied tradition" at Michigan games. He also performs at Michigan State University games, Detroit Tigers games, and events at Joe Louis Arena, Ford Field and Comerica Park. Since 1993 he has traveled to perform at the Kentucky Derby in Louisville, Kentucky and at Mardi Gras in New Orleans, Louisiana. When not performing he drives a taxicab (the "Bongo Man Taxi") and teaches robotics at YouthVille Detroit.
