= List of people from Michigan =

State flag of Michigan

Location of Michigan in the United States

This is a list of notable people from the U.S. state of Michigan. People from Michigan are sometimes referred to as Michiganders, Michiganians, or, more rarely, Michiganites. This list includes people who were born, have lived, or worked in Michigan.

== Actors, entertainers, and filmmakers ==
=== Directors, filmmakers, and producers ===
- Ford Beebe, director of films, including serials The Green Hornet and Buck Rogers (born in Grand Rapids)
- Mike Binder, director, screenwriter and actor, The Upside of Anger, Reign Over Me (born in Birmingham)
- John Randolph Bray, early film animator and producer (born in Addison)
- Jerry Bruckheimer, film and television producer, CSI: Crime Scene Investigation, Pirates of the Caribbean (born in Detroit)
- Matt Busch, writer and director, Aladdin 3477 (raised in Sterling Heights)
- Timothy Busfield, actor and television director, Lipstick Jungle, Without A Trace, Damages (born in Lansing)
- Bill Carruthers, television producer and director (born in Detroit)
- William Clemens, director of Nancy Drew and Perry Mason films (born in Saginaw)
- Kerry Conran, screenwriter and director, Sky Captain and the World of Tomorrow (born in Flint)
- Francis Ford Coppola, film director and screenwriter, The Godfather trilogy, Apocalypse Now (born in Detroit)
- Roger Corman, director and producer, The Little Shop of Horrors, The Wild Angels (born in Detroit)
- Gerald Di Pego, screenwriter and producer, Message in a Bottle (born in Flint)
- Paul Feig, film and television director, Bridesmaids (born in Mount Clemens)
- Robert J. Flaherty, filmmaker of Nanook of the North, first commercially successful documentary (born in Iron Mountain)
- Anne Fletcher, director, actress, and choreographer, The Proposal (born in Detroit)
- Loyal Griggs, Oscar-winning cinematographer (born in Sanilac County)
- Albert Hughes and Allen Hughes, film directors, producers, and screenwriters, Menace II Society (born in Detroit)
- John Hughes, director and writer, Ferris Bueller's Day Off, Home Alone (born in Lansing)
- Jake Kasdan, film and television director, Bad Teacher, Sex Tape (born in Detroit)
- Lawrence Kasdan, screenwriter and director, The Big Chill, Body Heat, Silverado, Wyatt Earp (educated in Ann Arbor)
- Jeff Katz, film producer, The Pope's Exorcist, Snakes On A Plane (born in Detroit)
- Lee H. Katzin, film and television director, Le Mans (born in Detroit)
- Woodie King Jr., stage and film director and producer (raised in Detroit)
- Neil LaBute, film director, screenwriter and playwright, In the Company of Men (born in Detroit)
- Mitchell Leisen, director, Death Takes a Holiday, Midnight (born in Menominee)
- Norman Z. McLeod, director, Horse Feathers, Topper, The Secret Life of Walter Mitty (born in Grayling)
- McG, film director, Charlie's Angels, Terminator Salvation (born in Kalamazoo)
- Michael Moore, Oscar-winning documentary filmmaker and writer (born in Flint)
- Robert Moore, director, Murder By Death, Chapter Two (born in Detroit)
- Jane Murfin, screenwriter, What Price Hollywood? (born in Quincy)
- Vincenzo Natali, director and screenwriter, Cube (born in Detroit)
- Joel Potrykus, director and screenwriter, Ape, Buzzard (born in Ossineke)
- Bill Prady, television writer and producer (born in Detroit)
- Richard Quine, director and producer, Bell, Book and Candle, Sex and the Single Girl (born in Detroit)
- Sam Raimi, director, screenwriter, producer, Spider-Man, television series Xena: Warrior Princess (born in Royal Oak)
- Gene Reynolds, Emmy Award-winning director, co-creator of M*A*S*H (raised in Detroit)
- Lloyd Richards, stage director, National Medal of Arts recipient (raised in Detroit)
- Terry Rossio, screenwriter and film producer (born in Kalamazoo)
- Leonard Schrader, screenwriter, Kiss of the Spider Woman, The Yakuza (born in Grand Rapids)
- Paul Schrader, director, screenwriter, American Gigolo, Blue Collar, Taxi Driver, Raging Bull (born in Grand Rapids)
- Robert Shaye, co-CEO of New Line Cinema (born in Detroit)
- Robert Tapert, producer of The Evil Dead, Timecop, Xena: Warrior Princess (born in Royal Oak)
- Paul Weatherwax, film editor, two-time Academy Award winner (born in Sturgis)
- Harry Winer, film and television director and producer (born in Detroit)

=== Radio and television people ===
- Byron Allen, comedian, television talk show host (born in Detroit)
- Tim Allen, actor and comedian, Home Improvement (lived in Birmingham)
- Gillian Anderson, actress, The X Files (lived and went to school in Grand Rapids)
- Sean Baligian, radio host at WDFN, pre and post game Detroit Lions (born in Livonia)
- Kristen Bell, actress, Veronica Mars (born in Huntington Woods)
- Elizabeth Berkley, actress, Saved by the Bell (born and raised in Farmington Hills)
- Sandra Bernhard, comedian and actress (born in Flint)
- Cam Brainard, radio and television announcer, narrator of Breed All About It on Animal Planet (born in Flint)
- Selma Blair, actress, Kath & Kim, Anger Management (born in Southfield)
- Bill Bonds, television journalist, WXYZ-TV (born in Pontiac)
- Dave Campbell, baseball player and broadcaster (born in Manistee)
- Dave Coulier, actor and stand-up comedian, Full House (born in St. Clair Shores)
- Jeff Daniels, actor, The Newsroom (grew up in Chelsea)
- Bob Eubanks, host of television game show The Newlywed Game (born in Flint)
- Paula Faris, correspondent for ABC News and The View (born in Jackson)
- Fred Foy, announcer, narrator of The Lone Ranger television series (born in Detroit)
- Cyndy Garvey, co-host with Regis Philbin on what later became Regis & Kathie Lee, ex-wife of Steve Garvey (born in Detroit)
- John Gordon, radio voice of Minnesota Twins (born in Detroit)
- Chris Hansen, television journalist (born in Chicago, but grew up in Michigan)
- Thom Hartmann, radio talk show host, author (born in Lansing)
- Ernie Harwell, radio broadcaster of Detroit Tigers baseball (1960–2002) (born in Georgia, lived in Novi)
- Mario Impemba, television broadcaster of Detroit Tigers baseball (born in Detroit)
- Art James, quiz show host and announcer (born in Dearborn)
- Jana Kramer, actress, One Tree Hill (born in Rochester Hills)
- Taylor Lautner, actor, Scream Queens (born in Grand Rapids)
- Casey Kasem, radio personality, host of American Top 40 (born in Detroit)
- James Lipton, host of Bravo cable television series Inside the Actors Studio, writer and poet (born in Detroit)
- Loni Love, comedian, featured on Chelsea Lately and I Love The '80s (born in Detroit)
- Bruce Martyn, radio broadcaster of Detroit Red Wings hockey (from Sault Ste. Marie)
- Greg Mathis, television judge (born in Detroit)
- J.P. McCarthy, radio personality, WJR (1960–1995) (born in New York)
- Ed McMahon, actor, announcer, The Tonight Show Starring Johnny Carson, sidekick to Carson (born in Detroit)
- Seth Meyers, comedian, Saturday Night Live cast member, host of Late Night with Seth Meyers
- Martin Milner, actor, starred in Route 66 and Adam-12 television shows (born in Detroit)
- George Noory, radio talk show host, Coast to Coast AM (born in Detroit, raised in Dearborn Heights)
- Carter Oosterhouse, television personality, Trading Spaces (born in Traverse City)
- Jack Paar, television talk show host, The Tonight Show (raised in and worked in Jackson)
- Van Patrick, sportscaster for Lions football and Tigers baseball in Detroit
- Arthur Penhallow, radio personality, WRIF (1970–2009) (born in Hawaii)
- Dick Purtan, longtime radio personality in Detroit area (lives in West Bloomfield)
- Gilda Radner, comedian and actress, Saturday Night Live (born in Detroit)
- Rob Rubick, football player and radio-TV commentator (born in Newberry)
- Tom Selleck, actor, star of 1980s hit TV show Magnum, P.I., producer, National Guard veteran (born in Detroit)
- Dax Shepard, actor, Parenthood (raised in Walled Lake and Milford)
- Ralph Story, radio and television personality (born in Kalamazoo)
- Katherine Timpf, television personality, reporter and comedian (born in Detroit)
- Lily Tomlin, comedian and actress, Rowan & Martin's Laugh-In (born in Detroit)
- Toni Trucks actress, Twilight Saga, SEAL Team (born in Grand Rapids, raised in Manistee)
- Willie Tyler, comedian and ventriloquist (raised in Detroit)
- Ty Tyson, sportscaster, voice of Detroit Tigers (1927–1953) (born in Pennsylvania, moved to Detroit)
- Kimberly Paigion Walker, radio and television personality, actress, host of 106 & Park (born in Oak Park)
- Ginger Zee, meteorologist for ABC News and Good Morning America (attended high school in Rockford)

=== Reporters, editors, photographers, and broadcasters ===
- Jim Bellows, newspaper editor, first managing editor of Entertainment Tonight (born in Detroit)
- Charles Collingwood, CBS television news correspondent (born in Three Rivers)
- Candy Crowley, CNN broadcast journalist (born in Michigan)
- Jill Dobson, Fox News entertainment correspondent (born in Quincy)
- Dick Enberg, sportscaster (born in Mount Clemens and raised in Armada)
- Joe Falls, sportswriter for Detroit newspapers (1956–2004) (born in New York, moved to Detroit)
- Paula Faris, correspondent for ABC News (born and raised in Jackson)
- Sara Ganim, correspondent for CNN (born in Detroit)
- Robin Givhan, fashion editor for the Washington Post (born in Detroit)
- Wendell Goler, Fox News senior White House and foreign affairs correspondent (raised in Jackson)
- Gael Greene, New York restaurant critic and author (born and raised in Detroit)
- Sanjay Gupta, chief medical correspondent for CNN (born in Novi)
- Jemele Hill, columnist and television personality for ESPN (born in Detroit)
- Gus Johnson, sportscaster for Fox Sports (born in Detroit)
- Jim Kaat, MLB Network sportscaster (born in Zeeland)
- Suzanne Malveaux, CNN reporter and White House correspondent (born in Lansing)
- Miles O'Brien, broadcast news journalist for PBS NewsHour (born in Detroit)
- Michael Parks, Pulitzer Prize-winning reporter and editor (both in Detroit)
- Steve Phillips, former ESPN baseball analyst (from Detroit)
- William E. Quinby, 19th-century editor and owner of the Detroit Free Press (born in Maine, moved to Detroit)
- Carl Quintanilla, anchor of the Sunday edition of Today and NBC Nightly News (born in Midland)
- Amy Robach, ABC news correspondent (born in St. Joseph)
- H.G. Salsinger, sports editor of Detroit News (1909–1958) (born in Ohio, moved to Detroit)
- Jay Schadler, ABC television news correspondent (born and raised in St. Joseph)
- Serena Shim, Lebanese-American journalist for Press TV (born in Detroit)
- Watson Spoelstra, sportswriter for the Detroit News 1945–73 (born in Grand Rapids)
- Mike Tirico, sportscaster for ESPN, NBC (lives in Ann Arbor)
- Lem Tucker, pioneering African-American two-time Emmy Award-winning news reporter (born in Saginaw)
- David Turnley, photojournalist and 1990 Pulitzer Prize winner (lives in Ann Arbor)
- Taro Yamasaki, photojournalist and 1981 Pulitzer Prize winner (born in Detroit)

=== Other ===
- Edgar Bergen, ventriloquist and actor (born in Chicago, raised in Decatur)
- Jessica Chobot, host, presenter, and actor (born in Buffalo, raised in Novi)
- John Heffron, comedian and winner of NBC's Last Comic Standing (born in Detroit)
- Jamie Hyneman, special effects expert on MythBusters (born in Marshall)
- Gregory Jbara, film, television and stage actor (born in Westland)
- Connie Kreski, model, Playboy magazine Playmate of the Year 1969 (born in Wyandotte)
- Lashonda Lester (died 2017), stand-up comedian
- Loretta Long, "Miss Susan" on PBS's Sesame Street (born and raised in Paw Paw)
- Bob Murawski, film editor (born in Detroit)
- Tariq Nasheed, conspiracy theorist (Detroit)
- Tyler Oakley, YouTuber, activist, and author (born in Jackson)
- TooTurntTony, social media personality (born in Commerce)
- Kristina and Karissa Shannon, twin sister models and Playboy Playmates (born in Ann Arbor)
- Kate Upton, model and actress, Sports Illustrated swimsuit issue "Rookie of the Year" 2011, cover model 2012 (born in St. Joseph)

== Architects ==
- Constance Abernathy, architect, jeweler, and associate of Buckminster Fuller (born in Detroit)
- Charles N. Agree, builder of Whittier Hotel and Grande Ballroom
- Marcus Burrowes, designer of Herman Strasburg House
- Emily Helen Butterfield, Michigan's first female licensed architect, artist and church architecture innovator (born in Algonac)
- C. Howard Crane, designer of Detroit's Fox Theater and Olympia Stadium (born in Connecticut, moved to Detroit)
- John M. Donaldson, 19th-century Detroit architect
- Alden B. Dow, architect and Dow Chemical heir, based in Midland
- Joseph N. French, designer of Detroit's Fisher Building
- Norman Bel Geddes, architectural industrial designer, aviation designer, and theatrical designer best known for the 1939 New York World's Fair pavilion Futurama he designed for General Motors (born in Adrian)
- Eric J. Hill, University of Michigan professor
- Albert Kahn, architect (born in Rhaunen, Germany; moved to Detroit)
- Louis Kamper, designed Cadillac Square Building and Book Cadillac Hotel
- William E. Kapp, designed The Players Club
- Florence Knoll, minimalist architect and furniture designer (born in Saginaw)
- John Lautner, Los Angeles-based architect (born in Marquette)
- Gordon W. Lloyd, British-born, Detroit-based architect, builder of many churches
- George D. Mason, designer of Detroit Masonic Temple and Detroit Yacht Club
- Charles Willard Moore, architect, leader of the humanistic architecture movement (born in Benton Harbor)
- S. Kenneth Neumann, designer of One Kennedy Square
- A.B. Pond and Irving Kane Pond, Chicago architects, builders of Hull House (born in Ann Arbor)
- Ralph Rapson, architect best known for the design of the original Guthrie Theater in Minneapolis (born in Alma)
- Harry J. Rill, designed Globe Tobacco Building
- Gino Rossetti, architect whose firm designed Ford Field and The Palace of Auburn Hills
- Matthew L. Rossetti, architect whose firm designed Detroit-area sports stadiums, son of Gino Rossetti
- Wirt C. Rowland, known for Guardian Building and Buhl Building (born in Clinton)
- Eero Saarinen, industrial designer (born in Finland, raised in Bloomfield Hills)
- Eliel Saarinen, known for art deco buildings, father of Eero Saarinen (lived in Bloomfield Hills)
- Victor Saroki, designed Royal Park Hotel
- Ossian Cole Simonds, late 19th-century landscape architect (born in Grand Rapids)
- Fred L. Smith, architect whose firm designed Comerica Park
- Minoru Yamasaki, architect, known for designing the World Trade Center (born in Seattle, later moved to Grand Rapids)

== Artists and artisans ==
=== Ceramists ===
- Horace Caulkins, known for Pewabic Pottery used to make architectural tiles
- Hoon Lee, ceramist and professor
- Tom Lollar, ceramist and professor of fine arts
- Diana Pancioli, ceramist, professor, and author
- Mary Chase Perry Stratton, known for Pewabic Pottery used to make architectural tiles

=== Fashion designers ===
- Tracy Reese, fashion designer (born in Detroit)
- Anna Sui, fashion designer (born in Detroit)

=== Illustrators ===
- Matt Busch, illustrator for Star Wars, Indiana Jones, Stranger Things (raised in Sterling Heights)
- Norman Bel Geddes, theatrical and industrial designer (Adrian)
- Jef Mallett, Wilbur Award-winning cartoonist and triathlete, Frazz (from Lansing)

=== Painters ===
- Mathias Alten, impressionist painter (from Grand Rapids)
- Frederick Stuart Church, 19th-century painter (born in Grand Rapids)
- E. Irving Couse, painter and founding member of the Taos artist colony (born in Saginaw)
- Robert Seldon Duncanson (1820–1871), painter, the 19th century's greatest Western landscape artist (Smithsonian Institution), buried in Monroe's historic Woodland Cemetery (born in NY, raised in Monroe)
- Frederick Carl Frieseke, impressionist painter (from Owosso)
- Ian Hornak, realist painter (born in Philadelphia, moved to Mount Clemens, then Detroit)
- Chase Langford, contemporary painter (born in Pontiac)
- Marie-Thérèse Lasselle (1735–1819), embroiderer, watercolorist (Detroit, Monroe)
- Hughie Lee-Smith, painter (born in Florida, moved to Detroit, attended Wayne State)
- Charles McGee, sculptor and painter (born in South Carolina, moved to Detroit)
- Gari Melchers, naturalism artist (born in Detroit)
- Ann Mikolowski, painter (born in Detroit)
- Julius Rolshoven, Santa Fe-based painter (born in Detroit)
- John Mix Stanley, 19th-century painter and portraitist; co-founder of forerunner to Detroit Institute of Arts (born in Canandaigua, New York; moved to Detroit)
- Kent Twitchell, muralist and painter (born in Lansing)
- Carol Wald, painter and illustrator (born in Detroit)
- Kurt Wenner, painter (born in Ann Arbor)
- Ezra Winter, muralist, born 1886, works include Canterbury Tales mural (1939), Library of Congress John Adams Building, Washington, D.C. and murals in Guardian Building, Detroit (born in Traverse City)

=== Photographers ===
- Talbert Abrams, "father of aerial photography" (born in Tekonsha)
- M.J. Alexander, American West photoessayist (born in Sault Ste. Marie)
- Louis James Pesha, pioneering marine photographer (born in Euphemia, Ontario, moved to Marine City)
- Bill Schwab, fine arts photographer (born in Detroit)
- Irakly Shanidze, advertising, fashion, portrait, fine arts photographer (living in Detroit)

=== Sculptors ===
- Michele Oka Doner
- Marshall Fredericks
- Julius T. Melchers
- Carl Milles
- Isamu Noguchi
- Corrado Parducci
- Carlo Romanelli
- Edward Wagner

== Astronauts and aviation pioneers ==
- Dominic A. Antonelli, astronaut (born in Detroit)
- Michael J. Bloomfield, astronaut (born in Flint, raised in Lake Fenton)
- William Boeing, aviation pioneer, founder of Boeing Company (born in Detroit)
- Roger B. Chaffee, astronaut (born in Grand Rapids)
- Edward Heinemann, aircraft designer responsible wholly or in part for 20 major military aircraft, including the A-4 Skyhawk, the F3D Skyknight, and the F4D Skyray (born in Saginaw)
- Augustus Moore Herring, aviation pioneer (lived in St. Joseph)
- Gregory Jarvis, astronaut and payload specialist; died in the explosion of the space shuttle Challenger (born in Detroit)
- Brent W. Jett, astronaut (born in Pontiac)
- Clarence L. "Kelly" Johnson, aircraft engineer and aeronautical innovator (born in Ishpeming)
- Iven Carl Kincheloe Jr., test pilot pioneer (born in Detroit; raised in Cassopolis)
- David Leestma, astronaut (born in Muskegon)
- Jerry M. Linenger, astronaut (born in Eastpointe)
- Charles Lindbergh, pioneer aviator (born in Detroit)
- Jack R. Lousma, astronaut (born in Grand Rapids)
- Nancy Harkness Love, World War II pilot, squadron commander and aviation training pioneer (born in Houghton)
- James McDivitt, astronaut (born in Chicago; moved to Jackson)
- Donald R. McMonagle, astronaut and Manager of Launch Integration at the Kennedy Space Center (born in Flint)
- Philip Orin Parmelee, aviation pioneer trained by the Wright brothers (born in Matherton; raised in Saint Johns)
- Harriet Quimby, aviation pioneer and first US woman to receive a pilot's license (born in Coldwater)
- Ralph Royce, flew the first US military air operation (in 1916 in Mexico), oversaw air commands from the 1920s to the 1940s (born in Marquette)
- Richard A. Searfoss, astronaut (born in Mount Clemens)
- Alfred V. Verville, aviation pioneer from Atlantic Mine; Michigan Aviation Hall of Fame, 1991 inductee; Pulitzer Trophy Race two-time winner; fellow of the Smithsonian Institution's National Air and Space Museum
- Alfred Worden, astronaut (born in Jackson)
- Fred Zinn, World War I aviator and aviation reconnaissance pioneer (born in Battle Creek)

== Business leaders and inventors ==
=== Automotive industry ===
- Mary Barra, CEO of General Motors (born in Waterford)
- David Dunbar Buick, founder of Buick Motor Company (born in Scotland; emigrated to Detroit where he founded his company; moved with firm to Flint)
- Roy D. Chapin, founder of Hudson Motor Car Company and US secretary of commerce (born in Lansing)
- Roy D. Chapin Jr., CEO and chairman of American Motors Company (born in Grosse Pointe)
- Louis Chevrolet, founder of Chevrolet motor company (born in Switzerland, lived and died in Detroit)
- Harlow Curtice, CEO and president of General Motors and 1955 Time magazine Man of the Year (born in Petrieville; raised in Eaton Rapids and began career in Flint)
- William Davidson, CEO of Guardian Industries, philanthropist and chairman of Palace Sports and Entertainment, which owns the Detroit Pistons of the NBA, the Detroit Shock of the WNBA, and the Tampa Bay Lightning of the NHL (born in Detroit)
- John DeLorean, automobile industry entrepreneur (born in Detroit)
- Horace Elgin Dodge, automobile manufacturing pioneer (born in Niles)
- John Francis Dodge, automobile manufacturing pioneer (born in Niles)
- William C. Durant, automobile industry pioneer (born in Boston, Massachusetts; moved to Flint and later Pontiac)
- Harley Earl, executive at General Motors, designer of the Corvette (born in Hollywood, California, worked in Detroit)
- Pete Estes, president of Pontiac, Chevrolet and General Motors (born in Mendon)
- Virgil Exner, automotive designer for Studebaker and Chrysler (born in Ann Arbor)
- Charles T. Fisher, president of Detroit's Fisher Body automotive
- Max M. Fisher, industrialist, philanthropist (born in Pittsburgh; raised in Salem, Ohio; moved as an adult to metro Detroit)
- Edsel Ford, automaker, president of Ford Motor Company, founder of Mercury autos (born in Detroit)
- Henry Ford, iconic automaker, founder of Ford Motor Company (born in Dearborn)
- Henry Ford II, automaker, president and CEO of Ford (born in Detroit)
- William Clay Ford Jr., automaker and owner of NFL's Detroit Lions (born in Detroit)
- William Clay Ford Sr., automaker, owner of Detroit Lions, chairman of Henry Ford Museum (born in Detroit)
- Lee Iacocca, CEO of Chrysler Corporation, television spokesman and author (born in Allentown, Pennsylvania; moved to Detroit)
- Semon Knudsen, auto executive, head of Pontiac (born in Buffalo, New York; moved to Detroit)
- William S. Knudsen, president of General Motors (born in Denmark, lived and died in Detroit)
- Henry M. Leland, machinist, inventor and engineer who founded Cadillac and Lincoln autos (born in Vermont; relocated to Detroit)
- Walter Lorenzo Marr, first chief engineer of Buick (born in Lexington)
- Bill Mitchell, created or influenced design of many General Motors models (born in Cleveland, lived and died in metro Detroit)
- Charles Stewart Mott, first American partner of General Motors, also mayor of Flint, Michigan (born in Newark, New Jersey, moved to Flint)
- John Najjar, auto designer, developed prototype for Ford Mustang (born in Omaha, Nebraska, moved to Dearborn)
- Charles W. Nash, auto pioneer, founder of Nash Motors (born in Illinois, moved to Mount Morris and Flint)
- Ransom E. Olds, auto manufacturer; founder of Oldsmobile (born in Geneva, Ohio, longtime resident of Lansing)
- Roger Penske, founder of Penske Corporation and the automobile racing team Penske Racing (born in Ohio; moved to Bloomfield Hills)
- Harold Arthur Poling, president, chairman and CEO of Ford Motor Co. (born in Troy)
- Irving Jacob Reuter, president of Oldsmobile
- Jack Roush, CEO/owner of Roush Racing NASCAR (born in Kentucky; lived in Ypsilanti before moving to North Carolina)
- Frederic L. Smith, one of the founders of Oldsmobile and General Motors (born in Lansing)
- Roger Smith, chairman and CEO of General Motors, subject of documentary Roger & Me (born in Ohio before moving to Detroit)
- Preston Tucker, automobile designer, entrepreneur (born in Capac)
- Childe Wills, auto pioneer, designer of Ford Model T (born in Fort Wayne, Indiana; moved to Detroit)

=== Computers, Internet, and high-tech industries ===
- Steve Ballmer, former Microsoft CEO (1999–2014); first person to be worth over a billion dollars based on stock options received as a corporate employee; owner of NBA's Los Angeles Clippers (born in Detroit)
- Jim Buckmaster, CEO of Craigslist (born in Ann Arbor)
- Dick Costolo, CEO of Twitter (born in Royal Oak)
- Tony Fadell, CEO of Nest Labs, "father of the iPod" (born in Detroit)
- William Hewlett, co-founder of Hewlett-Packard (born in Ann Arbor)
- Bill Joy, co-founder of Sun Microsystems and its former chief scientist (born in Farmington Hills)
- Peter Karmanos Jr., founder of Compuware
- Michael Kinsley, founding editor of Slate (born in Detroit)
- Jack McCauley, engineer, inventor and video game developer (born in Battle Creek)
- Kevin O'Connor, co-founder and CEO of Doubleclick Internet ad serving software company and advertising network (born in Detroit)
- Scott McNealy, co-founder of Sun Microsystems (alumnus of Cranbrook)
- Larry Page, entrepreneur, co-founder of and former CEO of Google search engine (born in East Lansing)

=== Food and food-service industry ===
- Mike Ilitch, owner and founder of Little Caesars Pizza, owner of Detroit Red Wings and Detroit Tigers (born in Detroit)
- Will Keith Kellogg, founder of Kellogg Company (born in Battle Creek)
- Tom Monaghan, founder of Domino's Pizza, former owner of Detroit Tigers (born in Ann Arbor)
- David M. Overton, founder and CEO of the Cheesecake Factory, Inc. (born in Detroit)
- C. W. Post, founder of Post Cereals, inventor of Grape-Nuts (born in Illinois, moved to Battle Creek)
- James Vernor, founder of Vernor's Company and creator of Vernor's Ginger Ale (born in Detroit)
- Hiram Walker, founder of Hiram Walker & Sons distillery (lived and buried in Detroit)

=== Furniture ===
- D. J. DePree, founder of Herman Miller office equipment company (raised in Zeeland)
- Max DePree, CEO of Herman Miller office equipment company from 1980 to 1987 (born in Zeeland)

=== Other business ===
- Sewell Avery, chairman of US Gypsum 1905–36, Montgomery Ward (born in Saginaw)
- James Anthony Bailey, circus showman, co-founder of the Ringling Brothers and Barnum and Bailey Circus (born in Detroit)
- Don Barden, cable company pioneer and casino investor (born in Detroit)
- Andrew "Andy" Beal, businessman, banking and real estate, founder and chairman of Beal Bank (born in Lansing)
- George Gough Booth, publisher (from Michigan)
- Bonnie Brennan, CEO of Christie's
- Walter Briggs Sr., manufacturer, Detroit Tigers owner 1919–52 (born in Ypsilanti)
- John W. Brown, CEO of Stryker Corporation from 1977 to 2004 (born in Tennessee, moved to Kalamazoo)
- Joseph Bruce, co-founder of Psychopathic Records, hip-hop singer and professional wrestler (born in Wayne)
- Leo Burnett, advertising firm founder (born in St. Johns)
- Wellington R. Burt, lumberman, industrialist, politician (Saginaw)
- Irving T. Bush, business leader, funded Bush House in London and Bush Terminal in Brooklyn
- Michael Cohrs, member of the board of Deutsche Bank (born in Midland)
- Adam E. Coffey, business executive
- Margaret P. Colvin, inventor of the Triumph Rotary Washer
- William Davidson, glass industry mogul, former owner of Detroit Pistons (born in Detroit)
- Richard DeVos, founder of Alticor and former president of Amway (born in Forest Hills in metro Grand Rapids)
- Herbert Henry Dow, inventor and one of the founders of the US chemical industry (born in Belleville, Ontario; moved to Midland)
- John Fetzer, owner of Michigan radio and television companies and Detroit Tigers (born in Indiana, moved to Michigan)
- Orville Gibson, founder of Gibson Guitar Corporation (born in Chateaugay, New York; moved to Kalamazoo)
- Daniel Gilbert, financier founder of online mortgage company Quicken Loans, owner of NBA's Cleveland Cavaliers (from Livonia)
- Arnold Gingrich, founder of Esquire magazine (born in Grand Rapids)
- Berry Gordy Jr., founder of Motown Records (born in Detroit)
- Joseph Lowthian Hudson, founder of Hudson's department store (born in England, moved to Detroit)
- Fred Knorr, radio executive, Detroit Tigers part-owner 1956–60 (born in Detroit)
- Sebastian S. Kresge, founder of K-Mart (born in Bald Mountain, Pennsylvania; moved to Detroit)
- Louis K. Liggett, founder of Rexall drug store chain (born in Detroit)
- Jerome D. Mack, president of Las Vegas hotels the Riviera and Dunes, founder of UNLV (born in Albion)
- Alexander Macomb, early 19th-century merchant and land owner (born in Ireland, moved to Michigan)
- William Macomb, 18th-century merchant and land owner (born in Ireland, moved to Michigan in 1755)
- Alex Manoogian, inventor, founder of Masco, philanthropist (born in Smyrna, Ottoman Empire; moved to Detroit)
- Harold Matson, literary agent, founder of the Harold Matson Company (born in Grand Rapids)
- Orville D. Merillat, founder of Merillat Kitchens, later Merillat Industries (born in Fulton Co., Ohio, moved to Adrian)
- Richard Merillat, entrepreneur, former CEO of Merillat Industries and philanthropist (from Adrian)
- Harry Mohney, founder of Deja Vu Showgirls (born in Durand)
- Frank Navin, owner of Detroit Tigers 1908–35 (born in Adrian)
- Edgar Prince, founder of the Prince Corporation (born in Holland)
- Erik Prince, founder and owner of Xe Services, formerly Blackwater Worldwide (born in Holland)
- Stephen M. Ross, founder and CEO of The Related Companies real estate firm, helped establish Ross School of Business at University of Michigan which bears his name, 95% owner of Miami Dolphins (born in Detroit)
- William Shell, physician and co-founder of Targeted Medical Pharma, Inc. (born in Detroit)
- Frank Stanton, early television executive, president of CBS from 1946 to 1972 (born in Muskegon)
- Wilbur F. Storey, 19th-century publisher and owner of the Detroit Free Press, other newspapers (born in Vermont, moved to Jackson)
- Homer Stryker, M.D., inventor of mobile hospital bed; founder of orthopedic implant and medical product maker Stryker Corporation (born in Athens)
- Jon Lloyd Stryker, architect of Stryker Corp.; founder of Arcus Foundation for gay/lesbian issues and ape conservation (born in Kalamazoo)
- Pat Stryker, co-owner of the Stryker Corp. (born in Kalamazoo; moved to Fort Collins, Colorado)
- William E. Upjohn, founder of The Upjohn Company (born in Kalamazoo)
- Frederick Upton, senior vice president of Whirlpool Corporation (born in Battle Creek)
- Louis Upton, founder of Whirlpool Corporation (born in Battle Creek)
- Joseph Utsler, co-founder of Psychopathic Records and hip-hop singer (born in Wayne)
- Jay Van Andel, co-founder of Alticor and Amway (born in Grand Rapids)
- Brad Wardell, president and CEO of Stardock software and computer game company (born in Texas, lives in Michigan)
- Garfield Wood, inventor, boat builder, hydroplane and motorboat pioneer (born in Iowa, moved to Detroit)
- Samuel Zell, real estate investor, publisher, philanthropist (born in Chicago, attended University of Michigan)

== Cartoonists, illustrators, and animators ==
- Glenn Barr, artist for DC Comics and the Ren And Stimpy animated television series
- Jim Benton, cartoonist and author (from metro Detroit area)
- T. Casey Brennan, comic book author for Vampirella, Creepy and Eerie (from Ann Arbor)
- J. Scott Campbell, co-founder of the Cliffhanger imprint of Wildstorm Productions co-creator of Danger Girl and Gen^{13} (born in East Tawas)
- Dave Coverly, syndicated cartoonist, Speed Bump comic strip (born in Plainwell)
- Dave Dorman, science-fiction and fantasy illustrator and animationist (born in Michigan)
- Bill Freyse, cartoonist known for Our Boarding House (born in Detroit)
- David S. Goyer, comic book writer and filmmaker, authored many issues of Justice Society of America and comic-based films including The Crow: City of Angels and Blade; co-wrote Batman Begins (born in Ann Arbor)
- Cathy Lee Guisewite, creator of Cathy comic strip (born in Dayton, Ohio; grew up in Midland)
- Butch Hartman, animator, producer, director for The Fairly OddParents (born in Highland Park, Michigan)
- Ed Emshwiller, animator, visual artist, and founder of CalArts Computer Animation Lab (born in Lansing)
- Al Jean, creator of The Critic, writer for The Simpsons and Family Guy (born in Farmington Hills)
- Geoff Johns, comic book writer, known primarily for his work with DC Comics (born in Detroit)
- Vincent Locke, comic book illustrator, best known for his work on Deadworld and A History of Violence (from metro Detroit area)
- Mike Manley, one of the main illustrators of DC Comics's Batman and co-creator of Marvel Comics's Darkhawk (born in Detroit)
- Winsor McCay, pioneer film animator and artist of comic strip Little Nemo in Slumberland (born in Spring Lake)
- William Messner-Loebs, comic book writer and artist (from Michigan)
- Dan Mishkin, comic book writer, co-creator of Amethyst, Princess of Gem World and Blue Devil
- Bill Morrison, cartoonist and illustrator; editor, principal writer and artist for Bongo Comics Group overseeing the Simpsons comic book family; director of Futurama (born in Lincoln Park)
- James O'Barr, creator of the comic book series The Crow (born in Detroit)
- Gary Reed, comic book writer and publisher of Caliber Comics (born in Detroit)
- Chris Savino, writer, animator, comic book artist, director for The Loud House (born in Royal Oak, Michigan)
- Jim Starlin, Marvel Comics illustrator and writer (born in Detroit)
- John Henry Striebel, 20th-century comic strip pioneer (born in Bertrand)
- Haddon Sundblom, commercial illustrator and artist; created Coca-Cola Santa (born in Muskegon)
- Craig Thompson, cartoonist and graphic novelist best known for Blankets (born in Traverse City)
- Jerry Van Amerongen, comic strip writer best known for his syndicated comic panel The Neighborhood (born in Grand Rapids)
- Sam Viviano, caricature artist and art director best known for his work in Mad magazine (born in Detroit)
- Larry Wright, two-time winner of the National Cartoonist Society Editorial Cartoon Award and creator of the comic strips Wright Angles, Motley, and Kit 'N' Carlyle (from Allen Park)

== Civil rights and suffrage leaders and abolitionists ==
- Irene Osgood Andrews, woman's rights advocate best known for her writings on the problems of women in industry (born in Big Rapids)
- Leonard Baker, abolitionist, American Congregational minister (born in Detroit)
- Olympia Brown, women's suffrage leader (born in Prairie Ronde)
- Blanche Moore Haines (1865–1944), physician; Michigan State chair of the National Woman Suffrage Association
- Pearl M. Hart, civil rights advocate and lawyer, activist for gay rights and the rights of immigrants (born in Traverse City)
- Erastus Hussey, abolitionist and leading Underground Railroad stationmaster (from Battle Creek)
- Viola Liuzzo, 1960s white civil rights advocate who was murdered by the Ku Klux Klan (born in California, Pennsylvania; moved to Detroit)
- Malcolm X, civil rights leader (born in Omaha, Nebraska; raised in Lansing)
- Katharine Dexter McCormick, biologist, woman suffrage leader and philanthropist (born in Dexter)
- Rosa Parks, civil rights activist (born in Tuskegee, Alabama; moved to Detroit)
- Lawrence Plamondon, co-founder of the White Panther Party, activist, and first hippie to be on the FBI's Most Wanted List (adopted and raised in Traverse City, active in Ann Arbor, now living in Barry County)
- Anna Howard Shaw, leader in the women's suffrage movement (raised in northern Michigan wilderness and moved to Big Rapids, Michigan for college)
- Sojourner Truth, abolitionist (lived in Battle Creek)
- Jonathan Walker, abolitionist and subject of John Greenleaf Whittier's poem "Man with the Branded Hand" (born in Cape Cod, Massachusetts; settled in Muskegon)

== Infamous Michiganders ==
- Jim Bakker, scandal-ridden televangelist (born in Muskegon)
- Abe Bernstein, Prohibition-era gangster (born in New York; moved to Detroit)
- Ivan Boesky, inside trader (born in Detroit)
- Tony Chebatoris (1899–1938), murderer, bank robber and the only person executed for a crime in Michigan's history
- Caryl Chessman (1921–1960), convicted robber and rapist who gained fame as a death row inmate (born in St. Joseph)
- John Norman Collins, "co-ed killer" (lived in Ypsilanti)
- Charles Coughlin (1891–1979), anti-Semitic, pro-Hitler priest (born in Hamilton, Ontario; moved to Birmingham)
- Hawley Harvey Crippen, murderer (and first criminal to be captured with the aid of wireless communication) (born in Michigan, caught in England)
- Leon Czolgosz (1873–1901), assassin of President William McKinley (born in Detroit)
- Sile Doty (1800–1876), burglar, horse thief (born in Vermont, spent later years in Michigan)
- May Dugas de Pallandt van Eerde (1869–1937), notorious con woman, raised in Menominee
- Andrew Kehoe (1872–1927), Bath School disaster bomber
- Jack Kevorkian, physician infamous for assisted suicides (born in Pontiac)
- Kwame Kilpatrick, incarcerated former Detroit mayor (born in Detroit)
- John List, mass murderer (born in Bay City)
- John Mitchell, conspiratorial attorney general during Watergate under President Richard Nixon (born in Detroit)
- Terry Nichols, Oklahoma City bombing co-conspirator (born in Michigan)
- The Purple Gang, 1920s organized crime group in Detroit
- Reed Slatkin, perpetrator of one of the largest Ponzi schemes in the United States since that conducted by Ponzi himself (born in Detroit)
- Eddie Slovik, last US soldier executed for desertion (born in Detroit, raised in Dearborn)
- Carolyn Warmus, murderer whose murder case led to comparisons to Fatal Attraction (born in Troy, grew up in Birmingham)
- Aileen Wuornos, murderer made famous as the subject of the 2003 film Monster starring Charlize Theron (born in Rochester)

== Inventors ==
- Thomas Edison, inventor, entrepreneur (born in Milan, Ohio; later settled in Port Huron)
- Robert Jarvik, medical inventor (born in Midland)
- Elijah McCoy, steam engine lubricator inventor; origin of the phrase "the real McCoy" (born in Ontario; moved to Ypsilanti)
- Sid Meier, "father of computer gaming," created the computer game Civilization and others (born in Ontario moved to Detroit)
- Ephraim Shay, inventor of the Shay locomotive (born in Sherman Township, Huron County, Ohio; moved to Harbor Springs)

== Labor leaders ==
- Leon E. Bates, labor leader (born in Carrollton, Missouri, moved to Detroit)
- Owen Bieber, labor leader (born in North Dorr, worked in Grand Rapids)
- Frank Fitzsimmons, labor leader (born in Pennsylvania, moved at 16 to Detroit)
- Douglas A. Fraser, labor leader (born in Glasgow, Scotland; raised in Detroit)
- James P. Hoffa, labor leader (born in Detroit)
- James R. Hoffa, labor leader (born in Indiana, moved to Lake Orion)
- Joseph Labadie, labor leader, political activist (born in Paw Paw)
- Walter Reuther, labor leader (born in Wheeling, West Virginia; moved to Detroit; died in Pellston)
- Leonard Woodcock, labor leader (born in Providence, Rhode Island; raised in Detroit)

== Military figures ==
- Christopher C. Augur, commanding officer of Union Army XXII Corps (ACW) at Battle of Plains Store in Civil War (born in New York, settled in Michigan)
- Remi A. Balduck, World War II naval hero (born in Detroit)
- Frank Dwight Baldwin, major general in US Army, twice awarded Medal of Honor; served in Civil War, Indian Wars, Spanish–American War and Philippine–American War (born in Manchester)
- Harry Hill Bandholtz, US brigadier general in World War I, head of US Military Mission to Hungary (born in Constantine)
- Joseph Beyrle, only soldier to have served in both US Army and Soviet Army in World War II (born in Muskegon)
- Ronald A. Burdo, World War II US Marine Corps hero for whom high speed transport USS Burdo (APD-133) was named (born in Cheboygan)
- George H. Cannon, first US Marine to receive Medal of Honor in World War II (born in Webster Groves, Missouri; raised in Detroit)
- Lewis Cass, US secretary of war, secretary of state, brigadier general in War of 1812, 1848 Democratic Party presidential nominee, governor of Michigan Territory (born in New Hampshire; moved to Michigan when appointed governor)
- William R. Charette, Korean War US Navy hospital corpsman who selected Unknown Soldier of World War II (born in Ludington)
- Ferdinand J. Chesarek, US Army general who served as Comptroller of the Army (born in Calumet)
- John G. Coburn, Four-star general, commander US Army Materiel Command (born in Ypsilanti)
- George Armstrong Custer, US general, born in New Rumley, Ohio; moved to Monroe)
- Hugh A. Drum, US general who fought in Philippine–American War and World War I, later chief of staff of First United States Army, AEF (born in Fort Brady)
- Sarah Emma Edmundson, Union spy and (disguised as a man) soldier (born in Magaguadavic Settlement, New Brunswick, Canada; moved to Flint)
- Daniel Ellsberg, military analyst, known for releasing Pentagon Papers (grew up in Detroit)
- Anna Etheridge (aka Michigan Annie), Civil War nurse enlisted with Michigan 2nd Infantry; active in nearly every major battle; awarded Kearney Cross for bravery at Battle of Chancellorsville (born in Wayne County)
- Elon J. Farnsworth, Union Army cavalry general in Civil War, killed at Battle of Gettysburg (born in Green Oak)
- Aubrey Fitch, US Navy admiral (born in Saint Ignace)
- Douglas Harold Fox, World War II naval hero killed at Guadalcanal (born in Walled Lake)
- Ben Hebard Fuller, commandant of the Marine Corps (born in Big Rapids)
- Duane D. Hackney, Vietnam War US Air Force hero (born in Flint)
- Francis P. Hammerberg, United States Navy diver who was awarded Medal of Honor (born in Daggett)
- Henry Moore Harrington, officer in the US 7th Cavalry Regiment who died with George Armstrong Custer at Battle of Little Big Horn (born in Albion, New York; moved as child to Coldwater
- Thomas C. Hart, US Navy director of submarines in World War I, US Navy admiral in World War II and later senator from Connecticut (born in Davison)
- Micki King, Air Force colonel and Olympic gold-medalist diver (born in Pontiac)
- Frank Knox, secretary of the Navy under Franklin Delano Roosevelt, 1936 Republican vice-presidential candidate and newspaper owner (born in Boston, Massachusetts; moved to Grand Rapids)
- William S. Knudsen, US Army general during World War II, General Motors president (born in Denmark, lived and died in Detroit)
- Aleda E. Lutz, Army flight nurse during World War II, second-most decorated woman in American military history (born in Freeland, Michigan; died in Mont Pilat, France)
- Alexander Macomb, commanding general of the United States Army from 1828 to 1841 (born in Detroit)
- Montgomery M. Macomb, brigadier general (born in Detroit)
- William H. Macomb, commander in US Navy during Civil War (born in Detroit)
- Robert Neller, commandant of the Marine Corps (born in Louisiana, grew up in East Lansing)
- James Joseph Raby, rear admiral, USN (born in Bay City)
- Karl W. Richter, youngest pilot in Vietnam War to shoot down MiG in air-to-air combat, winner of Air Force Cross, Distinguished Flying Cross, and Purple Heart (born in Holly)
- Dean Rockwell, D-Day hero, coach of Greco-Roman wrestling team at 1964 Summer Olympics and Albion College football coach (born in rural Cass County)
- William Rufus Shafter (1835–1906) Union Army officer and major general in the Spanish-American War (born in Galesburg)
- Frederick C. Sherman, World War II US Navy admiral (born in Michigan)
- Oliver Sipple, marine who saved President Gerald Ford's life during a 1975 assassination attempt (born in Detroit)
- Willard J. Smith, United States Coast Guard commandant (born in Suttons Bay)
- Carl W. Weiss, World War II US Marine Corps hero who was killed in action at Guadalcanal (born in Detroit)
- Donald W. Wolf, World War II US Marine Corps hero who was killed in action at Guadalcanal (born in Hart)

== Musicians and composers ==
=== Classical ===
- Joseph Alessi, trombonist (born in Detroit)
- Robert Ashley, opera composer (born in Ann Arbor)
- Theodore Baskin, principal oboist of the Montreal Symphony Orchestra (born in Detroit)
- William Bolcom, Grammy and Pulitzer Prize-winning pianist and composer (born in Seattle; moved to Ann Arbor)
- David DiChiera, director of the Detroit Opera House's Michigan Opera Theatre
- Maria Ewing, operatic soprano (born in Detroit)
- John S. Hilliard, composer (born in Hot Springs, Arkansas; lived in Interlochen)
- Angela Jia Kim, pianist (born in East Lansing)
- Robert Longfield, composer (born in Grand Rapids)
- David Ott, composer (born in Kalamazoo)
- Elizabeth Parcells, operatic soprano (born in Detroit; retired in Grosse Pointe Farms)
- Roger Reynolds, composer, Pulitzer Prize winner (born in Detroit)
- Leo Sowerby, organist, composer, Pulitzer Prize winner (born in Grand Rapids)
- Thomas Schippers, conductor of the Metropolitan Opera and the Cincinnati Symphony Orchestra (born in Kalamazoo)
- George Shirley, tenor, National Medal of Arts recipient (born in Indianapolis; raised in Detroit)
- Joseph Silverstein, violinist and concertmaster of Boston Symphony Orchestra (born in Detroit)
- Cheryl Studer, dramatic soprano (born in Midland)
- David Weber, clarinetist (born in Vilna, Lithuania; raised in Detroit)

=== Jazz and blues ===
- Pepper Adams, jazz baritone saxophonist (born in Highland Park)
- Geri Allen, jazz pianist (born in Detroit)
- Dorothy Ashby, jazz harpist (born in Detroit)
- Anita Baker, jazz and R&B singer (born in Toledo, Ohio; raised in Detroit)
- Marcus Belgrave, jazz trumpeter (born in Detroit)
- The Bluescasters, blues group (formed in Ann Arbor)
- Kenny Burrell, jazz guitarist (born in Detroit)
- Donald Byrd, jazz trumpeter (born in Detroit)
- Betty Carter, Grammy Award-winning jazz vocalist (born in Flint)
- Regina Carter, jazz violinist (born in Detroit)
- James Carter, jazz woodwind player (born in Detroit)
- Ron Carter, jazz bassist and member of the Miles Davis Quintet (born in Ferndale)
- Bob Chester, jazz saxophonist and big band leader (born in Detroit)
- Alice Coltrane, jazz keyboardist, harpist and composer (born in Detroit)
- Xavier Davis, jazz pianist (born in Grand Rapids)
- Clare Fischer, jazz, bossa nova, and Afro-Cuban jazz keyboardist, composer, and bandleader (born in Durand)
- Tommy Flanagan, jazz pianist best known as Ella Fitzgerald's accompanist (born in Detroit)
- Kenny Garrett, jazz saxophonist (born in Detroit)
- Barry Harris, bebop jazz pianist and educator (born in Detroit)
- Joe Henderson, jazz saxophonist (born in Lima, Ohio; moved to Detroit)
- Milt Jackson, jazz vibraphonist (born in Detroit)
- Elvin Jones, jazz drummer of the hard bop era, part of John Coltrane's quartet (born in Pontiac)
- Hank Jones, jazz pianist, National Medal of Arts recipient (born in Vicksburg, Mississippi, grew up in Pontiac)
- Isham Jones, 1920s bandleader, violinist, saxophonist and songwriter (born in Coalton, Ohio, grew up in Saginaw)
- Thad Jones, jazz trumpeter (born in Pontiac)
- Earl Klugh, Grammy Award-winning jazz guitarist (born in Detroit)
- Yusef Lateef, jazz saxophonist and flutist (born in Chattanooga, Tennessee; raised in Detroit)
- Father Norman O'Connor (1921–2003), priest, jazz aficionado, writer, radio and television host (born in Detroit)
- Sy Oliver, trumpeter and bandleader (born in Battle Creek)
- Dave Pike, jazz vibraphonist (born in Detroit)
- Dianne Reeves, jazz vocalist and only person to have won the Grammy Award for "Best Jazz Vocal Performance" three times in a row (born in Detroit)
- Frank Rosolino, jazz trombonist (born in Detroit)
- Sonny Stitt, jazz saxophonist (born in Boston, Massachusetts; raised in Saginaw)
- Art Van Damme, jazz accordionist (born in Norway)
- Sippie Wallace, blues singer (born in Houston, later settled in Detroit)
- Rudy Weidoeft, jazz saxophonist (born in Detroit)
- Lyman Woodard, jazz organist

=== Motown, R&B, and soul music ===
- Florence Ballard, Motown-era singer, original lead singer of The Supremes, inductee Rock and Roll Hall of Fame (born in Mississippi; raised in Detroit)
- Oliver Cheatham, contemporary R&B singer (born in Detroit)
- Lamont Dozier, Motown-era composer, member of Holland-Dozier-Holland (born in Detroit)
- Dwele, soul singer, songwriter and record producer (born in Detroit)
- The Four Tops, Motown-era group with two No. 1 hits, Rock and Roll Hall of Fame (formed in Detroit)
- Aretha Franklin, singer, "The Queen of Soul", Rock and Roll Hall of Fame (born in Memphis, Tennessee; raised in Detroit)
- Matt Giraud, piano player, drummer, R&B, soul & blues singer; American Idol top 5, season 8 (born in Dearborn; raised in Ypsilanti; Western Michigan University graduate)
- Al Green, soul & gospel singer and pastor, Rock and Roll Hall of Fame (grew up in Grand Rapids)
- Brian Holland, Motown-era composer, member of Holland-Dozier-Holland (born in Detroit)
- Edward Holland Jr., Motown-era composer, member of Holland-Dozier-Holland (born in Detroit)
- Adina Howard, R&B singer (born in Grand Rapids)
- Mable John, first female singer to sign with Berry Gordy (born in Bastrop, Louisiana; raised in Detroit)
- The Jones Girls, R&B trio (born in Detroit)
- LaKisha Jones, contestant on American Idol (born in Flint)
- Jr. Walker & the All-Stars, Motown-era group whose song "Shotgun" was a No. 1 hit (formed in Battle Creek)
- Kem, R&B and soul singer (raised in Detroit)
- Bettye LaVette, soul singer (born in Muskegon)
- Barbara Lewis, singer known for hits "Baby I'm Yours" and "Hello Stranger" (born in South Lyon)
- The Marvelettes, Motown-era group whose "Please Mr. Postman" was a No. 1 hit (formed in Inkster)
- Queen Naija, R&B singer
- Freda Payne, Motown-era singer known for "Band of Gold" (born in Detroit)
- Martha Reeves, lead singer of Motown group Martha and the Vandellas, Rock and Roll Hall of Fame (born in Eufaula, Alabama; raised in Detroit)
- Smokey Robinson, Motown-era singer, Rock and Roll Hall of Fame (born in Detroit)
- Diana Ross, lead singer of The Supremes and solo artist, Rock and Roll Hall of Fame (born in Detroit)
- The Spinners, R&B group whose hits included "Could It Be I'm Falling in Love" (formed in Ferndale)
- The Temptations, Motown group, three Grammy awards with 14 No. 1 hits, Rock and Roll Hall of Fame (begun in Detroit)
- Edwin Starr, soul music singer, best known for his anti-war No. 1 hit "War" (born in Nashville, raised in Cleveland, lived in Detroit)
- Mary Wells, Motown-era singer best known for her No. 1 hit song "My Guy" (born in Detroit)
- Kim Weston, Motown and R&B singer (born in Detroit; currently lives in Israel)
- Jackie Wilson, R&B singer, Rock and Roll Hall of Fame (born in Detroit)
- BeBe Winans, R&B and gospel singer (born in Detroit)
- Stevie Wonder, singer, musician, songwriter and winner of 24 Grammy awards, Rock and Roll Hall of Fame (born in Saginaw)
- Philippe Wynne, R&B and gospel singer (born in Detroit)

=== Rock, rap, and pop ===
- 42 Dugg, rapper
- Aaliyah, singer and actress (born in Brooklyn, New York; raised in Detroit)
- Maurice Ager, producer (born in Detroit)
- Gregg Alexander, singer-songwriter (from Grosse Pointe)
- Anybody Killa, rapper (raised in Detroit)
- Hank Ballard, early rock musician best known for "The Twist" (born in Detroit)
- Andrew Bazzi, singer, songwriter (born in Dearborn, raised in Canton Township, attended Plymouth-Canton Educational Park)
- Big Sean, rapper (raised in Detroit)
- The Black Dahlia Murder, melodic death metal/metalcore band (begun in Detroit)
- Blaze Ya Dead Homie, rapper (raised in Romeo)
- Bliss 66, pop band (from Taylor)
- Sonny Bono, singer-songwriter, record producer and politician (born in Detroit)
- Kellin Quinn Bostwick, lead singer of Sleeping with Sirens (raised in Whitehall)
- Donald Brewer, drummer for Grand Funk Railroad (born in Flint)
- Danny Brown, rapper (born in Detroit)
- Rob Cantor, singer-songwriter and guitarist for rock band Tally Hall (born in Bloomfield Hills)
- Shana Cleveland, guitarist and vocalist (born in Kalamazoo)
- Alice Cooper, musician, 2011 inductee in Rock and Roll Hall of Fame (born in Detroit)
- Marshall Crenshaw, musician (born in Detroit)
- DDG, rapper (born in Pontiac)
- J Dilla (James Dewitt Yancey), hip hop producer (born in Detroit)
- Eminem, rapper (born in St. Joseph, Missouri; raised in Warren)
- Esham, rapper (born in Long Island, New York; raised in Detroit)
- Every Avenue, pop band (from Marysville)
- Factory 81, rock band (from Detroit)
- Mark Farner, lead singer of Grand Funk Railroad (born in Flint)
- Doug Fieger, lead singer of The Knack and co-writer of "My Sharona" (from Detroit)
- Fireworks, pop-punk band (begun in Metro Detroit)
- Glenn Frey, founding member of The Eagles, 2008 inductee in Rock and Roll Hall of Fame (born in Royal Oak)
- Craig Frost, keyboardist (born in Flint)
- Bob Gentry, singer-songwriter (born in Detroit)
- Greta Van Fleet, rock band (began in Frankenmuth)
- James Gurley, rock guitarist (born in Detroit)
- Bill Haley, 1950s musician, 1987 inductee in Rock and Roll Hall of Fame (born in Highland Park)
- Mayer Hawthorne, singer, producer, songwriter, DJ, rapper and multi-instrumentalist (born in Ann Arbor)
- I See Stars, electronicore band (formed in Warren)
- Insane Clown Posse, hip hop group (formed in Detroit)
- Billy Jones, lead guitarist, singer-songwriter for The Outlaws (born Ann Arbor)
- Maynard James Keenan, frontman of Tool and A Perfect Circle (born in Ravenna, Ohio, raised in Scottville)
- Kid Rock, musician (born in Romeo; raised in Mount Clemens)
- Anthony Kiedis, lead singer, Red Hot Chili Peppers (born in Grand Rapids)
- Wayne Kramer, guitarist (born in Detroit)
- DeJ Loaf, rapper (born in Detroit)
- Madonna, singer, inductee in Rock and Roll Hall of Fame (born in Bay City; raised in Pontiac and Rochester Hills)
- MC5, protopunk band (begun in Lincoln Park)
- Yuno Miles, rapper
- Guy Mitchell, pop singer known for "Singing the Blues", "Heartaches by the Number" (born in Detroit)
- Natas, hip hop group (begun in Detroit)
- Jason Newsted, bassist for Metallica (born in Battle Creek)
- NF, hip-hop/rapper (born in Gladwin, Michigan)
- Matt Noveskey, bassist for Blue October
- Ted Nugent, musician, activist (born in Detroit)
- Craig Owens, vocalist of the band Chiodos (from Davison)
- Daniel Passino, musician, contemporary R&B and pop singer-songwriter; contestant on NBC's The Voice season 10 (born in New Boston)
- Britta Phillips, singer-songwriter (from Boyne City)
- Pop Evil, rock band (began in Muskegon)
- Iggy Pop, rock musician, 2010 inductee in Rock and Roll Hall of Fame (born in Muskegon)
- Mike Posner, musician, synthpop and electropop singer-songwriter (born in Detroit)
- Suzi Quatro, singer, bassist, and actress (born in Detroit)
- Question Mark & the Mysterians, rock band (begun in Bay City)
- The Romantics, new wave rock band (begun in Detroit)
- Royce da 5'9", rapper (born in Detroit)
- Mitch Ryder, rock musician known for "Devil with a Blue Dress On" (born in Hamtramck)
- Bob Schneider, Texas-based rock musician (born in Ypsilanti)
- Bob Seger, singer, 2004 inductee in Rock and Roll Hall of Fame (born in Dearborn; raised in Ann Arbor)
- Del Shannon, singer, 1999 inductee in Rock and Roll Hall of Fame (born in Coopersville)
- Chad Smith, drummer, Red Hot Chili Peppers (raised in Bloomfield Hills)
- Sponge, post-grunge band (begun in Detroit)
- Wayne Static, singer for Static-x (born in Muskegon)
- Still Remains, metalcore band (begun in Grand Rapids)
- The Stooges, rock band, 2010 inductees in Rock and Roll Hall of Fame (begun in Ann Arbor)
- Tally Hall, rock band (formed in Ann Arbor)
- Taproot, nu metal band (begun in Ann Arbor)
- Thought Industry, progressive metal band (begun in Kalamazoo)
- Twiztid, hip hop group (begun in Eastpointe)
- Uncle Kracker, rock musician (born in Mount Clemens)
- The Verve Pipe, post-grunge band (formed in East Lansing)
- The Von Bondies, indie rock/alternative band (from Detroit)
- Andrew W.K., metal/hard rock composer (born in Ann Arbor)
- Narada Michael Walden, multi-platinum record producer and songwriter (born in Kalamazoo)
- Malaya Watson, American Idol contestant (from Southfield)
- We Came as Romans, melodic metal core band (from Troy)
- Jack White, singer-songwriter (born in Detroit; raised in Detroit and Kalamazoo)
- Meg White, drummer and Grammy Award winner (born in Grosse Pointe Farms)
- The White Stripes, minimalist blues-rock duo (begun in Detroit)
- Joyce Vincent Wilson, singer with Tony Orlando and Dawn (born in Detroit)
- D'arcy Wretzky, bass player for The Smashing Pumpkins (born in South Haven)

=== Other musicians ===
- The Accidentals, alternative-rock band (formed in Traverse City)
- Roy Bargy, musician, composer, Jimmy Durante bandleader (born in Newaygo)
- Muruga Booker, drummer (born in Detroit, lives in Ann Arbor)
- Ralston Bowles, folk musician, singer/songwriter (lives in Grand Rapids)
- William David Brohn, Tony Award-winning orchestrator and arranger (born in Flint)
- Hughie Cannon, songwriter, "Won't You Come Home Bill Bailey" (born in Detroit)
- Erika Costell, YouTuber, model, and singer (born in Bedford)
- Johnny Desmond, big-band singer and recording artist (born in Detroit)
- Harlan Howard, songwriter in Country Music Hall of Fame (born in Detroit)
- Marion Hutton, singer with Glenn Miller orchestra (raised in Battle Creek)
- Herb Jeffries, singer (born in Detroit)
- Mary Kaye, guitarist (born in Detroit)
- Bernie Krause, pioneer in Moog synthesizers and folk singer with The Weavers (born in Detroit)
- Joseph LoDuca, film score composer (born in Michigan)
- John Lowery, guitarist, a.k.a. John5, former member of Marilyn Manson (born in Grosse Pointe)
- Stephen Lynch, comic musician (born in Abington, Pennsylvania; raised in Saginaw)
- Geoff Moore, Christian contemporary music Grammy-winning singer and songwriter (born in Michigan)
- Carrie Newcomer, folk musician (born in Dowagiac)
- Karen Newman, singer and anthem voice of Detroit Red Wings hockey (raised in Rochester)
- Zeena Parkins, avant garde harpist (born in Detroit)
- Rodriguez, singer, songwriter, subject of film Searching for Sugar Man (born in Detroit)
- James Royce Shannon, composer (born in Adrian, lived in Detroit)
- Sycamore Smith, folk singer (born in Marquette)
- Tom Smith, filker, folk musician (lives in Ann Arbor)
- Sufjan Stevens, folk musician (born in Detroit)
- Noel Stookey, "Paul" of Peter, Paul and Mary folk group (born in Baltimore, raised in Birmingham)
- Bob Vincent, big-band singer (born in Detroit)
- Margaret Whiting, singer and recording artist (born in Detroit)
- CeCe Winans, gospel singer (born in Detroit)
- Vickie Winans, gospel singer (born in Detroit)
- George Winston, Grammy Award-winning new age pianist (born in Michigan)
- Margaret Young, singer (born in Detroit)

== Native-American leaders ==
- Andrew Blackbird, Ottawa leader, historian and negotiator in Treaty of 1855 (born in Harbor Springs)
- Match-E-Be-Nash-She-Wish (or Bad Bird), Potawatomi chief (from Michigan)
- Mecosta, Potawatomi chief, for whom Mecosta County is named (born near present-day Big Rapids)
- John Okemos, Ojibwa chief, for whom the city of Okemos is named, signer of Treaty of Saginaw (born on Apple Island in present-day West Bloomfield)
- Simon Pokagon, Potawatomi chief, from whom Western Michigan's Pokagon Potawatomi take their name (born in Berrien County, settled in Hartland)
- Pontiac, Native American chief and war leader (born near Detroit River)
- Shavehead, Potawatomi chief and warrior (born in Cass County)
- Shaw-shaw-way-nay-beece, Ojibwa chief and signer of Treaty of 1855 (born in Isabella County)
- Wawatam, Ojibwa chief at Michilimackinac (born near Mackinaw City)
- Wosso (also called Owosso), for whom the city of Owosso is named), chief of Shiawassee band of Ojibwa and signer of Treaty of Saginaw (born near present-day Owosso)

== Political figures ==
=== National political figures ===
- Spencer Abraham, US senator 1995–2001 and secretary of energy 2001–05 (born in East Lansing)
- Henry B. Brown, US Supreme Court justice from 1891 to 1906 and author for court opinion in Plessy v. Ferguson (born in South Lee, Massachusetts; settled and practiced law in Detroit)
- Jesse Brown, US secretary of Veterans Affairs under President Bill Clinton (born in Detroit)
- Wilber M. Brucker, US secretary of the army 1955–61 and governor of Michigan 1931–33 (born in Saginaw)
- Dr. Ben Carson, US secretary of Housing and Urban Development, retired neurosurgeon, 2016 presidential candidate (born in Detroit)
- Roy D. Chapin Sr., US secretary of commerce under President Franklin Delano Roosevelt (born in Lansing)
- Betsy DeVos (born 1958), US secretary of education under President Donald Trump (born in Holland)
- Donald M. Dickinson, United States postmaster general of 19th century (born in New York, lived and died in Detroit)
- Thomas W. Ferry, United States senator 1871–1883, president pro tempore of the United States Senate 1875–1879
- Betty Ford, First Lady of the United States 1974–77; advocate of breast cancer early detection and chemical dependency treatment (born in Chicago; raised in Grand Rapids)
- Gerald Ford, US representative and 38th president of the United States (born in Omaha, Nebraska; raised in Grand Rapids)
- Jennifer Granholm, 47th governor of Michigan (born in Canada; raised in California; Northville resident at time of her election), US secretary of Energy under President Joe Biden
- Reed E. Hundt, Federal Communications Commission chairman under President Bill Clinton (born in Ann Arbor)
- Herbert W. Kalmbach, attorney to President Richard Nixon (born in Port Huron)
- Robert McClelland, governor of Michigan from 1852 to 1853 and US secretary of the interior under President James Buchanan (born in Greencastle, Pennsylvania; settled in Monroe)
- John N. Mitchell, US attorney general under President Richard Nixon 1969–72 (born in Detroit)
- Cecilia Muñoz, White House director of Intergovernmental Affairs under President Barack Obama (born in Detroit; raised in Livonia)
- Frank Murphy, Detroit mayor, Michigan governor, last governor-general of the Philippines and first high commissioner to the Philippines, US attorney general and Supreme Court justice (born in Harbor Beach)
- Tom Price (born 1954), US secretary of Health and Human Services under President Donald Trump (born in Lansing, raised in Dearborn)
- Ann Romney, former First Lady of Massachusetts (born in Detroit)
- George W. Romney, governor of Michigan 1963–69, chairman of American Motors, US secretary of Housing and Urban Development (born in Chihuahua, Mexico; raised in Salt Lake City, moved to Detroit)
- Mitt Romney, US senator for Utah, governor of Massachusetts (2003–2007), and 2012 Republican nominee for president (born in Detroit; raised in Bloomfield Hills)
- Rodney E. Slater, US secretary of transportation under President Bill Clinton (born in Marianna, Arkansas; lived some time in Ypsilanti)
- Margaret Spellings, US secretary of education under President George W. Bush, co-author of No Child Left Behind Act (born in Ann Arbor)
- Gene Sperling, director of National Economic Council under presidents Bill Clinton and Barack Obama (born in Ann Arbor)
- Potter Stewart, US Supreme Court justice (born in Jackson)
- Arthur Summerfield, US postmaster general 1953–61 (born in Pinconning)
- Edwin F. Uhl, mayor of Grand Rapids, ambassador to Germany, assistant secretary of state, and for 13 days in 1895 was acting US secretary of state (born in Rush, New York, raised in Ypsilanti, moved to Grand Rapids)

=== Michigan political figures ===
- Russell A. Alger, governor of Michigan 1902–07, US senator, secretary of War during Spanish–American War (born in Ohio; moved to Grand Rapids)
- Dennis Archer, mayor of Detroit 1994–2001 (born in Detroit)
- Dave Bing, mayor of Detroit 2009–2013 (born in Washington, D.C.; moved to Michigan)
- Austin Blair, anti-slavery governor of Michigan (born in New York; settled in Eaton Rapids)
- James Blanchard, governor of Michigan 1983–91, ambassador to Canada (born in Detroit)
- Prentiss M. Brown, US senator, chairman of Detroit Edison Company and Mackinac Bridge Authority (born in St. Ignace)
- Jerome Cavanagh, mayor of Detroit 1962–70 (born in Detroit)
- John Conyers, second longest-serving member of US House of Representatives (born in Detroit)
- Debbie Dingell, US representative (born in Detroit)
- John Dingell, longest-serving member of US House of Representatives (born in Colorado Springs, Colorado; raised in Detroit)
- John Engler, three-term governor of Michigan (born in Mount Pleasant)
- Paul G. Goebel, two-term mayor of Grand Rapids (born in Grand Rapids)
- Roman Gribbs, mayor of Detroit 1970–74 (born in Detroit)
- Alexander Groesbeck, 30th governor of Michigan (born in Warren)
- Ebenezer O. Grosvenor, 14th lieutenant governor and state treasurer (born in New York, lived and died in Jonesville)
- Philip A. Hart, US senator (born in Bryn Mawr, Pennsylvania; moved to Detroit)
- Andy Levin, US congressman (born in Berkley)
- Carl Levin, US senator 1979–2015 (born in Detroit)
- T. John Lesinski, Michigan lieutenant governor and judge (born in Detroit)
- Sander M. Levin, US congressman (born in Detroit)
- Oscar Marx, mayor of Detroit 1913–18 (born in Wayne County)
- Louis Miriani, mayor of Detroit 1957–62 (born in Detroit)
- Russell C. Ostrander, mayor of Lansing and chief justice of state Supreme Court (born in Ypsilanti)
- Hazen S. Pingree, mayor of Detroit 1890–97 (born in Denmark, Maine; moved to Detroit)
- Charles E. Potter, US senator 1952–59 (born in Lapeer)
- Donald W. Riegle Jr., US senator 1976–95 (born in Flint)
- Dorothy Comstock Riley, Michigan Supreme Court judge, first Hispanic woman elected to Supreme Court of any state (born in Detroit)
- Lenore Romney, former First Lady of Michigan, 1970 US senate candidate (born in Utah, lived in Bloomfield Hills, died in Royal Oak)
- Solomon Sibley, first mayor of Detroit (born in Sutton, Massachusetts, moved to Michigan)
- Debbie Stabenow, US senator (born in Gladwin)
- Rashida Tlaib, US representative (born in Detroit)
- Arthur H. Vandenberg, US senator, founder of the United Nations (born in Grand Rapids)
- George W. Welsh, mayor of Grand Rapids 1938–49 and lieutenant governor (born in Scotland)
- Gretchen Whitmer, 49th governor of Michigan (born in Lansing)
- G. Mennen Williams, 41st governor of Michigan (born in Detroit)
- Howard Wolpe, US congressman, special envoy to Great Lakes Region of Africa, director of Africa Program at Woodrow Wilson International Center for Scholars (born in California, settled in Kalamazoo)
- Coleman Young, mayor of Detroit 1974–94 (born in Tuscaloosa, Alabama, moved to Detroit)

=== Other political figures ===
- Allen Alley, chairman of Oregon Republican Party (born in Kalamazoo)
- Arthur Brown, US senator from Utah (born in Kalamazoo)
- Jane L. Campbell, mayor of Cleveland, Ohio, 2002–06 (born in Ann Arbor)
- Amanda Carpenter, political adviser and speechwriter for Sen. Jim DeMint (born in Montrose)
- Laurie Perry Cookingham, city manager of Kansas City, Missouri, for 19 years, tenure longer than any US city manager (born in Saginaw)
- Dr. Royal S. Copeland, US senator from New York (born in Dexter)
- Rennie Davis, prominent anti-Vietnam War protest leader of 1960s (born in Lansing)
- Thomas Dewey, governor of New York, lost presidential race in 1944 and 1948 (born in Owosso)
- Frank Emerson, 15th governor of Wyoming (born in Saginaw)
- Michael Fougere, mayor of Regina, Saskatchewan, Canada (born in Farmington)
- Elisha Peyre Ferry, first governor of Washington Territory and Civil War colonel (born in Monroe)
- Obadiah Gardner, US senator for Maine (born near Port Huron)
- Tom Hayden, social and political activist, politician (born in Detroit)
- Clyde L. Herring, 26th governor of Iowa and US senator (born in Jackson County)
- William J. McConnell, third governor of Idaho (born in Commerce)
- William E. Quinby, US ambassador to the Netherlands (born in Maine, moved to Detroit)
- Henry Hastings Sibley, first governor of Minnesota (born in Detroit)
- John Sinclair, political activist, writer, musician (born in Flint)
- Jan Ting, unsuccessful 2006 US senate candidate for Delaware (born in Dearborn)
- Quantá Crews, State Representative 2023 - present for Arizona Legislative District 26, Democratic Caucus Whip 2025-2026, 2027 Arizona House of Representatives Speaker Pro Tempore (born in Wayne, raised in Inkster)

== Religious leaders ==
- Frederic Baraga, Roman Catholic missionary, bishop and Ojibway and Ottawa grammarian (born in present-day Slovenia; settled among the Native American mission at Arbre Croche (now Cross Village)
- Emma Pow Bauder, Conference Missionary, California Conference, Church of the United Brethren in Christ (born in North Adams)
- D. M. Canright, early leader of the Seventh-day Adventist Church (born in Kinderhook)
- D. Stanley Coors, American bishop of the Methodist Church (born in Pentwater)
- Daniel Dolan, Traditional Catholic bishop (born in Detroit)
- Walter Elliott, 19th-century Roman Catholic priest whose writing sparked the Americanism heresy (born in Detroit)
- William Montague Ferry, Presbyterian minister and missionary who founded several settlements in Ottawa County, known as the father of Grand Haven and of Ottawa County
- Lucien Greaves, social activist; spokesman and co-founder of The Satanic Temple
- Virginia Harris, publisher of the writings of Mary Baker Eddy; president and founding trustee of the Mary Baker Eddy Library for the Betterment of Humanity; chair of the Christian Science Board of Directors, 1990–2004 (lived in Birmingham)
- James Aloysius Hickey, cardinal and Roman Catholic archbishop of the Archdiocese of Washington (born in Midland)
- John C. Maxwell, evangelical Christian author, speaker, and pastor (born in Garden City)
- Bruce R. McConkie, prominent apostle and theologian of the Church of Jesus Christ of Latter-day Saints (born in Ann Arbor)
- Josh McDowell, leading Evangelical Christian apologist and author (born in Battle Creek and grew up in Union City)
- Warith Deen Mohammed (1933–2008), son of Elijah Muhammad, leader of American Society of Muslims (born in Hamtramck)
- Wallace Fard Muhammad, founder of Nation of Islam (birthplace debated; moved to Detroit and founded his first mosque there)
- Thomas Gumbleton, Roman Catholic auxiliary bishop (born in Detroit)
- Henry Churchill King, theologian, president of Oberlin College and member of the King-Crane Commission on the status of Palestine (born in Hillsdale)
- Baba Rexheb, Moslem leader and mystic, founder of the Bektashi Sufi lodge in Taylor (born in what is now Albania; fled to Taylor)
- Frances W. Sibley (1867-1958), missionary and National President of the Girls' Friendly Society of the Episcopal Church
- Edmund Szoka, president of the Pontifical Commission for Vatican City State (born in Grand Rapids)
- John A. Trese, priest of the Roman Catholic Archdiocese of Detroit (born in St. Clair)
- Allen Henry Vigneron, Roman Catholic Bishop of Oakland in California (born in Mount Clemens)
- Geerhardus Vos, theologian known as the "father of reformed biblical theology" (born in the Netherlands; moved to Grand Rapids)
- Ellen G. White, founding member of the Seventh-day Adventist Church (born in Maine, settled in Battle Creek with husband James)
- James Springer White, founding member of the Seventh-day Adventist Church (born in Palmyra, Maine, settled in Battle Creek)
- Sherwin Wine, rabbi, founder of the Society for Humanistic Judaism (born in Detroit)

== Scholars ==
=== Art historians ===
- Alfred Barr, art historian, founding director of the Museum of Modern Art (born in Detroit)
- Louis A. Waldman, art historian (born in Wyandotte)

=== Economists, mathematicians, and social scientists ===
- Henry Carter Adams, economist (born in Davenport, Iowa; moved to Ann Arbor)
- Akhil Reed Amar, legal scholar, an expert on constitutional law and criminal procedure (born in Ann Arbor)
- Earl Babbie, sociologist (born in Detroit)
- Bruce Bartlett, economist, advisor to presidents Ronald Reagan and George H. W. Bush (born in Ann Arbor)
- Edward Griffith Begle, mathematician specializing in topology, director of the School Mathematics Study Group (born in Saginaw)
- George David Birkhoff, mathematician best known for the ergodic theorem (born in Overisel)
- Robert John Braidwood, archaeologist and anthropologist (born in Detroit)
- Napoleon Chagnon, anthropologist (born in Port Austin)
- Charles Cooley, sociologist, known for his concept of the looking-glass self (born in Ann Arbor)
- Samuel J. Eldersveld, political scientist, mayor of Ann Arbor, department chair at University of Michigan
- Carol Karp, mathematician and leader in the theory of infinitary logic (born in Forest Grove))
- Alfred V. Kidder, archaeologist (born in Marquette)
- Leslie Kish, sociologist and statistician, pioneer in survey sampling methodology, professor at University of Michigan
- Eduard Lindeman, educational pioneer (born in St. Clair)
- Tom Morey, mathematician, aerospace engineer, musician and surfing analyst (born in Detroit)
- Walter Pitts, logician who worked in the field of cognitive psychology (born in Detroit)
- Wardell Pomeroy, psychologist known for his work on sexual behavior (born in Kalamazoo)
- Michael Porter, economist and author (born in Ann Arbor)
- Paul Rehak, archaeologist (born in Ann Arbor)
- Jeff Sachs, economist, economic adviser to nations, author, director of the Earth Institute at Columbia University (born in Detroit)
- Claude E. Shannon, "father of information theory and of digital computer circuit design" (born in Petoskey; raised in Gaylord)
- Robert Shiller, Nobel Prize-winning economist, academic, author (born in Detroit)
- Nate Silver, statistician, psephologist, and writer (born in East Lansing)
- Isadore Singer, mathematician (born in Detroit)
- Theda Skocpol, sociologist and political scientist (born in Detroit)
- Stephen Smale, Fields Medal-winning mathematician (born in Flint)
- Gene Sperling, economist, political expert, counselor to Treasury Secretary Tim Geithner (born in Ann Arbor)
- Kenneth Waltz, prominent international relations theorist (born in Ann Arbor)
- Brian Wesbury, economist (born in Ann Arbor)
- Leslie White, anthropologist and major advocate of neoevolutionism (born in Kansas, moved to Ann Arbor)

=== Historians ===
- Ray Stannard Baker, historian and biographer of President Woodrow Wilson (born in Lansing)
- Charles Bigelow, print historian, font designer, MacArthur Foundation Award winner (born in Detroit)
- Bruce Catton, historian of the US Civil War (born in Petoskey; raised in Benzonia)
- John D'Arms, history of ancient Rome (born in Poughkeepsie, New York, moved to Ann Arbor)
- Natalie Zemon Davis, historian and feminist, pioneered the "new social history," author of The Return of Martin Guerre (born in Detroit)
- Samuel J. Eldersveld, political scientist at the University of Michigan; former mayor of Ann Arbor (from Ann Arbor)

=== Natural scientists and engineers ===
- Charles Bachman, computer scientist (lived in East Lansing)
- Werner Emmanuel Bachmann, biochemistry pioneer in steroid synthesis who carried out the first total synthesis of a steroidal hormone, equilenin (born in Detroit)
- Liberty Hyde Bailey, botanist (born in South Haven)
- Bob Bemer, computer scientist (born in Sault Ste. Marie)
- J Harlen Bretz, geologist (born in Saranac)
- Lyman James Briggs, engineer, physicist, headed the Briggs Advisory Committee on Uranium (born in Assyria)
- Robert L. Carroll, paleontologist (born in Kalamazoo)
- Douglas Houghton Campbell, botanist (born in Detroit)
- Arthur Craig, AD (Bud) Craig, neuroanatomist and neuroscientist (born in Lansing)
- Kazimierz Fajans, chemist (born in Warsaw, Poland, fled Nazi persecution to settle in Ann Arbor)
- David Fairchild, botanist (born in Lansing)
- Robert M. Graham, computer scientist, contributed to Multics (born in Michigan)
- Michael Hendricks, psychologist, suicidologist, and an advocate for the LGBT community
- Alfred Hershey, Nobel Prize-winning bacteriologist (born in Owosso)
- Robert E. Horton, "father of hydrology, ecologist and soil scientist (born in Parma)
- Nicholas Hotton III, paleontologist (born in Michigan)
- Douglass Houghton, first state geologist of Michigan, explorer of Keweenaw County (born in New York; moved to Detroit)
- John H. Hubbell, radiation physicist (born in Ann Arbor)
- Edward Israel, astronomer and polar explorer (born in Kalamazoo)
- Ernest Kirkendall, chemist and metallurgist (born in East Jordan, raised in Highland Park)
- William LeMessurier, structural engineer (born in Pontiac)
- Forest Ray Moulton, astronomer (born in Le Roy)
- Jonas Salk, Head of Epidemiology at the University of Michigan
- Glenn T. Seaborg, chemist, Nobel Prize winner (born in Ishpeming)
- Werner Spitz, forensic pathologist, emigrated from Israel to St. Clair Shores
- Samuel C. C. Ting, Nobel Prize-winning physicist (born in Ann Arbor)
- James Craig Watson, astronomer (born in Fingal, Ontario; raised in Ann Arbor)
- Thomas Huckle Weller, virologist and Nobel Prize winner in medicine (born in Ann Arbor)

=== Philosophers ===
- Brand Blanshard, Yale University rationalist philosopher (born in Fredericksburg, Ohio; raised in Bay View)
- Voltairine de Cleyre, anarchist philosopher and political activist (born in Leslie)
- William A. Earle, Northwestern University philosopher of existentialism and phenomenology (born in Saginaw)
- Gary Habermas, historian, New Testament scholar, and philosopher of religion (born in Detroit)
- Reinhold Niebuhr, political philosopher and theologian (moved to Detroit)
- Alvin Plantinga, philosopher of religion (born in Ann Arbor)
- Wilfrid Sellars, philosopher (born in Ann Arbor)

=== Other scholars and researchers ===
- Benjamin Franklin Bailey, electrical engineer, professor and researcher (born in Sheridan)
- Ellen Dannin, Penn State law professor, expert in labor law of New Zealand and US (born in Flint)
- Richard Ellmann, literary critic and biographer (born in Highland Park)
- H. Wiley Hitchcock, musicologist director for Institute for Studies in American Music, co-author of New Grove Dictionary of American Music (born in Detroit)
- Emmett Leith, electrical engineering professor and inventor of three-dimensional holography (born in Detroit; moved to Ann Arbor)
- Larry Soderquist, corporate and securities law expert, novelist, Vanderbilt professor (born in Ypsilanti)

== Others ==
- Huwaida Arraf, co-founder of International Solidarity Movement (ISM), a pro-Palestinian organization (born in Detroit)
- Todd Beamer, passenger aboard United Airlines Flight 93 recognized as a hero for his actions (born in Flint)
- Harry Blackstone Sr., magician (born in Illinois, settled in Colon, where his home is now American Museum of Magic)
- Harry Blackstone Jr., magician and television performer (born in Three Rivers)
- Ralph Bunche, 1950 Nobel Peace Prize winner, first won by an African American (born in Detroit)
- Christie Brinkley, supermodel and actress (born in Monroe)
- William Durant Campbell, major leader in World Scout Foundation (born in Flint)
- Martin H. Carmody, Depression-era Supreme Knight of Knights of Columbus (born in Grand Rapids)
- Emor L. Calkins, State president of the Michigan Woman's Christian Temperance Union for 25 years
- Patricia Donnelly, Miss America 1939 (born in Detroit)
- Pamela Eldred, Miss America 1970 (born in West Bloomfield)
- Nancy Fleming, Miss America 1961 (born in Montague)
- Frederick Carl Frieseke, Impressionist painter (born in Owosso)
- Ruth A. Gerry – one of the first female physicians in Michigan.
- Joe Girard, salesman and author (born in Detroit)
- Carole Gist, Miss USA 1990 (born in Detroit)
- Kirsten Haglund, Miss America 2008 (born in Farmington Hills)
- Mona Hanna-Attisha, pediatrician and public health advocate (grew up in Royal Oak)
- Robert G. Heft, designer of current 50-star American flag (born in Saginaw)
- Lewis Cass Ledyard, lawyer, president of New York City Bar Association (born in Detroit)
- Tom McEvoy, professional poker player, 1983 World Series of Poker champion (born in Grand Rapids)
- Vince Megna, lawyer, author and primary shaper of so-called "lemon laws" (born in Iron Mountain)
- Perle Mesta, prominent Washington, D.C., socialite (born in Sturgis)
- Marvin Mitchelson, celebrity divorce attorney (born in Detroit)
- Jerry Mitchell, Tony Award-winning choreographer (born in Paw Paw)
- Kenya Moore, Miss USA 1993 (born in Detroit)
- Lenda Murray, bodybuilder, 8-time Ms. Olympia (born in Detroit)
- Kaye Lani Rae Rafko, Miss America 1988 (born in Monroe)
- Terry Rakolta, founder of Americans for Responsible Television (from Bloomfield Hills)
- Greg Raymer, 2004 World Series of Poker champion (born in Minot, North Dakota; raised in Lansing)
- Helen Cary Russell, president, Michigan State Federation of Women's Clubs
- Norman Shumway, heart transplant pioneer (born in Kalamazoo)
- Annie Edson Taylor, first person to go over Niagara Falls in a barrel (lived in Bay City)
- R.J. Thomas, labor leader (born in East Palestine, Ohio; moved to Detroit in his early 20s)
- Dita Von Teese, burlesque dancer (born in West Branch)
- Veronica Webb, model, Revlon spokesperson (born in Detroit)
- Ken Westerfield, disc sport (Frisbee) pioneer, athlete, showman, promoter (born in Detroit)
- Floyd Wilcox, president of Shimer College (born in Mason)

== See also ==
- List of Michigan suffragists
- List of people from Adrian, Michigan
- List of people from Ann Arbor, Michigan
- List of people from Bloomfield Hills, Michigan
- List of people from Detroit
- List of people from Flint, Michigan
- List of people from Grand Rapids, Michigan
- List of people from Saginaw, Michigan

== References and further reading ==
- Gavrilovich, Peter & Bill McGraw (2000). The Detroit Almanac. Detroit Free Press. ISBN 0-937247-34-0.
- Hill, Eric J. & John Gallagher (2002). AIA Detroit: The American Institute of Architects Guide to Detroit Architecture. Wayne State University Press. ISBN 0-8143-3120-3.
- Meyer, Katherine Mattingly; McElroy, Martin C.P. (1980). Detroit Architecture A.I.A. Guide Revised Edition. Introduction by W. Hawkins Ferry. Wayne State University Press. ISBN 0-8143-1651-4.
