= List of people from Flint, Michigan =

The following is a list of notable people who were born, or lived for a significant period of time, in Flint, Michigan, United States.

== Movie, radio, television and theater figures ==
- Bob Bell, original WGN Bozo the Clown
- Sandra Bernhard, actress, author and comedian
- Howard Bragman, public relations practitioner, television pundit, writer and lecturer
- William David Brohn, Tony Award-winning music orchestrator
- Tony Burton, actor, football player, and boxer, Rocky films
- Kerry Conran, filmmaker, writer, director
- Terry Crews, actor, host and football player
- Erin Darke, TV and film actress
- Seamus Dever, actor, Castle
- Bob Eubanks, game show host, The Newlywed Game
- Casey Kasem, radio DJ who started his career in Flint; host of the long-running American Top 40; voice actor, most notably as Shaggy Rogers in the Scooby-Doo franchise and Robin in the Super Friends franchise
- Christian Keyes, author, actor, singer, producer, philanthropist
- Nancy Kovack, actress and wife of the conductor Zubin Mehta
- David Magee, Oscar-nominated screenwriter for Life of Pi and Finding Neverland
- Jerry Minor, comedian and actor
- Michael Moore, from the nearby town of Davison, liberal activist and filmmaker; writer and director of Roger & Me, Bowling For Columbine, Fahrenheit 9/11, Sicko, Capitalism: A Love Story, Fahrenheit 11/9
- Marilyn Nash, actress, co-starred with Charlie Chaplin in film Monsieur Verdoux
- Charles Smith, born in Flint, 1920
- Wendey Stanzler, editor and director, Roger & Me, Sex and the City, Desperate Housewives
- Maddie Taylor, voice actress, storyboard artist and comedian
- Charles Wolcott, film music composer

== Musicians and bands ==
- Bfb Da Packman, rapper
- Don Brewer, drummer
- Dee Dee Bridgewater, jazz singer
- Betty Carter, jazz vocalist
- Chiodos, screamo/post-hardcore band on Equal Vision Records (Davison, MI)
- Jon Connor, rapper
- The Dayton Family, rap group
- DFC, hip hop duo
- Mark Farner, solo rock artist, formerly of Grand Funk Railroad
- Fredwreck, record producer of Snoop Dogg, Dr. Dre, Britney Spears
- Grand Funk Railroad, rock group
- Greet Death, shoegaze band
- Mona Haydar, Syrian-American rapper, poet and songwriter
- LaKisha Jones, American Idol 2007 finalist, third runner-up
- Mario Judah, rapper
- King 810, metal band
- Miko Marks, country singer
- MC Breed, rapper
- Me Phi Me, rapper
- Geoff Moore, onetime member of Geoff Moore and the Distance, Christian rock band
- PBK, noise/experimental composer
- Don Preston, onetime member of Frank Zappa and the Mothers of Invention
- Question Mark and the Mysterians, rock group
- Ready for the World, R&B group
- Repulsion, death metal/grindcore band
- Rio da Yung Og, rapper
- Antwaun Stanley, R&B singer and songwriter
- The Swellers, punk rock band; members grew up in Fenton, Michigan, but got their start playing Flint Local 432
- Terry Knight and the Pack, rock group, predecessor to Grand Funk Railroad
- Top Authority, rap group
- Whitey Morgan and the 78's, honky tonk and outlaw country band
- Fleming Williams of The Hues Corporation; lead singer on disco hit "Rock the Boat"
- YN Jay, rapper

== Sports figures ==
=== Baseball ===
- Jim Abbott, one-handed MLB pitcher famous for throwing a no-hitter despite his disability
- Scott Aldred, MLB pitcher
- Steve Boros, MLB infielder, manager and executive
- Geraldine Guest, All-American Girls Professional Baseball League player
- Jeff Hamilton, MLB infielder
- Rick Leach, MLB outfielder
- Joe Mays, MLB pitcher
- Ron Pruitt, MLB outfielder and catcher
- Merv Rettenmund, MLB outfielder
- Mickey Weston, MLB pitcher

=== Basketball ===
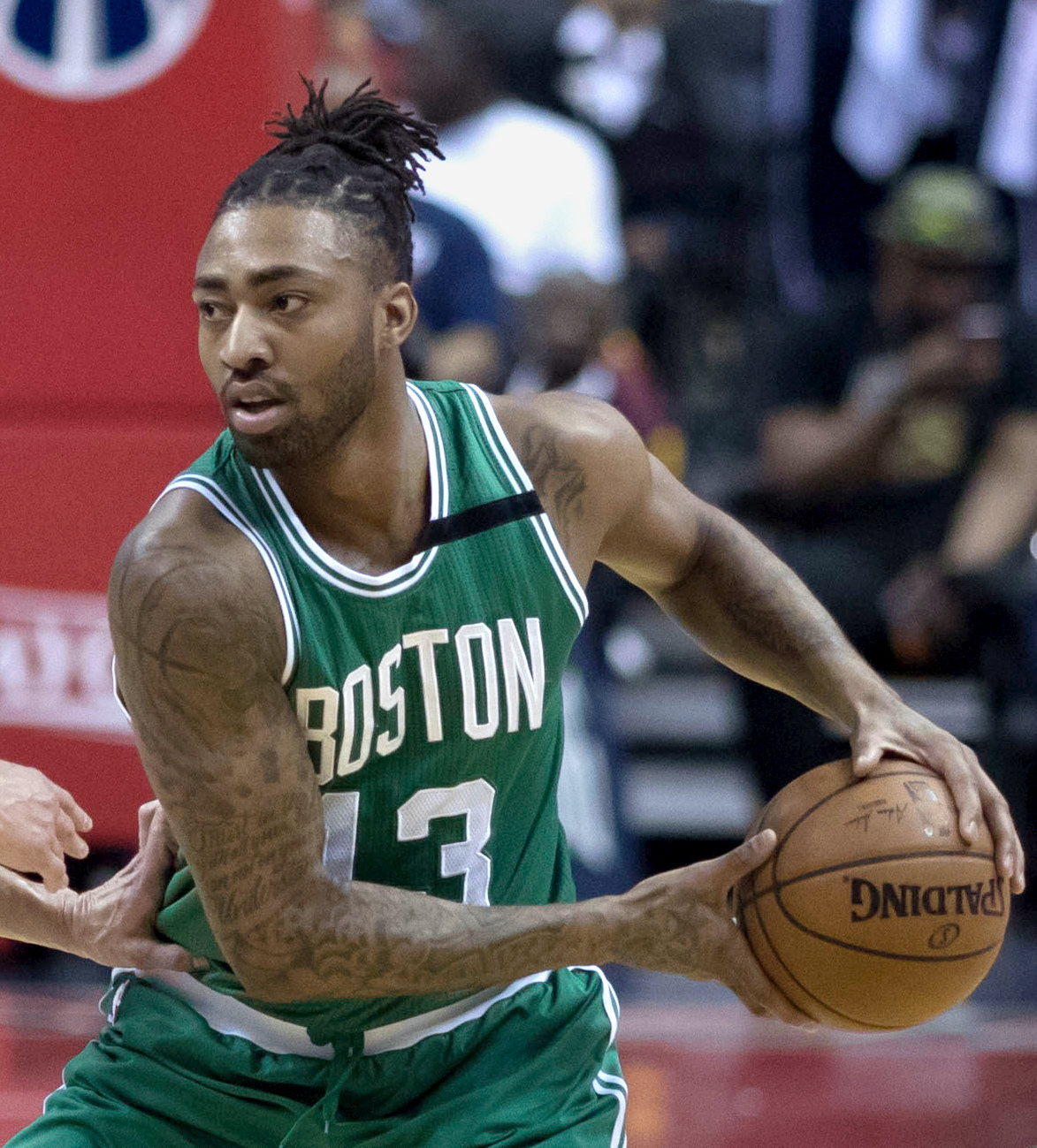
James Young

- Charlie Bell, one of Michigan State University's "Flintstones"
- Miles Bridges (born 1998), professional basketball player for the NBA's Phoenix Suns
- Demetrius Calip, player for 1989 University of Michigan championship team
- Mateen Cleaves, Michigan State player, one of the "Flintstones"
- JuJuan Cooley, pro player in Romania
- Tonya Edwards, European and WNBA player
- Marty Embry, played for DePaul University, drafted by Utah Jazz, 13-year pro career, chef, author
- Desmon Farmer, basketball player with Ironi Ashkelon of the Israeli Basketball Premier League
- Terry Furlow, MSU and NBA player
- Jeff Grayer, Olympic and NBA player
- Javontae Hawkins (born 1993), player in the Israeli Basketball Premier League
- Cory Hightower, Flint high school and professional basketball player
- Darryl Johnson (born 1965), MSU player
- Kyle Kuzma (born 1995), professional basketball player for the Milwaukee Bucks
- Tamika Louis, Fresno State player and now a coach
- Roy Marble, former Iowa and NBA player
- Thad McFadden (born 1957), American-born Georgian national basketball player
- JaVale McGee, former Nevada and current Vaqueros de Bayamón player
- Pamela McGee, USC and Olympic women's basketball star
- Monté Morris, professional basketball player for the Minnesota Timberwolves
- Deanna Nolan, WNBA player
- Morris Peterson, Michigan State player, one of the "Flintstones"
- Glen Rice, Michigan and NBA player
- Eddie Robinson, NBA player
- Keith Smith, Loyola Marymount player
- Barry Stevens, Iowa State player
- Stacey Thomas, WNBA player
- Trent Tucker, Minnesota and NBA player
- Coquese Washington, WNBA player; first president of WNBA players association; current assistant coach of SMU Mustangs women's basketball team
- James Young, NBA player, 2019-20 top scorer in the Israel Basketball Premier League

=== Track and field ===
- Herb Washington, four-time All-American sprinter, world record holder, professional baseball player

=== Boxing ===
- Tony Burton, also football player and actor
- Chris Byrd, world champion
- Tracy Byrd, world champion
- Andre Dirrell, pro middleweight boxer, Olympic bronze medalist in 2004 Summer Olympics in Athens
- Anthony Dirrell, pro middleweight boxer
- Claressa Shields, first back-to-back two-time Olympic gold medalist in 2012 Summer Olympics in London and 2016 Summer Olympics in Rio de Janeiro

=== Football ===
- Carl Banks, linebacker, two-time Super Bowl champion
- Tony Branoff, running back and MVP University fo Michigan
- Tony Burton, also boxer and actor
- Brandon Carr, cornerback for Baltimore Ravens, Dallas Cowboys
- Todd Carter, kickoff specialist for Carolina Panthers
- Lynn Chandnois, Pro Bowl player for Pittsburgh Steelers
- Don Coleman, Michigan State player, member of College Football Hall of Fame
- Terry Crews, NFL defensive end; actor
- Courtney Hawkins, NFL wide receiver
- Mark Ingram II, NFL running back; 2009 Heisman Trophy winner; born and raised in Grand Blanc, attended Flint Southwestern Academy
- Mark Ingram Sr., NFL wide receiver
- Stephen Jones, CFL player
- David Kircus, pro football wide receiver
- Paul Krause, NFL Hall of Famer
- Todd Lyght, NFL defensive back, Notre Dame assistant coach
- Thad McFadden, NFL wide receiver
- Mike Miller, NFL wide receiver
- Booker Moore, running back for Penn State
- Jim Morrissey, NFL linebacker for Super Bowl XX champion Chicago Bears
- Don Morton, head coach, North Dakota State, Wisconsin
- Ricky Patton, NFL running back for Super Bowl XVI champion San Francisco 49ers
- Clarence Peaks, NFL fullback
- Thomas Rawls, NFL running back for Seattle Seahawks
- Harold "Tubby" Raymond, member of College Football Hall of Fame; 300 wins as head coach at University of Delaware
- Andre Rison, NFL wide receiver, 5-time Pro Bowl selection, Super Bowl champion
- Bob Rowe, NFL lineman
- Jon Runyan, 14-year NFL lineman; politician
- Dan Skuta, NFL player
- Fernando Smith, NFL defensive lineman
- Robaire Smith, NFL defensive lineman
- Barry Stokes, NFL offensive lineman
- Andre Weathers, cornerback, University of Michigan and New York Giants
- Brent Williams, NFL defensive end
- Reggie Williams, NFL linebacker
- Chris Wilson, Canadian Football League player
- Lonnie Young, NFL defensive back

=== Hockey ===
- Ken Morrow, defenseman, Davison, Michigan native, part of Miracle on Ice and four-time Stanley Cup champion with New York Islanders
- Brian Rolston, won 1995 Stanley Cup championship with New Jersey Devils
- Tim Thomas, goaltender; Davison native; former goalie for Dallas Stars, Florida Panthers and Boston Bruins; 2010 Olympics silver medalist, two-time Vezina Trophy winner, 2011 Stanley Cup champion and Conn Smythe award winner

=== Mixed martial arts ===
- Mike Perry, UFC fighter since 2016

=== Tennis ===
- MaliVai Washington, 1996 Wimbeldon finalist

=== Weightlifting ===
- Lamar Gant, powerlifter, first person in history to deadlift five times his own bodyweight

== Writers, journalists, and poets ==
- David W. Blight, author and Sterling Professor at Yale University, 2019 Pulitzer Prize winner for Frederick Douglass: Prophet of Freedom
- Christopher Paul Curtis, author of books for children and young adults
- William M. Gallagher, photographer, 1953 Pulitzer Prize winner for Flint Journal
- Ben Hamper, writer, Rivethead: Tales from the Assembly Line
- E. Lynn Harris, author
- Patrick Jones, author of books for young adults, library textbooks, and resource guides
- Adam Kotsko, author and professor at Shimer College
- Edmund G. Love, author (Subways Are for Sleeping)
- Steve Mariotti, author of several books; founder of the National Foundation for Teaching Entrepreneurship
- Marcus Sakey, author and host of the Travel Channel show Hidden City
- Jon Scieszka, children's author
- John Sinclair, poet and activist
- Theodore Weesner, novelist, best known for his coming-of-age novel The Car Thief

== Others ==
- Todd Beamer, passenger on United 93 flight who attempted to foil hijacking and reclaim aircraft on 9/11
- Benjamin Bolger, student, second-most-credentialed person in modern history
- David Sheldon Boone, former U.S. Army signals analyst who was convicted of espionage-related charges in 1999
- Paul L. Brady, first African-American federal administrative law judge
- William E. Bryan Jr., United States Air Force major general and World War II flying ace
- Henry Howland Crapo, 14th governor of Michigan, founder of Flint and Holly Railroad
- Dan David, investor, activist short-seller, and whistle-blower
- Genora Johnson Dollinger, union organizer
- William Crapo Durant, founder of General Motors
- Arthur Jerome Eddy, art collector and critic
- Jerome Eddy, mayor of Flint, 1878–79; diplomat
- Barry Edmonds, photographer
- Thomas M. George, M.D., former Michigan state representative and state senator
- Mary Henrietta Graham, the first African-American woman to be admitted to the University of Michigan (graduated from Flint High School in 1876)
- Duane D. Hackney, most decorated airman in history of the Air Force
- Amir Mirza Hekmati, U.S. Marine who spent time in prison in Iran as falsely accused CIA spy, went to high school in Flint and Flint Township
- Dale Kildee, former member of the Michigan House of Representatives and U.S. House of Representatives
- Dan Kildee, member of the U.S. House of Representatives
- Sidney Redding Mason, Minnesota state legislator and businessman
- Eric Mays, former auto worker and politician; city council member representing North East Flint
- Floyd J. McCree, first African-American mayor of Flint, namesake of Floyd J. McCree building in downtown Flint
- Samuel B. McKinney, civil rights leader, Baptist pastor
- Donald R. McMonagle, decorated pilot, astronaut, NASA launch manager
- Craig Menear, chairman and CEO of The Home Depot
- Charles Stewart Mott, two-time mayor of Flint, businessman, philanthropist; namesake of Mott Community College, the Charles Stewart Mott Foundation, the Charles S. Mott Prize, the C.S. Mott Children's Hospital, and Mott Lake
- Stewart Rawlings Mott, philanthropist
- Eric Ogden, photographer
- Betty Lou Reed, Illinois state representative
- Kelly Reemtsen, contemporary artist
- Donald Riegle, former U.S. senator and congressman
- Stephen Smale, mathematician
- Tim Sneller, member of the Michigan House of Representatives
- Jay Springsteen, motorcycle national champion
- Andrew J. Transue, Genesee County prosecutor, U.S. congressman and attorney (Morissette v. United States)
- Karen Weaver, psychologist, businesswoman, and first female mayor of Flint
- Michael M. Wood, former U.S. ambassador to Sweden, grew up in Flint

== See also ==
- List of mayors of Flint, Michigan
