= Virginia Harris =

Christian Science teacher and practitioner

Virginia S. Harris is a teacher and practitioner of The First Church of Christ, Scientist. She previously served as Publisher of The Writings of Mary Baker Eddy, President and founding Trustee of The Mary Baker Eddy Library, and member and Chairman of The Christian Science Board of Directors between 1990 and 2004.

== Biography ==
In her early career, Harris worked as a schoolteacher, television host, businesswoman, and child abuse prevention activist. Harris was involved in a near-fatal car crash, and attributed her recovery to Christian Science. In 1979, she became a practitioner listed in The Christian Science Journal, and in 1982 became a teacher of Christian Science.

Harris became Clerk of The Mother Church in March 1986. She traveled to East Germany in mid-April 1989 with Jill Gooding, a member of the Board of Directors, to support the Christian Science community in the country. Christian Science had been illegal in Communist controlled East Germany since March 1951, but Gooding and Harris helped support a reversal of the ban in November 1989, a week before the fall of the Berlin Wall. When Gooding retired from the Board in 1990, Harris replaced her there, then becoming board chair the next year, and serving on the Board in that position until 2004.

While on the Board, Harris took steps to modernize the church and address some of the issues that troubled it. In 2002, Harris was instrumental in the establishment of The Mary Baker Eddy Library and opening the archival collection of The Mother Church, including its large collection of 19th and early 20th century letters and artifacts, to scholars and the public for the first time.

Harris has spoken extensively on Christian Science and Mary Baker Eddy, and has encouraged cooperation with medical researchers. She was on the faculty of Harvard Medical School's semi-annual Spirituality & Healing in Medicine symposium from 1995 to 2002, speaking on Christian Science healing to hundreds of physicians, nurses, healthcare professionals, and clergy. She appeared in two exclusive interviews on Larry King Live, in 1999 and 2001, and has been interviewed by The Boston Globe, The New York Times, The Los Angeles Times, NPR and many other media sources.
