= The Bluescasters =

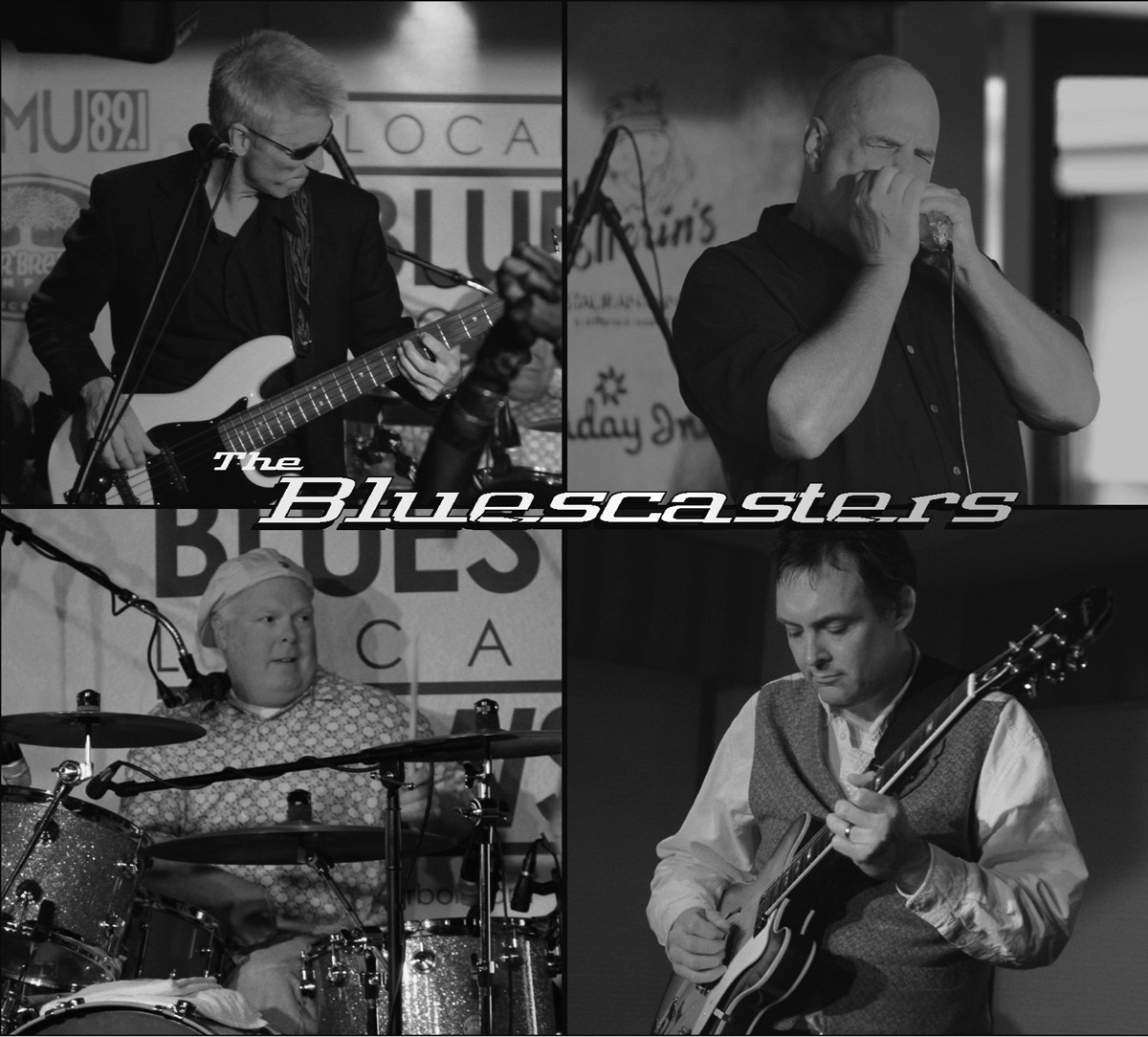

Background information
- Origin: Ann Arbor, Michigan, United States
- Genres: Blues
- Years active: 2004–present
- Members: Doug Wolgat; Harry Rodman; Phil Ryski; Kerry Adams
- Past members: Brian Delaney; George Katsakis; Diana LaFuente; Fred Eriksson
- Website: http://www.thebluescasters.com

The Bluescasters is an American, Michigan-based blues band formed in 2004 in Ann Arbor, Michigan, United States, who play in a style somewhat reminiscent of the Allman Brothers' Trouble No More. Current band members include Doug Wolgat (Bass/Vocals), Harry Rodman (Drums/Vocals), Phil Ryski (Guitar/Harmonica/Keyboards), and Kerry Adams (Guitar/Vocals).

== History ==
The Bluescasters band was founded in 2004 as a blues band in Ann Arbor, Michigan. Founding members Doug Wolgat and Harry Rodman met while playing with The Witch Doctors. After playing in local clubs for a year, the Bluescasters released their debut album, Five Dimes, followed by Give Yourself the Blues in 2006. Their third album LIVE was released in 2010. In 2009, they opened for Jim McCarty and Mystery Train, and in 2010 for Kim Wilson's Blues All Stars. They have performed at the Alpena Blues Festival, Plymouth's Music in the Air, Ypsilanti's Heritage Festival, Ann Arbor's Summer Festival, and at many Michigan clubs.

== Discography ==
- Five Dimes (2005)
- Give Yourself the Blues (2006)
- LIVE (2010)
- Something Going Down (2014)
- Bluescaster (2016)

== Awards ==
- 2006 - Finalists in the Detroit Blues Society Blues Challenge
- 2007 - Detroit Music Awards nomination: "Outstanding Blues Artist/Group"
- 2007 - Detroit Music Awards nomination: "Outstanding Blues/R & B Recording" for Give Yourself the Blues
- 2010 - Finalists in the Windsor Battle of the Blues (placed second)
