= Louis Pesha =

American photographer (1868–1912)

Louis James Pesha
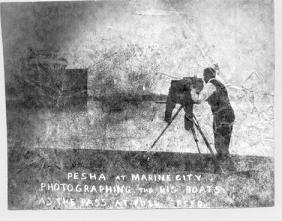
- Only known photo of Louis Pesha. He is shown photographing a passing ship on the St. Clair River.
- Born: August 11, 1868; Euphemia, Ontario, Canada
- Died: October 1, 1912 (aged 44) near Inwood, Ontario, Canada
- Known for: Photography

Louis James Pesha (August 11, 1868 – October 1, 1912) was a noted photographer of ships of the Great Lakes and early 20th century Michigan landmarks. Pesha died in an accident while operating his steam-powered automobile. He practiced his trade, owning the Pesha Postcard Company in Marine City, Michigan. Today, his photos are of highly sought after by collectors of Great Lakes memorabilia.

== Early life ==
Pesha was born on August 11, 1868, at Euphemia, Ontario, Canada. He worked in farming in the Euphemia area until about 1895, when he learned the photography trade. For the next six years, he had studios in Oil Springs, Inwood, Alvinston and Brigden, Ontario.

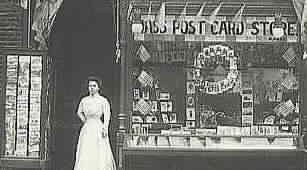
Lena E. Pesha standing in front of the Pesha Art Studio in Marine City, Michigan.

== His studio ==
In 1901, Pesha moved to the United States and settled in Marine City, Michigan. He opened a photography studio known as various variations of "The Pesha Postcard Company."

His primary focus was on photographing commercial ships as they passed in front of his studio, on the Saint Clair River. He also traveled around the Great Lakes Basin, photographing railroad stations and buildings in villages, towns, and cities in the United States and his native Canada. He would later print his photographs as postcards, selling them to stores and in classified ads in journals and magazines for the public to buy and use.

Pesha was also known for his trick photography. These postcards depicted impossible scenes and played on popular subjects of the time such as flight.

Following Pesha's death in 1912, his widow continued the business, in Marine City, until about 1920. She later moved the business to Detroit, but photo postcards passed out of fashion in the 1920s. The vast majority of his glass negatives were then destroyed.

== Personal life ==
On August 29, 1892, Pesha married Lena E. Fancher of Santena, Illinois. They had one child, born in 1901, Lorraine Pesha.

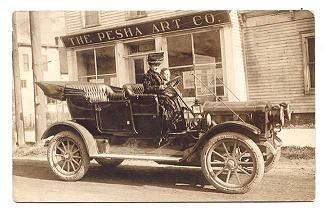
1910 White steam powered automobile operated by Louis Pesha at the time of his death.

In 1910, Pesha purchased a White Motor Company steam-powered automobile. This was then considered the top of luxury steam cars and was the only one registered in Marine City. He died after visiting his father's farm when his car overturned and his skull was fractured on October 1, 1912, in an automobile accident near Inwood, Ontario. He is buried in a family plot in Shetland, Ontario.
