= Kelly Reemtsen =

American contemporary artist

Kelly Reemtsen is a contemporary artist who lives and works in Los Angeles. She was born in Flint, Michigan, in 1967, and studied fashion design and painting at Central Michigan University and California State University Long Beach.

== Work ==
Kelly Reemtsen is best known for her bright and bold paintings of women carrying household tools such as chainsaws or axes. Her work often investigates the role of the modern woman, deconstructing societal perceptions of gender, power and femininity. Reemtsen's paintings are characterized by their thick impasto, stark white backgrounds and anonymous figures. Her most recent body of work explores the idea of breaking the metaphorical glass ceiling, often featuring female figures climbing on objects like chairs or ladders.

Reemtsen has depicted similar subject matter in series of prints, including woodcuts, etchings and screenprints. She has studied printmaking since the 1990s, most recently as an artist in residence at the Venice Printmaking studio in Venice, Italy. In the past, she also studied etchings with Peter Petengill at Wingate Studio in New Hampshire, and screen printing with Tony Clough at Serio Press in Los Angeles. In September 2016, Reemtsen was awarded a residency at the "Visiting Artist Printmaking Program" at the University of Central Florida's Flying Horse Editions studio. In 2019, her print was selected by the Royal Academy of London as lead image for the 2019 London Original Print Fair. She was also the featured Artist in Conversation at the LOPF 2019's Talks Programme.

She has also worked in sculpture, creating a series of resin pills, which she views as an accessory much like the jewelry or tools that populate her paintings, as well as a 2015 series of monumental cast stainless steel lipsticks, entitled Fuck the System.

Kelly Reemtsen's work has been exhibited widely in the United States, and is part of the Twentieth Century Fox and AT&T corporate collections.

== Education ==
In the late 1980s, Reemtsen began her studies at Central Michigan University, where she attended the Fine Art Program with a focus in Fashion Design. Ultimately, her ambitions took her to the West Coast, where she continued pursuing her degree at California State University Long Beach. While at Cal State Long Beach, Reemtsen extended her focus to include painting.

In the early 1990s, Reemtsen began a three-year private study with painter Michael Tracy. In 2001, Reemtsen's private study shifted to print-making, when she began working at Hee Sook Kim Studio in New York. Then, in 2005, she studied silkscreen studio and technique at Modern Multiples in Los Angeles.

In 2008, she was invited to attend Crown Point Press Etching Workshop in San Francisco, whereat she studied plate making and printing with master printers.

== Awards ==
2017 Print Project Advanced Graphics London England

2016 Visiting Artist Award Flying Horse Editions, Orlando FL

2016 Print Project Serio Press Los Angeles, CA

2015 Etching Project Wingate Studio, Hinsdale, NH

2015 Print Project Serio Press, Los Angeles, CA

2014 Outstanding Book of the Year Award, Gold Medal Independent Spirit Category “I’m Falling” by Kelly Reemtsen

== Publishing ==
Kelly Reemtsen published her first monograph, “I'm Falling,“ in 2013. The book won the Independent Spirit Award at the 2014 Outstanding Book of the Year Awards, hosted by Independent Publisher.

In 2015, she was one of fifteen artists selected for inclusion in the book "Cool Paintings" by Carolina Amell.

David Klein Gallery has published several Kelly Reemtsen exhibition catalogues since 2009, including Pattern, Over It, Equal Opportunity, and Striving for Perfection.

== Solo exhibitions ==
2019

“Pattern” David Klein Gallery Detroit, MI

The London Original Print Fair, Lead Image and featured speaker, Royal Academy London, UK

2018

“Fix It” Lyndsey Ingram, London UK

“Value” Albertz Benda. New York NY

“Object” Galleri Oxholm, Copenhagen DK

2016

Over It, David Klein Gallery Detroit, MI

2015

Smashing, De Buck Gallery, New York, NY

2014

New Works Lieven De Buck Gallery, St Paul de Vance, France

Equal Opportunity, David Klein Gallery, Birmingham MI

2013

America's Sweetheart, De Buck Gallery, New York, NY

2012

Paper and Chalk, Skidmore Contemporary Art, Santa Monica, CA

It's All Up To You, Adler&Co, San Francisco, CA

2011

Clean, Skidmore Contemporary Art, Santa Monica, CA

New Paintings, David Klein Gallery, Birmingham, MI

Circa, Skidmore Contemporary Art, Santa Monica, CA

2010

It's My Party, Adler&Co, San Francisco, CA

I'm Not Falling For You, Skidmore Contemporary Art, Santa Monica, CA

2009

Recent Paintings, Caldwell Snyder, San Francisco, CA

Striving for Perfection, David Klein Gallery, Birmingham MI

Recent Paintings, Campton Gallery, New York, NY

2007

Recent Paintings, Caldwell Snyder, San Francisco, CA

2006

Process & Palette, Solo Show, de Soto, Los Angeles, CA

Object Lessons, Two Person Show, University Art Gallery, CSUDH, Carson, CA

2005

Good Living, de Soto, Los Angeles, CA

All Through the House, Metro Gallery Pasadena, CA

Time Line, ONE Gallery, Palms Springs, CA

2003

Lifestyle, Gallery 825, Bergamot Station, Santa Monica, CA

Three Decades of Design, Risk Art Press, West Hollywood, CA

2002

Dress, Metro Gallery, Pasadena, CA
