= List of people from Bloomfield Hills, Michigan =

The following list includes notable people who were born or have lived in Bloomfield Hills, Michigan.

== Academics and engineering ==
Name	Image	Birth	Death	Known for	Association	Reference
John DeLorean		Jan 6, 1925	Mar 19, 2005	Engineer and executive with General Motors; founder of the DeLorean Motor Company	Lived in Bloomfield Hills	
Charles and Ray Eames	Link to image	1907, 1912	1978, 1988	Designers who worked in and made major contributions to modern architecture and furniture	Lived in Bloomfield Hills (attended the Cranbrook Academy of Art)	
Florence Knoll		May 24, 1917	Jan 25, 2019	Architect and furniture designer; co-founder of the Knoll design company; furniture manufacturer	Lived in Bloomfield Hills (attended Kingswood School and the Cranbrook Academy of Art)	
Carl Milles		Jun 23, 1875	Sep 19, 1955	Swedish sculptor	Lived in Bloomfield Hills (as sculptor in residence at Cranbrook Educational Community)	
Eero Saarinen		Aug 20, 1910	Sep 1, 1961	Finnish architect and industrial designer	Grew up and lived in Bloomfield Hills; took courses and worked at Cranbrook Educational Community	
Eliel Saarinen		Aug 20, 1873	Jul 1, 1950	Finnish architect known for his work with art deco buildings	Lived and died in Bloomfield Hills	
Minoru Yamasaki		Dec 1, 1912	Feb 7, 1986	Chief architect of the World Trade Center	Lived and died in Bloomfield Hills	

== Business ==
Name	Image	Birth	Death	Known for	Association	Reference
Stan Aldridge				Owner of Indianwood Golf and Country Club; outbid for the Detroit Red Wings by Mike Ilitch	Lives in Bloomfield Hills	
George Gough Booth		Sep 24, 1864	Apr 11, 1949	Newspaper publisher (Evening News Association)	Founder of Cranbrook Educational Community in Bloomfield Hills	
John Bugas		Apr 26, 1908	Dec 2, 1982	Second in command at Ford Motor Company	Lived in Bloomfield Hills	
Philip Caldwell		Jan 27, 1920	Jul 10, 2013	President, chairman, and CEO of Ford Motor Company (the first person to run the company who was not a member of the Ford family); senior managing director at Shearson Lehman Brothers; member of the President's Export Council	Lived in Bloomfield Hills	
William Davidson		Dec 5, 1922	Mar 13, 2009	President, chairman and CEO of Guardian Industries; chairman of Guardian Industries Corp; owner of the Detroit Pistons, the Detroit Shock and the Tampa Bay Lightning sports franchises	Lived and died in Bloomfield	
Lee Iacocca		Oct 15, 1924	Jul 2, 2019	Business executive with Ford Motor Company and Chrysler	Lived in Bloomfield Hills	
Christopher Ilitch				President and CEO of Ilitch Holdings	Lives in Bloomfield Hills	
Semon Knudsen		Oct 2, 1912	Jul 6, 1998	Executive vice president of General Motors Company and president of Ford Motor Company	Lived and died in Bloomfield Hills	
Scott McNealy		Nov 13, 1954		Co-founder and CEO of Sun Microsystems	Grew up in Bloomfield Hills and attended Cranbrook Kingswood School	
Roger Penske		Feb 20, 1937		Founder of Penske Corporation and team Penske Racing auto racing		
William J. Pulte		May 16, 1932	Mar 7, 2018	Founder and chairman of Pulte Homes	Lived in Bloomfield Hills	
John Rakolta		Jun 15, 1947		CEO of Walbridge Construction	Lives in Bloomfield Hills	
Mark Spitznagel		Mar 5, 1971		Hedge fund manager	Home in Bloomfield Hills	
A. Alfred Taubman		Jan 31, 1924	Apr 17, 2015	Real estate developer (founder of Taubman Centers); philanthropist	Lived and died in Bloomfield Hills	
Robert S. Taubman		1953		Chairman, president and CEO of Taubman Centers	Lives in Bloomfield Hills	

== Media and music ==
Name	Image	Birth	Death	Known for	Association	Reference
Jessica Ashley		Dec 8, 1989		Playboy Playmate, June 2014; appeared in FHM	Grew up in Bloomfield Hills	
Paul Banks		May 3, 1978		Lead singer, lyricist and guitarist of Interpol	Grew up in Bloomfield Hills	
Selma Blair		Jun 23, 1972		Actress (Cruel Intentions, Hellboy, Legally Blonde)	Attended Cranbrook Kingswood School; grew up in Bloomfield Hills	
Rob Cantor		Aug 26, 1983		Singer and songwriter, yellow-tied vocalist and guitarist of band Tally Hall	Born and raised in Bloomfield Hills	
Aretha Franklin		Mar 25, 1942	Aug 16, 2018	Singer and songwriter	Lived in Bloomfield Hills, died in her Detroit condo	
Carolyn Franklin		May 13, 1944	Apr 25, 1988	Singer and songwriter; younger sister of Aretha Franklin	Lived and died in Bloomfield Hills	
Chris Hansen		Mar 26, 1959		Television infotainment personality (Dateline NBC, To Catch a Predator)	Attended Brother Rice High School in Bloomfield Hills	
Dana Jacobson		Nov 5, 1971		CBS anchorwoman	Attended Andover High School in Bloomfield Hills	
Cullen Landis		Jul 9, 1896	Aug 26, 1975	Motion picture actor and director whose career began in the early years of the silent film era	Lived and died in Bloomfield Hills	
Greg Mathis		Apr 5, 1960		Television personality (Judge Mathis)		
Elizabeth Reaser		Jul 2, 1975		Actress (Esme in Twilight)	Born and raised in Bloomfield Hills	
Chad Smith		Oct 25, 1961		Drummer for the Red Hot Chili Peppers	Grew up in Bloomfield Hills and attended Lahser High School	
Robin Williams		Jul 21, 1951	Aug 11, 2014	Actor and comedian (Mork & Mindy, Dead Poets Society, Mrs. Doubtfire)	Grew up in Bloomfield Hills, attended Detroit Country Day School	
Alex Winston		Sep 28, 1987		Indie pop-rock musician	Born in Bloomfield Hills	
Bob Woodruff		Aug 18, 1961		Television journalist	Born in Bloomfield Hills	
Dey Young		Jul 28, 1955		Actress and sculptor	Born in Bloomfield Hills	

== Politics and law ==
Name	Image	Birth	Death	Known for	Association	Reference
Geoffrey Fieger		Dec 23, 1950		Attorney	Lives in Bloomfield Hills	
David T. Fischer		1946		United States Ambassador to Morocco	Lives in Bloomfield Hills	
Perry Johnson		Jan 23, 1948		2024 Republican presidential candidate; 2023 Michigan gubernatorial candidate; businessman; entrepreneur	Lives in Bloomfield Hills	
Gary Peters		Dec 1, 1958		U.S. senator from Michigan; U.S. congressman from Michigan's 9th and 14th districts; state senator from Michinga's 14th Senate District	Lives in Bloomfield Hills	
George W. Romney		Jul 8, 1907	Jul 26, 1995	43rd governor of Michigan; Republican presidential candidate in 1968; father of Mitt Romney	Lived and died in Bloomfield Hills	
Mitt Romney		Mar 12, 1947		70th governor of Massachusetts; 2008 Republican presidential candidate; 2012 Republican presidential nominee, junior U.S. Senator from Utah	Grew up in Bloomfield Hills and attended Cranbrook Kingswood School	
Steve Stockman		Nov 14, 1956		U.S. congressman from Texas's 9th congressional district (1995-1997)	Born in Bloomfield Hills	

== Sports ==
=== Baseball ===
Name	Image	Birth	Death	Known for	Association	Reference
Dave Dombrowski		Jul 27, 1956		President, CEO, and general manager of the Detroit Tigers	Lives in Bloomfield Hills	
Charlie Gehringer		May 11, 1903	Jan 21, 1993	Hall of Fame second baseman for the Detroit Tigers, World Series champion (1935)	Lived and died in Bloomfield Hills	
Al Kaline		Dec 19, 1934	Apr 6, 2020	Hall of Fame outfielder for the Detroit Tigers, World Series champion (1968)	Lived and died in Bloomfield Hills	
Dave Rozema		Aug 5, 1956		Pitcher for the Detroit Tigers and Texas Rangers	Salesman for Disposal Management LLC of Bloomfield Hills	

=== Basketball ===
Name	Image	Birth	Death	Known for	Association	Reference
Joe Dumars		May 24, 1963		All-Star guard for the Detroit Pistons; two-time NBA champion (1989–1990)		
Richard Hamilton		Feb 14, 1978		All-Star shooting guard and small forward for the Washington Wizards, Detroit Pistons, and Chicago Bulls		

=== Football ===
Name	Image	Birth	Death	Known for	Association	Reference
Pete Dawkins		Mar 8, 1938		1955 Heisman Trophy winner; Rhodes Scholar; U.S. Army brigadier general	Attended Cranbrook School	

=== Hockey ===
Name	Image	Birth	Death	Known for	Association	Reference
Chris Chelios		Jan 25, 1962		Defenseman with the Montreal Canadiens, Chicago Blackhawks, and Detroit Red Wings		
Pavel Datsyuk		Jul 20, 1978		Alternate captain for the Detroit Red Wings		
Sergei Fedorov		Dec 13, 1969		Centre for the Detroit Red Wings		
Gordie Howe		Mar 31, 1928	Jun 10, 2016	Right wing for the Detroit Red Wings and Hartford Whalers		
Steve Yzerman		May 9, 1965		Centre and captain for the Detroit Red Wings; general manager for the Tampa Bay Lightning and Detroit Red Wings	Lived in Bloomfield Hills	
Henrik Zetterberg		Oct 9, 1980		Center and left wing for the Detroit Red Wings		

=== Soccer ===
Name	Image	Birth	Death	Known for	Association	Reference
Russell Cicerone		Nov 17, 1994		Forward	Born in Bloomfield Hills	

=== Tennis ===
Name	Image	Birth	Death	Known for	Association	Reference
Michael Russell		May 1, 1978		International tennis player	Grew up in Bloomfield Hills	
