= Adam E. Coffey =

American businessman and writer

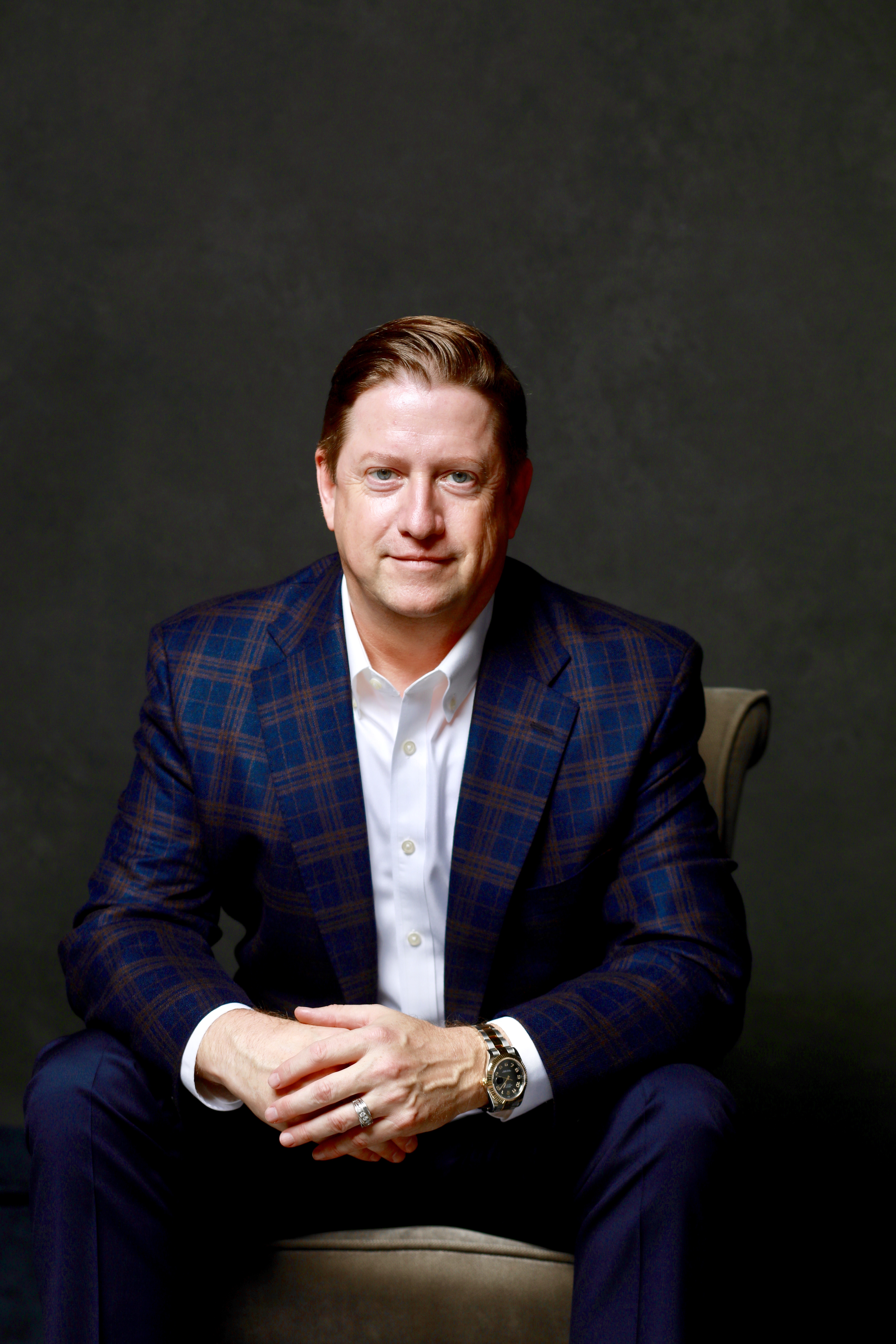
- Born: Adam E. Coffey; 1964 (age 61–62); Illinois, U.S.
- Occupations: Businessman; Author
- Employer(s): General Electric; WASH Multifamily Laundry; CoolSys
- Notable work: The Private Equity Playbook; The Exit Strategy Playbook; Empire Builder
- Website: adamecoffey.com

Adam Edward Coffey (born 1964) is an American businessman and author.

== Life ==
Coffey was born in Illinois in 1964 and grew up in Michigan. His father was a lieutenant in the U.S. Navy. After high school, Coffey enlisted in the U.S. Army and attained the rank of Sergeant. From 1982 to 1986, he served as a journeyman engineer, repairing classified AN/MPQ-49 Forward Area Alerting Radars.

After leaving the military, Coffey joined General Electric's healthcare division as an engineer and later became an executive. In 2001, Coffey joined Masterplan as president and COO. He later joined Wash Multifamily Laundry Services and served as CEO from 2003 until 2016. From 2016 to 2021, he led CoolSys.

In February 2019, Coffey published his first book, The Private Equity Playbook, which was reviewed by Kirkus Reviews in March 2019.

In September 2021, his second book, The Exit Strategy Playbook, was published. It was also reviewed by Kirkus Reviews. Coffey was named to the Orange County Business Journal's OC500 list in 2018 and 2019 and to its OC top 50 list in 2020 and 2021.

In 2021, Coffey founded The CEO Advisory Guru LLC.

== Books ==
- Coffey, Adam E. (February 2019). The Private Equity Playbook
- Coffey, Adam E. (September 2021). The Exit Strategy Playbook
- Coffey, Adam E. (October 2023). Empire Builder
