= Royal Park Hotel (Rochester, Michigan) =

Hotel in Rochester, United States

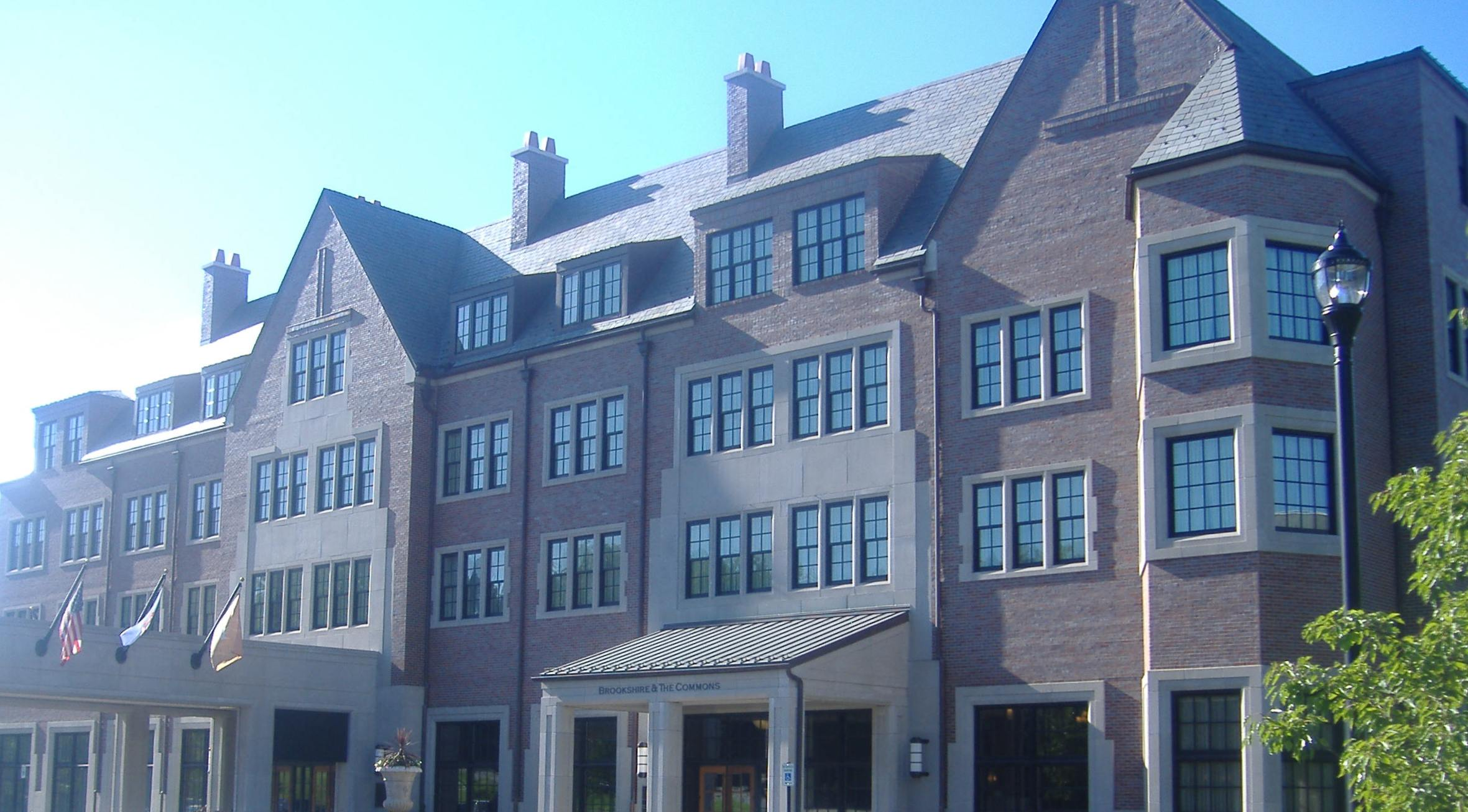
- Interactive map of the Royal Park Hotel area
- Hotel chain: Carino Hotels & Resorts

General information
- Location: United States, 600 East University Drive; Rochester, Michigan
- Coordinates: 42.6816°N 83.1288°W
- Opening: 2004

Design and construction
- Architect: Victor Saroki

Other information
- Number of rooms: 143
- Parking: Valet parking available

Website
- Royal Park Hotel

The Royal Park Hotel is a luxury boutique hotel located in Rochester, Michigan. Architect Victor Saroki designed the hotel in a stately English manor house style. The hotel contains the newly renovated PARK 600 bar + kitchen. In addition, the hotel ballroom can accommodate conferences for up to 1,200 guests and dining for up to 720. Royal Park Hotel is a member of World Hotels.

== History ==
Several celebrities have stayed there, including Paul McCartney, Hugh Hefner, Taylor Swift, and former president George W. Bush (while seeking re-election). The hotel has received the Triple A four diamond award.
