= USS Burdo =

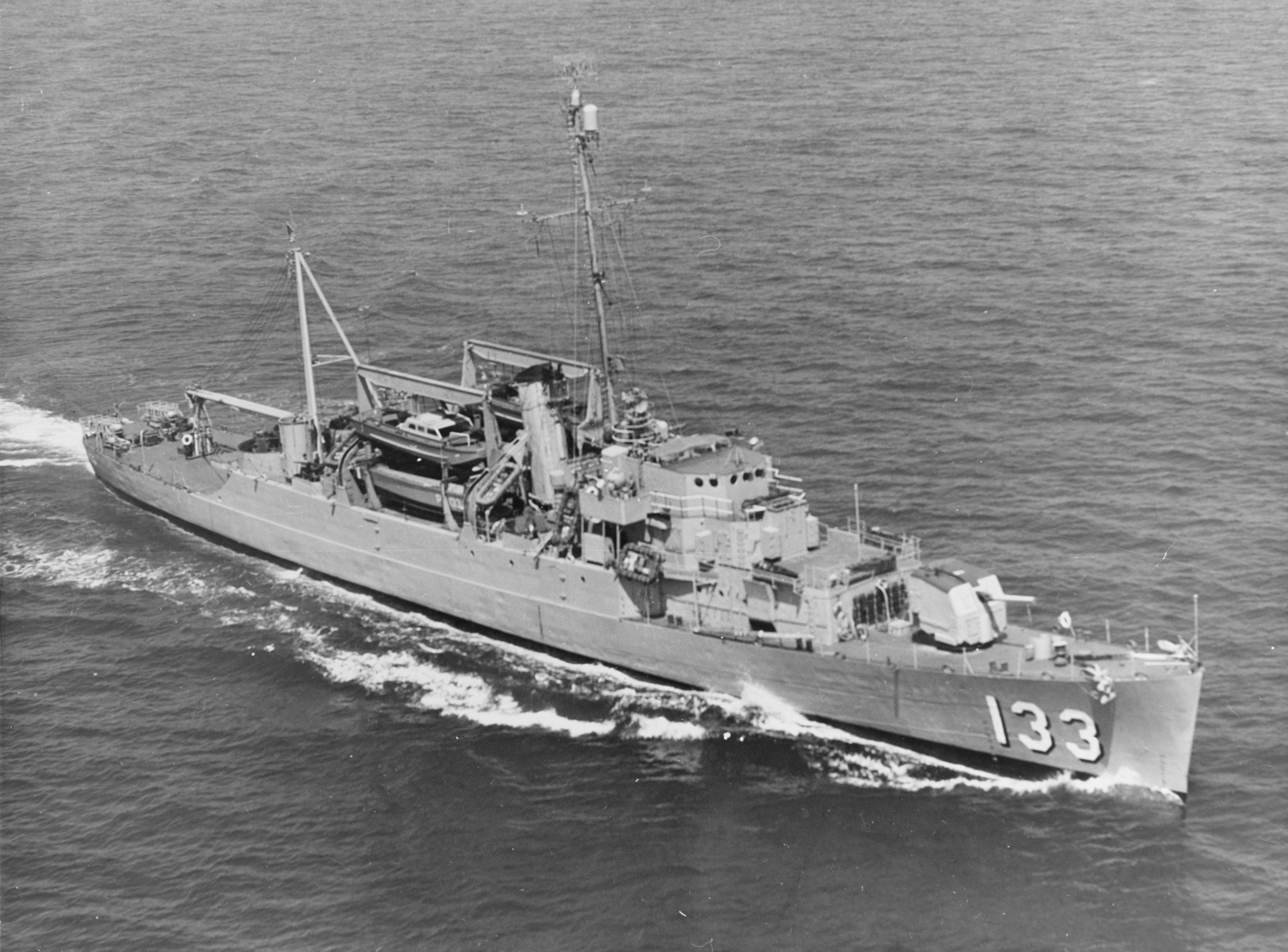

History

United States
- Name: USS Burdo
- Namesake: Ronald A. Burdo
- Ordered: 1942
- Builder: Defoe Shipbuilding Company, Bay City, Michigan
- Laid down: 1944
- Launched: 25 November 1944
- Commissioned: 2 June 1945
- Decommissioned: 28 February 1958
- Stricken: 1 April 1966
- Fate: Sold for scrap, 30 March 1967

General characteristics
- Class & type: Crosley-class high speed transport
- Displacement: 1,450 long tons (1,473 t)
- Length: 306 ft (93 m)
- Beam: 36 ft 10 in (11.23 m)
- Draft: 13 ft 6 in (4.11 m)
- Propulsion: 2 × Combustion Engineering DR boilers; Turbo-electric drive with 2 × General Electric steam turbines; 2 × solid manganese-bronze 3600 lb. 3-bladed propellers, 8 ft 6 in (2.59 m), 7 ft 7 in (2.31 m) pitch; 12,000 hp (8.9 MW); 2 rudders; 359 tons fuel oil
- Speed: 23 knots (43 km/h; 26 mph)
- Range: 3,700 nmi (6,900 km) at 15 kn (28 km/h; 17 mph); 6,000 nmi (11,000 km) at 12 kn (22 km/h; 14 mph)
- Boats & landing craft carried: 4 × LCVPs
- Troops: 162 troops
- Complement: 204 (12 officers, 192 enlisted)
- Armament: 1 × 5"/38 caliber gun; 3 × twin 40 mm guns; 6 × single 20 mm guns; 2 × depth charge tracks

USS Burdo (APD-133) was a Crosley-class high speed transport of the United States Navy, in service from 1945 to 1958. She was finally sold for scrap in 1967. Burdo was named after Private Ronald A. Burdo (1920–1942), a Marine who was killed in action at Gavutu, during the Battle of Guadalcanal.

== Namesake ==
Ronald Allen Burdo was born on 24 July 1920 in Cheboygan, Michigan. He enlisted in the United States Marine Corps on 20 September 1940. He was killed in action on 7 August 1942 at Gavutu, Solomon Islands, during the Battle of Guadalcanal.

== History ==
Originally designated a Rudderow-class destroyer escort, DE-717, Burdo was re-designated as APD-133, a fast transport, on 17 July 1944, even before being laid down at the Defoe Shipbuilding Company, in Bay City, Michigan. She was launched on 25 November 1944, sponsored by Mrs. Ida J. Botts, mother of Private Burdo. Builders trials before her pre-commissioning cruise were done in Lake Huron.

After completion, Burdo sailed from the builder's yard at Bay City to Chicago, Illinois. From there, they went through the Chicago Sanitary and Ship Canal and down the Chicago River to Joliet, Illinois, where pontoons were attached to the ship so it could be pushed down the Des Plaines River, Illinois River, and Mississippi River as part of a barge train. After arriving at the Todd Johnson Shipyard in Algiers, Louisiana, on the west bank of the Mississippi at New Orleans, the rest of the crew reported aboard, and Burdo was commissioned at New Orleans, on 2 June 1945.

=== Service history ===
Burdo joined the Pacific Fleet in August 1945, and was assigned to serve with the Pacific Underwater Demolition Flotilla. With Underwater Demolition Team 18(UDT-18) embarked, she sailed for Pearl Harbor on 16 August, where she was assigned to an amphibious group. On 1 September, she departed for Sasebo, Japan. At Sasebo, UDT-13 assisted in clearing channels prior to landing the occupation forces on 21 September 1945. Shortly afterwards, Burdo departed for San Diego via Okinawa, Guam, and Pearl Harbor. At San Diego, UDT-18 was disembarked, and after one shuttle trip to Pearl Harbor, Burdo sailed to Norfolk, Virginia, transiting the Panama Canal on Thanksgiving Day 1945.

Burdo operated along the Atlantic coast carrying out training exercises and mock landings during December 1945 through October 1948, with the exception of three trips to the Caribbean. On 1 November 1948, in company with other units of the Atlantic Fleet, Burdo departed Norfolk en route to NS Argentia, Newfoundland, for cold weather operations. On 20 November, she returned to Norfolk and continued with her Atlantic and Caribbean operations until May 1951.

In May 1951, she became a unit of the Midshipmen Practice Squadron, and participated in the midshipmen summer cruise to northern Europe and the Caribbean, returning to Norfolk at the end of July. After overhaul, she resumed training exercises in cooperation with the Marines. Early in January 1953, Burdo was assigned to the 6th Fleet, and operated as a unit of the Amphibious Group until May 1953. During this assignment, she participated in one of the first NATO exercises.

Over the next several years, Burdo engaged in amphibious operational training along the eastern seaboard, conducted six Caribbean training cruises, and had another to ur with the 6th Fleet.

=== Decommissioning and sale ===
Burdo was decommissioned on 28 February 1958, at Charleston, South Carolina, and was laid up in the Atlantic Reserve Fleet. She was struck from the Naval Vessel Register on 1 April 1966, and sold for scrapping on 30 March 1967, to Southern Scrap Material Company, New Orleans, Louisiana.
