= Allie McGhee =

American artist

Allie McGhee (born in 1941, in Charleston, West Virginia) is a Detroit-based African American painter and pillar of the Detroit art community since the 1960s. Allie McGhee attended Cass Technical High School in Detroit, MI, and completed his undergraduate work at Eastern Michigan University in 1965.

McGhee’s paintings are lyrical, material-driven works rendered in swirling constellations of industrial paint and found media. Drawing inspiration from African cosmology, African symbolism, and free jazz, his work explores the inherent tensions between spontaneity and premeditation, intention and accident. McGhee’s art practice features painting and sculpture, consisting of collage, drape, and still compositions that enclose the spellbinding visuals of colors merging in a fusion of stains, dashes, and waves. A signature style of McGhee’s includes his Crushed Paintings, in which the artist turns compositions on vinyl, canvas or paper into amorphous forms.

McGhee comes from the same school of Black abstract painters which includes Sam Gilliam, Ed Clark, Jack Whitten, and McArthur Binion. His work is included in collections at the Detroit Institute of Arts, St. Louis Museum of Art, and the Studio Museum in Harlem, among other institutions.

== Biography ==
From an early age, Allie McGhee displayed an adamant interest in art-marking. With his mother’s encouragement, McGhee converted his family’s basement into his first artist studio. McGhee was heavily drawn to the Cubist Art period, and spent his childhood mimicking painters such as George Braque. Concurrent with his art-making process, McGhee developed a daily ritual of playing music whenever he practiced in the studio – an early indication of the artist's potent relationship between art and music.

In 1969, his friend and mentor Charles McGee curated a show at the Detroit Artist Market entitled "Seven Black Artists," which included Charles McGee himself, Allie, Harold Neal, Lester Johnson, Henri Umbaji King, Robert Murray, James Lee, and Robert J. Stull. The group would later form Gallery 7, a collective and gallery space located on 8232 West McNichols. There Allie McGhee taught art classes to youth.

Eventually, Allie McGhee became interested in themes related to science, and space exploration. He followed photographic captures from space study taken by the Hubble Telescope, creating paintings that are inspired by astrological forms.

== Influences ==
Prior to the 1960s, artworks by Allie McGhee were primarily figurative before he transitioned to abstract painting. The 1967 Detroit Riots and the influx of experimental jazz music inspired the artist to engage with history, improvisation, and science through abstraction. McGhee grew weary of the limits of figurative painting while the Black Arts Movement called upon Black artists to contribute to the revolution by embodying a progressive, avant-garde, afrocentric visual, linguistic, and sonic aesthetic to help shape postmodern Black culture. Artworks such asBlack Attack, (1967), encapsulates a period of radical uproar, while artworks like Night Ritual, (1991) depicts a universal approach to pure abstraction. McGhee's study of the universal plane began as an inclination to document the micro and macro expressions of nature, through recurring symbols such as the line and curve. Which results in a picture plane of marks resembling prehistoric cave paintings and imagery that recalls the celestial sky.

== Exhibition history ==
Under-recognized throughout much of his career, McGhee’s work was the subject of a major retrospective, Banana Moon Horn, which opened October 2021 at Cranbrook Art Museum, Bloomfield Hills, MI. Most recently, his work has been the subject of solo presentations: Allie McGhee: Parallax, Harper's, New York (2022); Allie McGhee: The Ritual of The Mask, Belle Isle Viewing Room, Detroit (2021); Allie McGhee, Hill Gallery, Birmingham, MI (2019); and Cosmic Images 2000, University of Michigan, Ann Arbor (2018). In the last decade alone, McGhee’s work was chronicled by major group exhibitions including Harold Neal and Detroit African American Artists, 1945 Through the Black Arts Movement, Wayne State University, Detroit, and Eastern Michigan University, Ypsilanti, MI (2021); Enunciated Life, California African American Museum, Los Angeles (2021); Landlord Colors, Cranbrook Art Museum, Bloomfield Hills (2019); Art of the Rebellion: Black Art of the Civil Rights Movement, Detroit Institute of Arts, Detroit (2017); and Ménage a Detroit: Three Generations of Detroit Expressionist Art, 1970-2012, N’Namdi Center for Contemporary Art, Detroit (2012). His work is included in numerous public collections including Detroit Institute of Arts, Detroit; Institute of Contemporary Art, Miami; Mott-Warsh Collection, Flint, MI; St. Louis Museum of Art, St. Louis; Studio Museum in Harlem, New York; and Toyota City Hall, Toyota, JP. McGhee is represented by Harper’s.

== Public collections ==
- Barfield Companies, Livonia, MI
- Detroit Council of the Arts, Detroit, MI
- Detroit Institute of Arts, Detroit, MI
- Eastern Michigan University, Ypsilanti, MI
- Fondazione Imago Mundi, Treviso, IT
- Henry Ford Hospital, Detroit, MI
- Hooven-Dayton Corporation, Dayton, OH
- Institute of Contemporary Art, Miami, FL
- Koichiro Iwasaki, Kagoshima, JP
- Martin Luther King Center, Detroit, MI
- Kohler Corporation, Kohler, WI
- Morgan State University, Baltimore, MD
- Mott-Warsh Collections, Flint, MI
- St Louis Museum of Art, St. Louis, MO
- The Studio Museum in Harlem, New York, NY
- The T.L.C Beatrice Food International, New York, NY
- Toyota City Hall, Toyota, JP
- Washington State University, Seattle, WA
- Your Heritage House, Detroit, MI
