= LeRoy Foster (artist) =

American painter (1925–1993)

- Born: May 8, 1925; Detroit, Michigan, U.S.
- Died: March 23, 1993 (aged 67); Detroit, Michigan, U.S.
- Occupation: artist

LeRoy Foster (1925–1993) was an American painter from Detroit, Michigan. He is best known for the large murals he painted on the walls of Detroit institutions, such as “The Life & Times of Frederick Douglass,” at the Detroit Public Library’s Frederick Douglass Branch, and “Renaissance City,” at Cass Technical High School. He also painted portraits of prominent figures like singer and civil rights activist Paul Robeson.

== Biography ==
Foster was born in Detroit on May 8, 1925 to Combee and Marie Coleman Foster, and lived there his entire life, except for a brief time when he studied art in Europe in the 1940s.

Foster began drawing at age five or six, and was an exceptional art student, recognized by teachers and peers at an early age. “I was nice up until I was 12,” he recalled, “then all hell broke loose. I was possessed by demons...and one way to exorcise those demons was to paint.” In 1939, at age 14, he won first prize at an exhibition of the Pen and Palette Club, a training and studio space for black artists sponsored by the Detroit Urban League. He was the youngest member.

At the Pen and Palette Club, Foster studied with Hungarian artist Francis de Erdely, who was renowned for his skill in figure drawing. Foster went to Cass Technical High School and also studied at Cranbrook Academy of Art in Bloomfield Hills. Through the help of his teachers at Cass, he received a scholarship to study at the Society of Arts and Crafts (now the College for Creative Studies), where he studied under painter Sarkis Sarkisian. After that, Foster spent time studying in Europe, at the Académie de la Grande Chaumière in Paris, and the Heatherley School of Fine Art in London.

Foster was gay, and according to friends was “frank about his sexual persuasion,” despite the hostility towards homosexuality at the time. Several younger artists remember him as a positive role model, and parties that he threw at his studio were widely attended. Also, one of his good friends and patrons was Ruth Ellis, notable Detroit LGBT activist.

== Arts career ==
Foster has been referred to as “Detroit’s Own Michelangelo,” and was considered by friends to be “the dean of black artists in Detroit” at the time. He came to be known around the city as an artist with a mastery of human anatomy, an excellent portrait painter, and, perhaps most widely acknowledged, a public muralist with a commitment to African-American history and culture.

In 1958, Foster helped found, with artists Charles McGee and Henri Umbaji King, the Contemporary Studio on the John C. Lodge Expressway. The popular studio, part of a burgeoning network of local black artists, was the brainchild of Henri King and Harold Neal, along with 15 other artists, many of them alumni of the Society of Arts and Crafts. Foster’s time studying at the Society under Sarkis Sarkisian linked him with many of Detroit’s most active black artists who Sarkisian had also mentored.

In 1965, Dr. Charles H. Wright, who would become Foster’s friend and patron, established the International Afro-American Museum (now the Charles H. Wright Museum of African American History), where Foster would serve as Artist-in-Residence.

By 1962, the Negro Digest reported that LeRoy Foster had already won four prizes at the annual Michigan Artists Exhibition at the Detroit Art Institute and had sold more than two hundred paintings. In 1968, Foster was featured in a traveling exhibit at the Detroit Institute of Art, alongside other prominent African-American artists such as Ernest G. Alston, sculptor Oscar M. Graves and Hughie Lee-Smith.

In 1972 Foster painted one of his most well-known murals, the 10’ x 12’ “Life and Times of Frederick Douglass,” which was installed the next year in the Frederick Douglass branch of the Detroit Public Library. The painting is based on the 1859 meeting in Detroit of Frederick Douglass and John Brown, shortly before Brown’s raid on Harper’s Ferry, and also portrays Douglass’s life at several different stages. The mural was heavily influenced by Michelangelo’s Sistine Chapel fresco, and also features a portrait of Foster himself attending the meeting.

Foster went on to paint other prominent murals in Detroit, including “Kaleidoscope,” commissioned for the Southwest Detroit Hospital in 1976, and his 18’ x 20’ “Renaissance City,” at Cass Technical High School, made in 1979, which depicts the city rising from the ashes of the 1967 riots.

In 1978, Foster made a series of paintings commemorating Paul Robeson’s 80th birthday. His friend Leno Jaxon, founder of American Black Artists, Inc. and first director of the Afro-American Museum, once attempted to convince the Detroit Institute of Art to show the work, but it was rejected, generating controversy.

In 1981, Foster's art work was included in the exhibit "Prominent Black Artists, Past and Present" at the Karamu House and Renaissance Galleries in Cleveland, Ohio.

In 1985, “Renaissance City” was vandalized, and only a few months afterward Foster’s home and studio burned down. Friends and fellow artists, spearhead by Dr. Charles Wright, organized donations and an art auction to support Foster and pay for the restoration of the mural, which was completed in 1986. At the celebration for the restoration, Detroit Free Press columnist Susan Watson called Foster a “genius.”

In 1990, towards the end of Foster’s life, Leno Jaxon organized a showing of his work at American Black Artists, Inc. Also in 1990, Foster signed the second floor beam in the Scarab Club, a longtime institution of Detroit artists.

== Students ==
Detroit native and former Michigan Chronicle illustrator Telitha Cumi Bowens was a protege of LeRoy Foster.

== Death ==
Foster suffered from diabetes and his deteriorating health resulted in blindness and loss of his legs. He died of kidney failure on March 23, 1993, at Grace Hospital in Detroit.

== Noted works ==
- Nobody Knows the Trouble I've Seen (Self-Portrait). Oil on canvas, circa 1942. Made in high school, when Foster was 17. Sold at auction on Feb 19, 2008 at Swann Galleries for $8400.
- Summer River. Early watercolor, circa 1948. Depicts young artist with a friend. Sold at auction on Feb 6, 2007 at Swann Galleries for $9,600.
- Frederick Douglass, mural, Detroit Public Library, 1971
- Illustrations for Aloneness by Gwendolyn Brooks, Broadside Press, 1971
- Book cover, portrait of Paul Robeson for The Peace Advocacy of Paul Robeson by Charles H. Wright, M.D., 1984
- Conspirators at Harper's Ferry mural, featuring John Brown, Frederick Douglass, and Harriet Tubman in the courtroom of Detroit's Recorders Court Judge George W. Crockett, Jr.
- Kaleidoscope, a 9' x 28' mural in the lobby of Southwest Detroit Hospital, a commission was a joint venture between the medical staff of Boulevard General Hospital and managers of Southwest Detroit Hospital.

== Collections ==
- The Charles H. Wright Museum of African American History

== In popular culture ==
In 2018, Detroit artist, professional set designer and Season 1 Skin Wars contestant Felle Kelsaw created a public mural titled "LeRoy the King" honoring Foster. The 100 foot long mural is located at Market on the Avenue, a community space, on Livernois Avenue across from the University of Detroit Mercy, and near where Foster once lived.

== External references ==
- LeRoy Foster on the African American Visual Artists Database
