= Nick Sousanis =

American scholar, art critic, and cartoonist

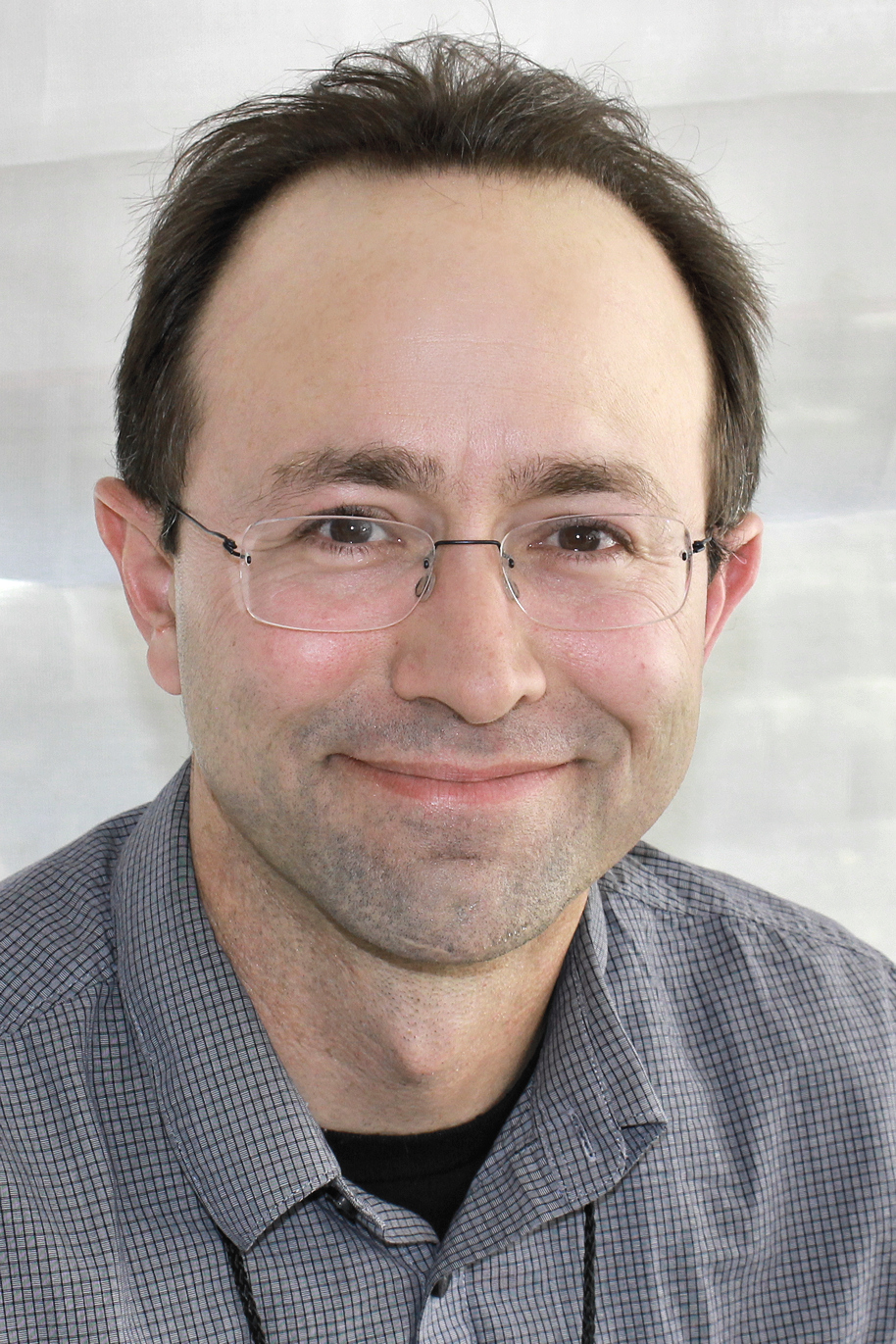
- Sousanis at the 2015 Texas Book Festival.
- Born: Walter Nickell Sousanis; Michigan
- Education: B.A., Western Michigan University; Ed.D., Teachers College, Columbia University
- Occupations: Cartoonist, scholar, teacher, art critic
- Known for: TheDetroiter.com; Unflattening
- Website: http://spinweaveandcut.com/

Walter Nickell "Nick" Sousanis is an American scholar, art critic, and cartoonist; a co-founder of the TheDetroiter.com, he is also the first person at Columbia University to write a dissertation entirely in a comic book format.

Sousanis believes that comics are powerful teaching tools and has developed courses on comics at Teachers College and Parsons. In addition to his classroom teaching, Sousanis' artwork has been exhibited in such venues as Microsoft Research in Seattle. He publishes articles on teaching with comics in the Journal of Curriculum and Pedagogy and other venues. In addition to publishing, Sousanis has spoken at symposiums and conferences around the world. The noteworthiness of Sousanis' contribution to the field of academics has been discussed in Inside Higher Ed and The Chronicle of Higher Education.

== Biography ==
A former professional tennis player and instructor, Sousanis majored in mathematics at Western Michigan University.

Sousanis and his brother John Sousanis co-founded thedetroiter.com in October 2002, where he served as editor in chief. He also contributed arts coverage for the Detroit Metro Times. He became the biographer of legendary Detroit artist Charles McGee.

While he was living in Detroit, Sousanis' own artwork appeared in a number of shows in the Detroit area, including a billboard for the Ferndale, Michigan Public Art Project. and he served as a board member and, for a period, the chairman of the non-profit arts organization Contemporary Art Institute of Detroit (CAID). In recognition of his accomplishments in the arts community of Southeastern Michigan, Sousanis was selected as one of Crain's Detroit Business's "40 under 40" for 2006. In 2007, Sousanis was appointed the founding Director of Exhibitions for Work @ Detroit, an exhibition space in Detroit operated by the University of Michigan School of Art & Design.

In early 2008, Sousanis moved from Detroit to New York City to pursue a Doctorate of Education in Interdisciplinary Studies at Columbia University's Teachers College. At that point TheDetroiter.com was sold to the YMCA.

In 2011, Sousanis organized the 2011 Game Show NYC. Talks were given by Maxine Greene, Tony Wagner, Fred Goodman, and Donald Brinkman at the concurrent conference for Creativity, Play, and Imagination Across Disciplines.

Sousanis defended his dissertation, titled "Unflattening: A Visual-Verbal Inquiry into Learning in Many Dimensions," at Teachers College, Columbia University in May 2014. His dissertation was published by Harvard University Press in April 2015 as Unflattening; the New York Times called it:

a genuine oddity, a philosophical treatise in comics form. 'Flatness,' for Sousanis's purposes, is not the quality of abstraction that Clement Greenberg lauded in modern art, but the lamentable condition of the inhabitants of Edwin A. Abbott's 'Flatland': the inability to understand that there might be more than one can immediately perceive. The solution he proposes is admitting visual elements, and especially drawings, into the intellectual domain of language. (Psst — he's talking about comics!)"

Unflattening won the 2015 Lynd Ward Graphic Novel Prize, taking top honor as book of the year.

In 2015, Sousanis accepted a post-doctoral fellowship at the University of Calgary, where he taught about comics. In Fall 2016, joined the School of Humanities and Liberal Studies at San Francisco State University as an assistant professor.

In 2018, Sousanis won the Eisner Award for Best Short Story for "A Life in Comics: The Graphic Adventures of Karen Green".

Sousanis has contributed substantially to the theory and practice of comics-based research and teaching with comics.
