= Sousanis =

Sousanis is a surname. Notable people with the surname include:

- John Sousanis, American publisher, entertainment writer, theater critic, and columnist
- Nick Sousanis, American scholar, art critic, and cartoonist
