= Thomas Wilcher =

American football player and hurdler

No. 27
- Position: Running back

Personal information
- Listed height: 6 ft 0 in (1.83 m)
- Listed weight: 185 lb (84 kg)

Career information
- College: Michigan Wolverines (1983–1986)

Awards and highlights
- Big Ten champion (1986); 3× MHSAA champion coach (2011–2012, 2016); Detroit Free Press High School Coach of the Year (1998)

Other information
- Sports career
- Nationality: American
- Years active: 1983–1986
- Employer: Michigan State Spartans football
- Spouse: Crystal Wilcher
- Children: 3
- Sport: Indoor and outdoor track
- Races: 55-m hurdles; 60-m hurdles; 110-m hurdles
- University team: Michigan Wolverines
- Association and division: NCAA Division I
Medal summary and career highlights
Representing Michigan Wolverines/Big Ten
NCAA Outdoor Championships
Bronze medal – third place	1985 Austin	110 m hurdles
NCAA Indoor Championships
Gold medal – first place	1986 Oklahoma City	55 m hurdles
By race
Event	1st	2nd	3rd
55m hurdles	1	0	0
110 m hurdles	0	0	1
Total	1	0	1
By event
Event	1st	2nd	3rd
NCAA Outdoor Championships	0	0	1
NCAA Indoor Championships	1	0	0
Total	1	0	1
Career highlights
- NCAA indoor 55-meter hurdles champion (1986)
- Big Ten outdoor 110-meter hurdles champion (1987)
- 2× outdoor track All-American (1985–1986)
- Indoor track All-American (1986)
- Michigan Wolverines all-time records set in 60-meter high hurdles (1986)† and 110-meter hurdles (1985)†
- University of Michigan home building record set in 60-meter high hurdles (1986)†
- Junior Olympics 110-meter hurdles champion (1981)
- 2× Michigan High School Track and Cross-Country Athlete of the Year (1981–1982)
- 10× MHSAA champion athlete (1980–1982)
- MHSAA all-time records set in 110-meter hurdles (1981) and 110-meter hurdles in a championship meet (1982)†
- 3× MHSAA champion coach (1994–1996)
† remains current record holder

Thomas Wilcher (born 11 April 1964) is a college football administrator for Michigan State University and former high school athletic coach and teacher as well as a former National Collegiate Athletic Association (NCAA) Division I track and field and college football athlete for the University of Michigan. He was the NCAA Division I Men's Indoor Track and Field Championships national champion in the indoor 55 m hurdles and a three-time NCAA All-American in track and field (once indoor and twice outdoor). Wilcher was also a running back for the Michigan Wolverines football team from 1983–1986. In his redshirt senior year, he was a member of the Big Ten Conference football champion team as well as a 110 m hurdles Big Ten individual champion. Wilcher was a 9th round selection (226th overall) by the San Diego Chargers in the 1987 NFL draft.

In high school, Wilcher was a Michigan High School Athletic Association (MHSAA) record-setting hurdler and four-time All-American. As an athlete, he is a ten-time MHSAA track and field champion and a two-time Michigan High School Track and Cross Country Athlete of the Year award winner. He was also a Junior Olympics champion in the 110 m hurdles and an All-state and All-American tailback in football. He was also an All-City swimmer.

As of 2017, Wilcher is the head coach for the football team and the boys' track & field team as well as the physical education teacher at Cass Technical High School in Detroit. As a boys' track coach, he is a three-time MHSAA team track and field champion, and his school has also twice been the MHSAA runner up. In his role as a football coach, he is a three-time MHSAA Division 1 champion and a former Detroit Free Press Coach of the Year who has produced five players who have been selected in the NFL draft.

== High school ==
At Detroit Central High School, in track and field, he was a four-time All-American, ten-time MHSAA champion (three-time team, four-time relay, three-time individual) and Michigan High School Track and Cross Country Athlete of the Year award winner in both 1981 and 1982. He led Detroit Central to three consecutive state MHSAA Class A championships as a team from 1980–1982. As a sophomore in 1980, he was the anchor of the Class A state champion 4 × 440 yard relay race team. As a junior in 1981, he won the MHSAA Class A 120-yard (110 m) high hurdles, as well as participated on the 4 × 440 and 4 × 110 MHSAA champions. As a senior, he won both the low hurdles (300 m) and high hurdles (110 m) as well as participated on the state champion 4 × 100 meter MHSAA champions. His time of 13.5 in the 110 metre hurdles was the state all class record from 1981–1986 and continues to be tied for the second fastest time in state high school history. His 1982 time of 13.6 seconds continues to be the fastest 110 meter hurdles time ever run at the MHSAA state championship meet. Although not officially recognized as a record due to metric conversions from yards to meters, the 1982 time of 41.7 in the 4 × 100 is considered indistinguishable from the official record and is described as a notable performance according to state records.

Nationally, he was the number one ranked scholastic high hurdler as a junior as well as the number one ranked long (low) hurdler as a senior and was undefeated by high school athletes in both years in the respective events. As a junior, he won the 1981 AAU Junior Olympic Games in the high hurdles (By some accounts he was an AAU Junior champion in 1982). As a senior, he won the International Prep and Golden West low hurdle races. He was timed as fast as 13.48 seconds and 13.28 (wind-aided). In addition to his track accolades, he was an All-state and All-American tailback and All-City swimmer.

Some sources regard his 13.2 time in the 1982 AAU Junior Olympic Men 110 Meter Hurdles Young event a national record as of May 2013. As of 2009, the AAU considered it to be the national record. However, as of 2013, AAU regarded Booker Nunley's July 27, 2008 13.41 time to be the junior Olympic record for the newly named 17-18 division (which was said to be formerly known as the Young division).

== College ==
Wilcher was recruited to the University of Michigan by Thomas E. Moss Sr., the former Deputy Chief of Police for the Detroit Police Department. In 1986, he won the NCAA indoor 55 meter hurdles Championship, and he placed fifth in the NCAA outdoor 110 m hurdles with a time of 13.57, earning both indoor and outdoor track & field All-American honors. He had also placed third in the outdoor 110 m hurdles in 1985 earning All-American honors. In 1987, he was the outdoor Big Ten Conference 110 meter hurdles champion and earned first team All-Big Ten honors. Wilcher holds numerous Michigan Wolverines records in the high hurdles including both the team indoor 60 meters (converted), team outdoor 110 meters, and Michigan indoor track building records. Wilcher's personal best and team record time of 13.52 seconds in the 110 meter hurdles came at the 1985 Penn Relays where he was also the event champion. He was the Big Ten winter sports athlete of the week in January 1986 for his hurdling performance.

In February 1985, Wilcher was involved in an altercation stemming from an intramural basketball game. Thomas Wilcher incurred penalties of 72 hours of public service deferred sentence, US$429 court costs and restitution in Ann Arbor District Court.

Wilcher, who wore #27 as a 6-foot (1.8 m) 185-pound (84 kg; 13.2 st) Wolverine, redshirted as a true freshman in 1982 and played sparingly in his second and third seasons. He earned varsity letters in football as a redshirt junior and redshirt senior for coach Bo Schembechler. He totaled 758 yards (693 m) rushing and eight touchdowns as a tailback in the same backfield as Jamie Morris. However, he never caught a pass. In his final season, he totaled 397 rushing yards and six touchdowns. That year, he was a member of the 1986 Big Ten Conference football champions who went on to the 1987 Rose Bowl, but accumulated no statistics in the Rose Bowl. He accumulated statistics in eleven of the thirteen games played and started twice. He had also started one game in 1985. In his best games, he rushed for 104 yards (95 m) and a touchdown on 16 carries in a 34–3 win against the South Carolina Gamecocks football team on September 21, 1985, and he rushed for two touchdowns and 74 yards (68 m) in Morris' absence in a 34–17 win against the Wisconsin Badgers football team on October 4, 1986. His touchdowns were the first two in what became Schembechler's 200th victory. On September 27, 1986, his seven-yard (6 m) touchdown run cemented a homecoming victory against the Florida State Seminoles football team by putting the team up 20–10 with 1:27 remaining.

A ninth round selection, Wilcher was the first member of the San Diego Chargers 1987 draft class to sign with the team. After graduating, Wilcher competed for the University of Chicago Track Club while training for the United States Olympic Trials for the 1988 Summer Olympic Games. On May 8, 1988, he won the Jesse Owens Classic with a 110-meter high hurdles time of 13.70. At the Olympic Trials on July 23, 1988, at Indiana University Track and Field Stadium, his second-round heat included Arthur Blake, Jack Pierce, and Greg Foster who placed first, second and third respectively as well as Tony Dees.

== Coaching ==
=== High School ===
Wilcher is the former football head coach at Cass Technical High School in Detroit, where entering the 2011 MHSAA semifinals, the team had compiled a 99–56 (.639) record and competed in the MHSAA Class-A playoffs ten times since he became head coach in 1997. He was the 1998 Detroit Free Press High School Football Coach of the Year, with his Detroit City Class-A runner-up team. At Cass, some of his athletes have included Vernon Gholston, and Marko Cooper, who was 1999 All-USA second team. One of the first star players he coached (as an assistant coach) was future Michigan Wolverines-leading rusher and NFL-athlete Clarence Williams. In 2007, Joseph Barksdale was the Detroit News' No. 1 Blue Chip Prospect, Parade All-American, U.S. Army All-American Bowl Participant (East Roster), USA Today All-USA High School First Team, The ESPN.com 150, Rivals.com Top 100 for 2007, Scout.com Hot 100 for 2007, and SuperPrep All-American. William Campbell also made the NFL.

The 2010 team went 12–1 and lost 24–21 in the MHSAA Division I semifinals, when they fumbled on the 6-yard line on second-and-4 with less than a minute remaining. The 2011 team won the state Division 1 championship by 49–13 margin against Detroit Catholic Central High School at Ford Field with a freshman quarterback, Jayru Campbell, who also plays basketball and runs track. The 2012 team won the third consecutive district championship and qualified for the state Division I championships. The 2012 team defended their championship by defeating Detroit Catholic Central High School 36–21 at Ford Field in a rematch of the prior year's state championship match. The 2011 and 2012 state champions had a defensive backfield with future Michigan Wolverine and NFL players Jourdan Lewis and Lano Hill. In 2013, Detroit Catholic Central upset Cass Tech in the state semifinals by a 28–0 score. The following year, Saline High School upset Cass Tech in the 2014 state semifinals 30–15. In 2015, Cass tech reached the 2015 MHSAA Division 1 state final game at Ford Field, but lost to Romeo High School after losing starting quarterback Rodney Hall earlier in the playoffs. In 2016 with Hall at quarterback, Cass Tech went undefeated to win the MHSAA Division 1 state championship over Detroit Catholic again. In 2017, Cass Tech lost to West Bloomfield High School in the MHSAA Division I semifinals.

Wilcher is also the Cass boys' track and field coach. The team won the MHSAA Class A track and field championships in 1994, 1995, and 1996 under Wilcher. The team was state runner up in the MHSAA Lower Peninsula Division 1 Championships in 2001 and 2002. Among the track athletes he has trained are NCAA All-American Pierre Vinson, and current Michigan Wolverine, Nick McCampbell.

==== NFL draftees ====
Cass Tech's 8 NFL draftees between 2006 and 2021 was the most by any school in the state.

Year	Rnd.	Pick #	NFL team	Player	Pos.	College	Conf.
2008	1	6	New York Jets	Vernon Gholston	DE	Ohio State	Big Ten
2011	3	92	Oakland Raiders	Joseph Barksdale	OT	LSU	SEC
2013	6	178	New York Jets	William Campbell	G	Michigan	Big Ten
2017	3	92	Dallas Cowboys	Jourdan Lewis	CB	Michigan	Big Ten
2017	3	95	Seattle Seahawks	Lano Hill	S	Michigan	Big Ten
2019	7	218	Dallas Cowboys	Mike Weber	RB	Ohio State	Big Ten
2020	6	182	New England Patriots	Michael Onwenu	G	Michigan	Big Ten
2020	6	187	Cleveland Browns	Donovan Peoples-Jones	WR	Michigan	Big Ten

==== Vernon Gholston ====
Vernon Gholston did not play football at Cass until his sophomore year and did not play on defense (at linebacker) until his senior year. Gholston did not even see himself as a football player when he was in high school, yet he has gone on to become an Ohio State Buckeyes football defensive end, the 2007 Big Ten Conference Defensive lineman of the year and the sixth overall selection in the 2008 NFL draft. According to Gholston, "It was between periods and I was going to my next class. . . .He thought I was actually somebody’s father walking down the hall. He asked me whom was I looking for. I was like, 'Nobody. I go here.' He really couldn't believe it. He kind of grabbed me at that point and put me on the team."

A similar, although more indepth, story of the recruitment of Gholston has been told by Wilcher: "He was walking down the hall with a Bible in his hands," Wilcher said. "He was already built like a grown man; he was all cut up (like a bodybuilder). I asked him, 'Can I help you sir?' He looked around to see who I was talking to. I said, 'Are you looking for a student?' He said, 'No, I go here.' He said he was a freshman. I thought he was lying." When the defensive coordinator kicked Gholston off the team for being too soft, Wilcher went to his house and dragged him back into the program: "I told him I didn't care if he wasn't tough enough, he was going to play football for me," Wilcher said. "I knew that he had desire to play. My only regret is that I didn't put him at running back. I didn't know how fast he was."

=== Michigan State University ===
In 2021, Wilcher accepted an off-field position on the staff of Michigan State Spartans football as the Director of Community and High School Relations.

== Head coaching record ==
Year	Team	Overall	Conference	Standing	Bowl/playoffs
Cass Tech Technicians (Detroit Public School League - Division I) (1997–2011)
1997	Cass Tech	7–3	4–1		Class AA Pre-Regional
1998	Cass Tech	7–2	4–1		Division I District
1999	Cass Tech	7–2	4–1		Division I District
2000	Cass Tech	9–3	3–2		Division I Regional
2001	Cass Tech	5–5	3–2		
2002	Cass Tech	5–4	3–2		
2003	Cass Tech	6–4	3–2		Division I Pre-District
2004	Cass Tech	4–5	2–3		
2005	Cass Tech	2–7	1–4		
2006	Cass Tech	7–4	3–2		Division I District
2007	Cass Tech	5–4	1–3		
2008	Cass Tech	8–3	3–1		Division I District
2009	Cass Tech	6–4	2–2		Division I District
2010	Cass Tech	12–1	4–0		Division I Semifinal
2011	Cass Tech	11–3	5–1		Won Division 1 State Championship
Cass Tech Technicians (Detroit Public School League - West) (2012–present)
2012	Cass Tech	12–2	6–0		Won Division 1 State Championship
2013	Cass Tech	12–1	–		Division I Semifinal
2014	Cass Tech	12–1	–		Division I Semifinal
2015	Cass Tech	12–2	–		Division I Runner-up
2016	Cass Tech	14–0	–		Won Division 1 State Championship
2017	Cass Tech	10–3	–		Division 1 State Semifinalist
Cass Tech:		173–65	51–27		
Total:		173–65			
National championship Conference title Conference division title or championship game berth

== Personal ==
Wilcher and his wife Crystal have a son, Kishon, and daughters Kaila and Kiersten. As of November 2013 Kishon is a redshirt sophomore cornerback for the Toledo Rockets. Kaila was the 2012 Detroit Public School League champion in the 300 meter dash.
