= Unflattening =

2015 graphic novel by Nick Sousanis

Unflattening is a graphic novel by artist and researcher Nick Sousanis that was originally the first dissertation from Columbia University to be written in a comic book format. The book was published by Harvard University Press in April 2015 and won the 2015 Lynd Ward Graphic Novel Prize, taking top honor as book of the year. The Brazilian edition of the book (Desaplanar, editora Veneta, published in 2017), won the 2018 Troféu HQ Mix in the category "best theoretical book".
