= Emeline King =

American industrial designer (born 1957)

- Born: December 16, 1957 (age 68); Detroit, Michigan, U.S.
- Education: Wayne State University, ArtCenter College of Design
- Occupations: Industrial designer, transportation designer, motivational speaker, musician, author
- Employer: Ford Motor Company (1983–2008)
- Known for: Automotive design
- Website: www.emelineking.com

Emeline King (born December 16, 1957) is an American industrial designer, known for her automotive designs. In 1983, she was hired by Ford Motor Company, and became the first Black woman designer for the automobile manufacturer. King also works as a motivational speaker, musician, and author. She authored an autobiography, "What Do You Mean A Black Girl Can't Design? Emeline King, She Did It" (2021, Claire Aldin Pub.).

== Biography ==
King was born on December 16, 1957, in Detroit, Michigan, into a Black family. Her father, Earnest O. King Sr. worked as fabrication specialist at Ford Motor Company in Detroit, and from a young age she was exposed to car design. She graduated from Cass Technical High School in Detroit.

King received a bachelor of fine arts degree in industrial design from Wayne State University; and continued her education and received a bachelor of science degree in transportation design at the ArtCenter College of Design in Pasadena, California.

King worked as a transportation designer within the design center at Ford Motor Company, from October 1983 to July 2008. She designed the 1994 Ford Mustang (fourth generation) interior (also known as SN95). King also made design contributions to other vehicle models, including the interior components in the 1989–1990 Ford Thunderbird (tenth generation); the 1993 Ford Mustang Mach III; the 1994 official pace car roll bar and graphics for the Ford Mustang; the 2000 two-seater Ford Thunderbird interior components; and the 2004 Lincoln Aviator interior door scuff panel and interior components. King also worked in car design in England, Italy, and Germany.

After leaving Ford Motor Company, King wrote her autobiography, "What Do You Mean A Black Girl Can't Design? Emeline King, She Did It" published in 2021 by Claire Aldin Publishers.

== See also ==
- List of African-American women in STEM fields
