= Charles Wysocki (artist) =

American painter

- Born: Charles M. Wysocki, Jr. November 16, 1928; Detroit, Michigan
- Died: July 29, 2002 (aged 73)
- Resting place: Mountain View Cemetery, Altadena, California
- Citizenship: United States
- Education: Cass Technical High School
- Alma mater: ArtCenter College of Design
- Occupation: painter
- Spouse: Elizabeth Wysocki
- Children: David, Millie, and Matt

Charles M. Wysocki, Jr. (November 16, 1928 – July 29, 2002) was an American painter, whose primitive artworks depict a stylized version of American life of yesteryear. While some of his works show horseless carriages, most depict the horse and buggy era. Wysocki released his paintings in popular art prints and merchandised with calendars, collector plates, tins, greeting cards, wallpaper and jigsaw puzzles.

== Biography ==
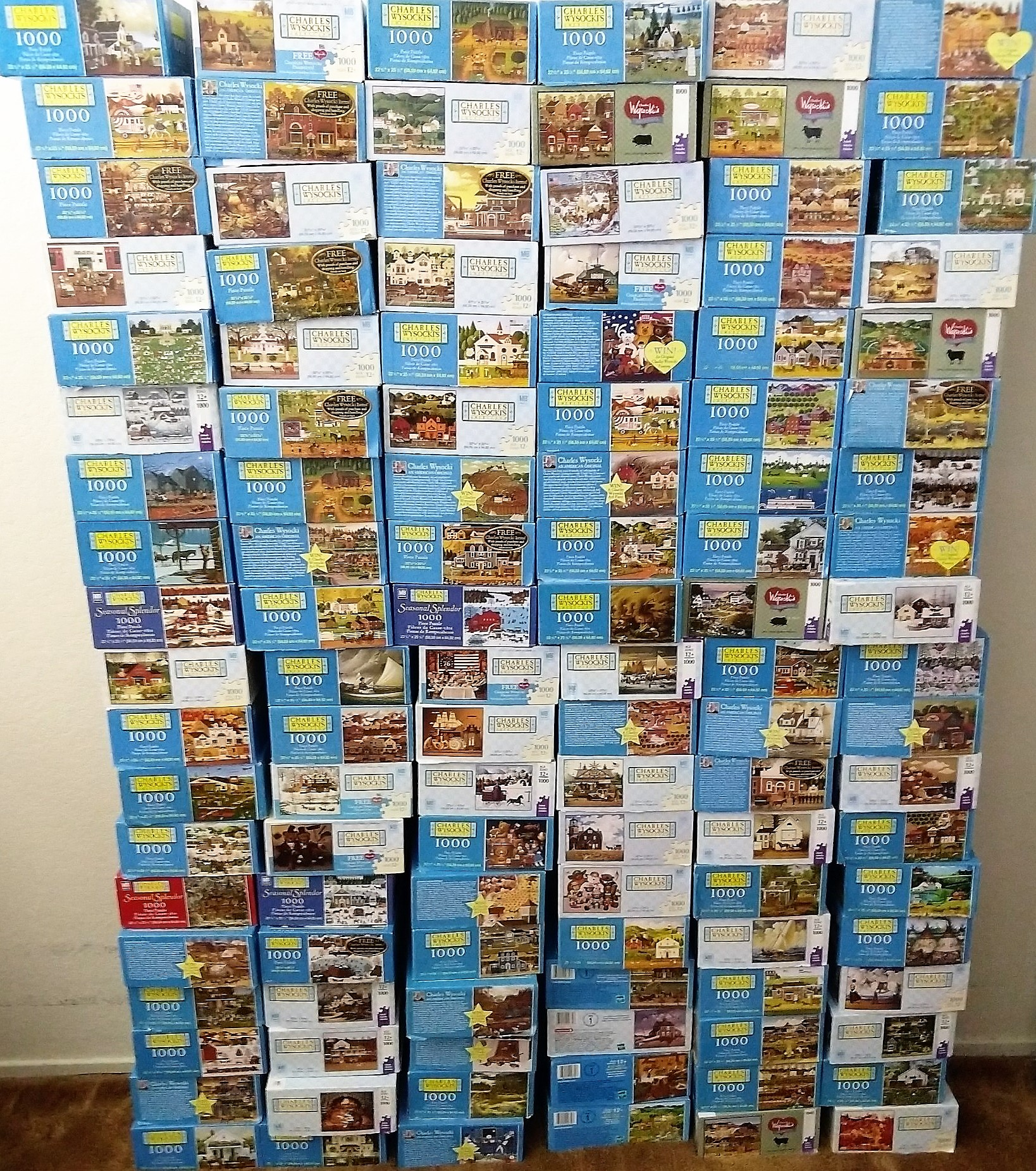
Boxes of Charles Wysocki jigsaw puzzles

Charles M. Wysocki, Jr., was born in Detroit, Michigan, the son of Charles M. Wysocki and Mary K. Wysocki. His father was born in Poland, while his mother was born in Kansas to Polish-born parents.

At Cass Technical High School in Detroit he studied art. In 1950 while working in local art studios, he was drafted into the Army and spent his two-year hitch in West Germany. After his service he went to the ArtCenter College of Design in Los Angeles under the G.I. Bill, where he studied to be a commercial illustrator. After working in that field in Detroit for four years, he returned to Los Angeles where he helped to form a freelance advertising agency.

In 1960, he met Elizabeth G. Lawrence, an art graduate of University of California, Los Angeles, whom he married on July 29 of that year in Los Angeles. Through his wife, whose family were early settlers in the San Fernando Valley, Wysocki came to appreciate a simpler, more rural life than that of the big city. Together they made many trips to New England, which served to nurture his interest in early American folk art. For a while, he continued his lucrative commercial art work while developing primitive art in his spare time. Eventually, though, he devoted all of his attention to this new interest. His focus was on Americana landscapes of old New England, with antiques, fall colors, snow scenes and picturesque barns. Also popular were a few works featuring cats, such as sleeping cats populating a bookshelf. In the 1990s Wysocki had an art gallery in Lake Arrowhead. His work was marketed and licensed by AMCAL, Inc. and for a time by the Greenwich Workshop, Ltd.

By the 1980s, his products were reaping more than $7 million in annual sales and was said to have sold more than $10 million in jigsaw puzzles over a decade. He was featured in the July 7, 1986 edition of People magazine. In an interview, Wysocki said "I like the fact that I appeal to the average guy ... I feel so fortunate."

Wysocki was a favorite artist of Ronald Reagan. As California governor, he hung one of Wysocki’s New England paintings in his office. After Reagan became president, Wysocki was extended an invitation to the 1981 White House Independence Day celebration. At that time, his painting The White House Fourth of July Picnic, became part of the presidential art collection. In 1991 the Richard Nixon Library exhibited Wysocki’s works which drew thousands of visitors.

Two books featuring Wysocki's works were published: An American Celebration (1985) and Heartland (1994). Although these met with much success, Publishers Weekly dubbed him a faux naïve artist.

Wysocki made his home in Joshua Tree, California, painting up until his death in 2002 at the age of 73, following abdominal surgery complications. He died on his forty-second wedding anniversary, surrounded by his family. Wysocki was survived by his wife, three children and two grandchildren.

Currently, Wysocki art prints continue to sell through galleries and alongside home decor through Wayfair. His original oil paintings sell between $1,000 and $60,000 when they come up at auction. In 2020 Olde Bucks County fetched $60,000, exceeding Christie's pre-auction estimate of $10,000 to $20,000.
