= Maya Stovall =

American artist

Maya Stovall Dumas is an American conceptual artist and anthropologist. Stovall Dumas is best known for her use of ballet and public space in her art practice. She is associate professor, California State Polytechnic University, Pomona and lives and works in Los Angeles.

== Life and education ==
Maya Stovall Dumas was born in Detroit, Michigan. She read her doctorate in anthropology at Wayne State University, supervised by Ph.D. committee chair Andrew D. Newman and dissertation advisors Lee D. Baker, Biba Bell, Stephen Chrisomalis, and Ariel Osterweis. She was born and grew up in Detroit, where she graduated from Cass Technical High School. She graduated from The University Of Chicago, where she studied economics at Chicago Booth, and Howard University.

== Exhibitions ==
Maya Stovall Dumas's work was included in the 2017 Whitney Biennial. Her work was included in the 2017-2018 Studio Museum in Harlem 'F' Series installment, Fictions. Her work has been shown in solo and group exhibitions at Aka Artist Run (Saskatoon, Saskatchewan, Canada), Atlanta Contemporary, Contemporary Art Museum St. Louis, Cranbrook Art Museum, Fort Mason Center for Arts & Culture, Independent NYC, Jessica Silverman Gallery (San Francisco), Library Street Collective (Detroit), Maryland Institute College of Art, Museum of Contemporary Art Toronto Canada, Newbridge Projects (New Castle Upon Tyne, U.K.), Parrasch Heijnen Gallery, Los Angeles, Pop Montreal, Pulitzer Arts Foundation, Reyes | Finn (Detroit), and the San Francisco Art Institute.

== Collections ==
Maya Stovall Dumas's work is included in the collection of the Kalamazoo Institute of Arts, Los Angeles County Museum of Art, Whitney Museum of American Art and the collection of the Cranbrook Art Museum.
