= Harold Neal (artist) =

American artist

Harold Lloyd Neal
- Born: December 19, 1924; Memphis, Tennessee
- Died: May 6, 1996 (aged 71)
- Education: Booker T. Washington High School in Memphis
- Alma mater: LeMoyne College, College for Creative Studies
- Occupations: Painter, artist
- Parents: James Neal (father); Ogie Neal (mother)

Harold Lloyd Neal (December 19, 1924 - May 6, 1996) was an American painter and part of the Black Arts Movement. Neal is especially known for his instrumental role in the history of African American art in Detroit. His work explored themes and topics such as religion, Pan Africanism, and Black Nationalism.

== Life ==
=== Early life ===
Harold Neal was born on December 19, 1924, in Memphis, Shelby County, Tennessee. He was the eldest child of eight, born to James and Ogie Neal. The Neal family was known to be amongst the more affluent families in the Black community at the time. James Neal’s tobacco and confectioner’s shop on Beale Street attributed to this affluence, as well as Ogie’s own college education. Members of the Neal family suspects illegal gambling may have contributed to the success of James Neal’s store, but no evidence has proven this.

Ogie supported Harold’s artistic interests from a young age, allowing him to explore drawing and illustrating as a hobby. Neal attended Booker T. Washington High School in Memphis, where he founded an art club.

After the death of his father in 1941, and only one year of high school, Harold left school to join the service. He later finished his education after serving in the Air Force as a Technical sergeant in Radio Air Communications from 1942-1946. While in the Air Force, Neal earned the reputation of a muralist.

Neal’s interest in the arts continued outside of school at LeMoyne Art Center, part of LeMoyne College, a historically Black university. Neal’s exposure to the arts and Black history at a young age was unique, as this was not part of the curriculum of public schools at the time. This experience largely impacted Neal’s own desire to pursue the idea of federal support for the arts.

=== Middle years ===
Neal moved to Detroit in 1947. Due to racial discrimination at the time, Neal was forced to work a low level job, despite his high school degree and veteran status. Neal worked as a handyman at Vanity Furniture, and later took a job at Hy-Grade food in 1948, joining the United Packinghouse Workers of America union. Due to the fear of Communism during the 1950s, Neal was investigated by the FBI for his ties to the labor union. Neal represented the union at a conference for the Exposition for Peace of the American People’s Congress in Chicago. This organization was deemed a Communist front by the FBI, marking Neal as a major suspect. Neal had ties to other artists that had been targets of McCarthy-era tactics, such as poet and sculptor Oliver LaGrone, who later became a mentor and important figure in Neal’s life. Despite these convictions for worker’s rights, Neal decided to shy away from Black rights organizations that were forming in the late 1950s and early 1960s. Family members attribute this to his own past aversions to being seen as a “joiner” in his childhood.

By the early 1950s, Neal had paid for his own education using veterans benefits from the GI Bill. Harold enrolled in classes for a year at the Meinzinger Foundation Art School. He left after a year, which is suspected to be due to the school’s open racism towards Black people, even going so far as saying that “Negroes…should not come to that school.”

Instead, Neal and many other Black students enrolled at the Society of Arts and Crafts (SAC, now known as the College for Creative Studies), graduating in 1953. While at SAC, Neal met numerous other talented Black artists, such as Charles McGee and Glanton Dowdell, who later became influential collaborators with Neal. Neal’s abstract style of painting was very clearly influenced by professors at SAC, such as Sarkis Sarkisian and Guy Palazzola.

In 1952, Harold was hired by Michigan Bell as a janitor, spending the next two decades working his way up to higher ranking positions at the company. By 1972, Neal had a highly sought after position in community relations, but faced much racial discrimination from customers. In 1977, he had a stroke, causing him to pull back completely from Michigan Bell. Instead, Neal turned solely to his artistic work.

=== Later life ===
By 1965, Harold Neal became an integral part of BAM, the Black Arts Movement. Following the assassination of Malcom X, Black artists began to place specific emphasis on creating work for Black people about the Black experience. Neal’s participation in the Detroit Black Artists Conference in 1966 exposed him to this sentiment. Neal participated in many group exhibitions in the 1960s and 70s, once being on the record for saying that his work was pervaded with his anger for the treatment of Black people at the time.

In 1969, a close friend and colleague of Neal’s, Charles McGee, was asked to curate a show for the Detroit Artists Market. This exhibition, called Seven Black Artists, showcased the work of seven Black artists, including Harold Neal. Other artists included James Dudley Strickland, Lester Johnson, James King Jr., Robert Murray, James Lee, Robert J. Stull, and McGee, many of whom attended the Society of Arts and Crafts with Neal. The success of this exhibition led to the opening of Gallery 7, a space for exhibition of new Black artists. Neal was heavily involved with this space at the time.

In the 1980s, following the election of Ronald Reagan, Neal and many other Detroit artists turned from protest towards celebration of African American heritage and culture. At this point in Neal’s career, he shifted from figural work towards a more abstract style of painting and assemblage. Neal’s work still dealt heavily with themes of the Black experience.

Harold Neal died May 6, 1996.

== Work ==
=== Early work ===
Sketchbooks from Neal’s time studying at SAC show an abundance of life drawing, including human figures and skeletons, as well as work exploring perspective, shapes, and color. These pages also illuminate an interest in jazz, theater, current events, and Black history.

=== Later work ===
Neal’s involvement in the Black Arts Movement led to a plethora of works depicting the horrors and realities of life as a Black American in the mid 20th century. Neal’s “Riot Series” was a collection of paintings that depict real and imagined scenes from Black American history. An untitled painting of Tonya Blanding illustrates when the four year old was mistakenly shot and killed in her apartment by National Guard Troops in 1968. Paintings such as these are manifestations of Neal’s pain and anger. The “Riot Series” also touched on subjects like mass-incarceration of Black people, seen in his work “Attica,” from 1972.

Two years before Neal’s death, he began his Zodiac Series — a series of paintings that focused on jazz and music, often referencing Detroit-based musicians.

=== Style ===
Harold Neal is recognized for his atmospheric quality of painting, achieved by layering paint with fluidity and ease. Neal mastered an ability to use a generally muted palette with splashes of very bright color, giving depth and dimension to his pieces. “Reluctant Flowering” is a painting that depicts the story of a 13-year-old prostitute that Neal met on the street. Neal’s portrait is somber, yet uses pops of color to illustrate her own vitality, even in a state of distress.

Neal also openly rejected the “non objective” style of art that was popular amongst white artists in the 1960s. Instead, Neal’s objective paintings were seen as a reclaiming of the “struggle” of Black Americans at the time.

=== Themes ===
==== Pan Africanism ====
Pan Africanism is heavily ingrained into much of Harold Neal’s work. A deep understanding and connection to current events of African nations, like the Congo, fueled an anger and sadness in Neal that is ever present in his work. Neal’s desire to unite African peoples across the globe begins to show in his work.

==== Black Nationalism ====
Black Nationalism also became a subject in Neal’s life, and thus artwork. Neal’s own participation in Detroit’s political circle of Black nationalists cemented him as an active member of this movement. The belief that African people should distance themselves from white society is seen in works like Neal’s “The Merchants,” which depicts a North African bazaar market scene. Neal’s later work continues to demonstrate an opposition to white culture, very noticeably depicted in “Rag Doll,” a 1967-69 painting of a man ripping a white doll apart. This is thought to be direct commentary on the need to deconstruct white culture in order to create a more unique Black culture.

==== Symbolism ====
Symbols and objects tied directly to Black history can be found throughout Neal’s early sketches. Objects such as a Ku Klux Klan hood, and text reading “Cicero, Martinsville, Trenton” are all indications of a deep understanding of contemporary racial incidents in America.

Religious symbolism and figures can be found in many of Neal’s paintings. Chris Neal, Harold’s son, has attributed this largely to his father’s own reckoning with religious beliefs and tensions in his household growing up. Harold’s mother, Ogie, was openly very religious, attending the Church of God in Christ (related to the Holiness Pentecostal tradition).

==== Black Christian Nationalism ====
Black Christian Nationalism manifested in much of Neal’s work, such as his 1966 painting “Pied Piper.” Symbols like the Star of David, a Christian cross, and the crescent moon and star of Islam, are painted on the body of what seems to be a white devil figure. It is believed that Neal’s intent was to imply these organized religions are directly tied to evil. It is also believed that these works of Neal’s are related to ideas of Black Christian Nationalism, as they center white Christianity as a marker of evil, compared to Black Christianity. While Neal does not have any direct commentary on record regarding Black Christian Nationalism, his work and the work of his artistic peers at the time all contain overt messaging that echoes the sentiment.

==== Voodoo ====
Common in Neal’s work was a reference to Voodoo, as Neal was interested in exploring his own cultural roots. During a trip to Haiti in the 1970s, Neal experienced contact with Voodoo culture and a rich history of the culture of African slaves. “Haitian Voodoo Priestess,” a charcoal drawing from 1982, depicts this interest in voodoo culture.

==== Respite ====
“Respite” became a common theme in Neal’s work, as he openly sought out an escape from the horrors of the treatment of Black people. Rather, Neal turned to painting the beauty of African American women and children for comfort. Neal’s paintings of Black women in the nude often took the form of biblical characters, such as “Bethsheba,” a practice common in the history of art. Neal also has a rich breadth of work that touches on themes of jazz and music.

==== Architecture ====
Structure and architecture are often at the core of much of Neal’s work. Students of Neal recall that the “substructure” of architectural wonders captured the eye of Neal. “Man Span” is an example of this interest.

== Notable exhibitions ==
Neal’s longest run of showcasing work was at a nonprofit artist’s organization called the Detroit Artists Market (DAM), one of the earlier art spaces open to African American artists in Detroit. Many white patrons bought art from Neal at these exhibitions, causing some outrage amongst fellow Black artists.

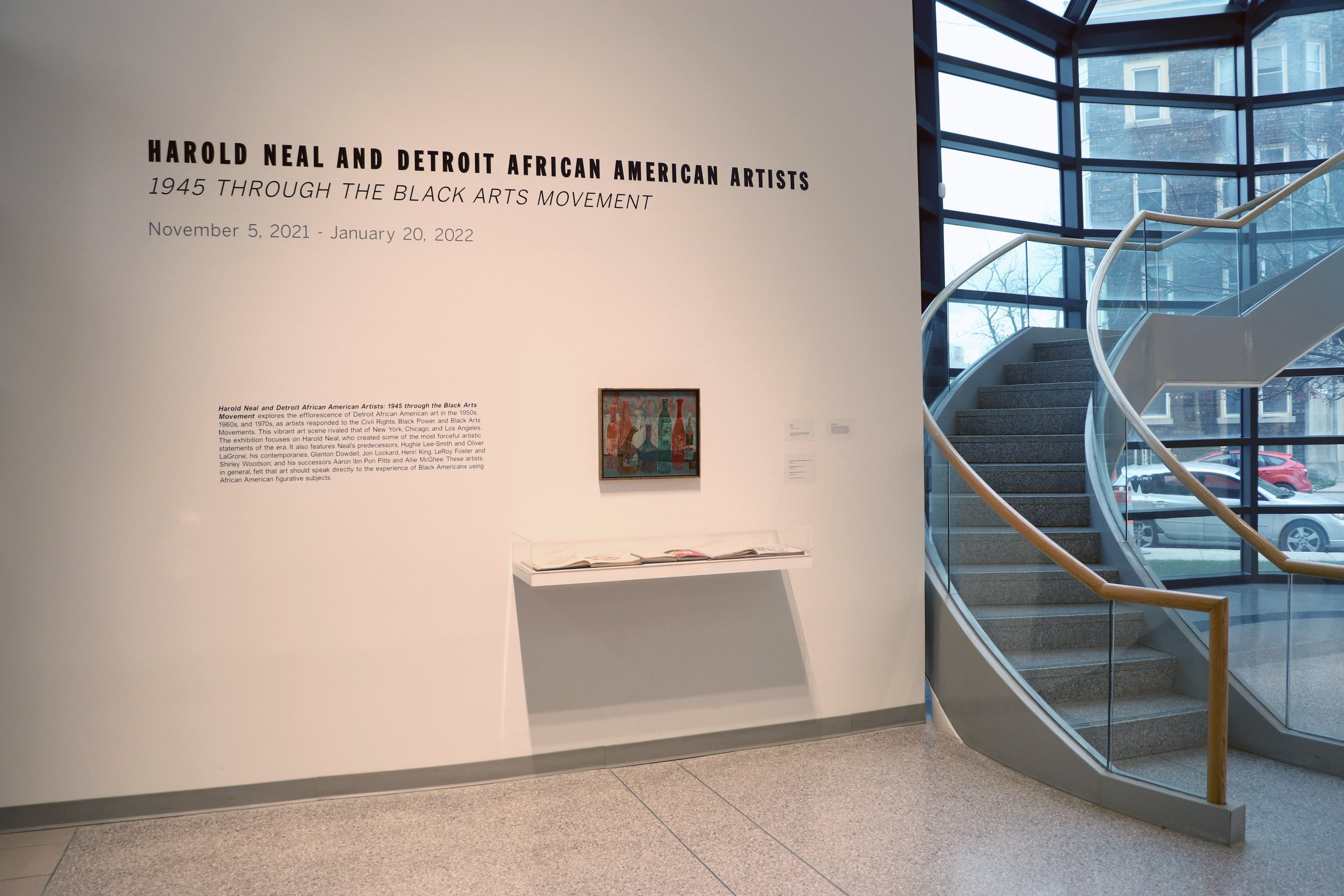
Still from Harold Neal's exhibition at Wayne State.

In the fall of 2021, “Harold Neal and Detroit African American Artists: 1945 through the Black Arts Movement” was shown at Eastern Michigan University Art Gallery. This show also exhibited at the Wayne State Gallery in Detroit.

In July 2024, the Museum of Contemporary Art Detroit (MOCAD) exhibited “Kinship: The legacy of the 7 with Charles McGee.” This exhibition was dedicated to the history and work of Gallery 7, “one of the first art venues in Detroit dedicated to the work of Black artists, founded and run by Charles McGee from 1969 to 1979.” Neal’s work was included in this gallery, and he is noted to be one of the founders of this space.

== Collections and representation ==
Harold Neal’s work is included in the permanent collection of the Saint Louis Art Museum, the Marshall M. Fredericks Sculpture Museum, and has had a number of traveling exhibitions in many notable institutions.

A large amount of Neal’s work is represented by Mongerson Gallery in Chicago.
