= David H. Sanford =

American philosopher (1937–2022)

David H. Sanford (December 13, 1937 – September 1, 2022) was an American professor of philosophy at Duke University. He specialized in perception and metaphysics.

Sanford studied at Cass Technical High School, Oberlin College and at Wayne State University. He received his Ph.D. from Cornell University in 1966, taught at Dartmouth College from 1963 to 1970, and joined the Duke Faculty in 1970. He has been a visiting professor at the University of Michigan and the University of Oregon.

Much of Sanford's work is about conditionals. His book If P, Then Q: Conditionals and the Foundations of Reasoning was published in 1989, second edition 2003,

Sanford's influence in analytic philosophy extends well beyond his published work in metaphysics. From 2006 to 2007, he was president of the Society for Philosophy and Psychology.

Sandford died on September 1, 2022, at the age of 84.

== See also ==
- American philosophy
- List of American philosophers
