= Joe Barksdale =

American football player (born 1989)

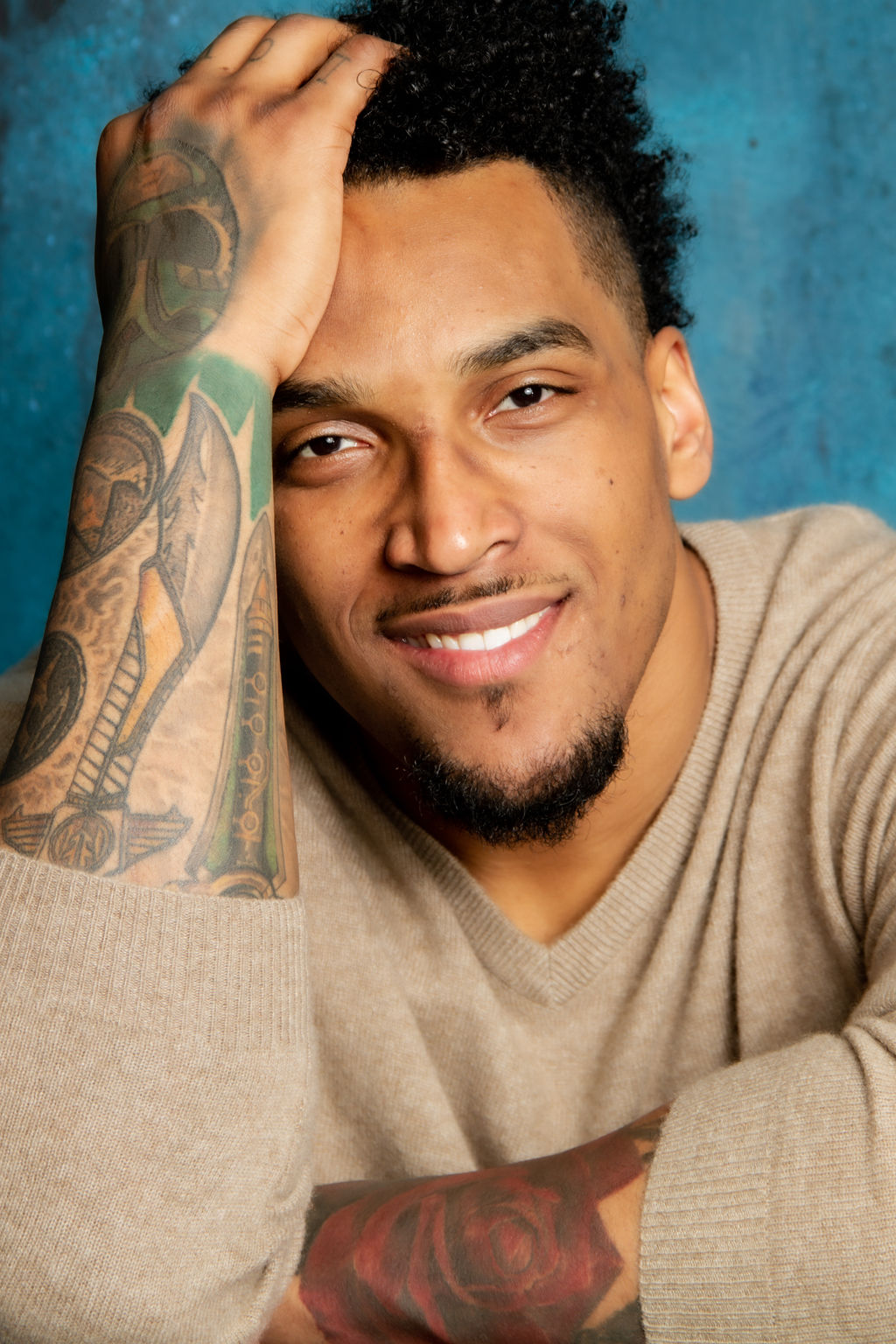
- Barksdale in 2020

No. 72, 68, 60
- Position: Offensive tackle

Personal information
- Born: January 4, 1989 (age 37); Detroit, Michigan, U.S.
- Listed height: 6 ft 5 in (1.96 m)
- Listed weight: 326 lb (148 kg)

Career information
- High school: Cass Technical (Detroit)
- College: LSU (2007–2010)
- NFL draft: 2011: 3rd round, 92nd overall pick

Career history
- Oakland Raiders (2011–2012); St. Louis Rams (2012–2014); San Diego / Los Angeles Chargers (2015–2018); Arizona Cardinals (2018)

Awards and highlights
- BCS national champion (2008); Second-team All-SEC (2010)

Career NFL statistics
- Games played: 106
- Games started: 78
- Stats at Pro Football Reference

Joseph Brennen Barksdale (born January 4, 1989) is an American singer-songwriter, electric guitar player, and former professional football player who was an offensive tackle in the National Football League (NFL). Born in Detroit, Michigan, he attended Louisiana State University on a full-ride football scholarship. He was selected by the Oakland Raiders in the third round of the 2011 NFL draft. He played college football for the LSU Tigers. He also played for the St. Louis Rams, San Diego / Los Angeles Chargers, and Arizona Cardinals.

== Music career ==
Barksdale began playing guitar in 2013, at the suggestion of his then head coach, Jeff Fisher. In January 2018, he released his first album Butterflies, Rainbows, & Moonbeams. Blues Rock Review called it “an upbeat world, where funk and blues mingle, and where songs pop into existence, not because they fit within a certain genre, but because they’ll make the listener (and one suspects, the performer) happy. It’s also a world where an NFL tackle manages to create one of the more delightful, sincere records of 2018.”

In April 2019, Barksdale released an EP titled Electric Soul, produced by Narada Michael Walden.

In June 2019, Barksdale retired from the NFL to pursue music full time.

In February 2020 he released single "Black Majik", which was described by Ryan Baltz of American Songwriter as a "dark and funky helping of shot-in-the-veins blues".

== High school career ==
Barksdale attended Cass Technical High School in Detroit, Michigan, where he was a two-way lineman for coach Thomas Wilcher. He recorded 73 tackles (17 for losses), 14 hurries, seven quarterback sacks, one interception and three forced fumbles as a senior, and received High School All-American honors by Parade and USA Today. He also participated in the U.S. Army All-American Bowl as a member of the East team.

Considered a four-star recruit by Rivals.com, Barksdale was listed as the No. 6 defensive tackle prospect in the nation. He chose LSU over Michigan State, Notre Dame and Ohio State, becoming the first state of Michigan signee in LSU history.

== College career ==
Barksdale graduated early from high school and enrolled at LSU in January 2007. Although recruited as a defensive tackle, he was switched to the offensive side of the ball during fall camp. As a true freshman in 2007 he played 14 games as a backup to Carnell Stewart at right tackle.

Following Stewart's graduation, Barksdale took over as right tackle and started all 13 games for the Tigers. He helped anchor an offensive line that paved the way for an LSU rushing attack that ranked No. 4 in the SEC with 166.7 yards per game. Barksdale and left tackle Ciron Black were regarded as "the best duo of tackles in SEC."

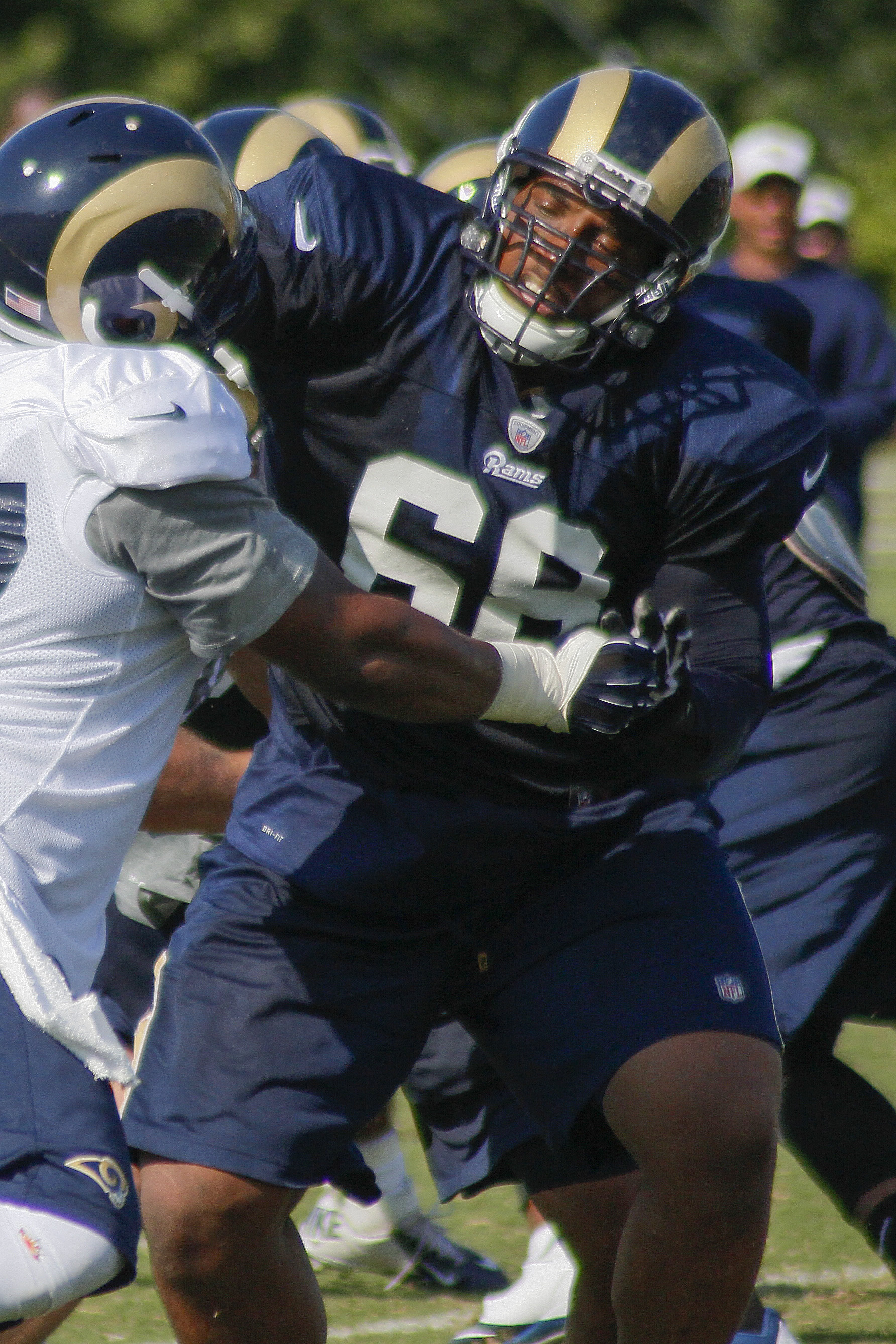
Barksdale during 2013 Rams Training Camp.

== American football career ==
Pre-draft measurables
Height	Weight	Arm length	Hand span	Wingspan	40-yard dash	10-yard split	20-yard split	20-yard shuttle	Three-cone drill	Vertical jump	Broad jump	Bench press
6 ft 4 3/4 in (1.95 m)	325 lb (147 kg)	36 in (0.91 m)	10 in (0.25 m)	7 ft 0 1/8 in (2.14 m)	5.38 s	1.85 s	3.11 s	4.64 s	7.95 s	29.5 in (0.75 m)	8 ft 7 in (2.62 m)	29 reps
All values from NFL Combine/Pro Day

=== Oakland Raiders ===
Barksdale was selected in the third round with the 92nd overall pick in the 2011 NFL draft by the Oakland Raiders. He was released on September 26, 2012.

=== St. Louis Rams ===
The St. Louis Rams signed Barksdale on September 27, 2012. On October 21, 2012, Barksdale made his first NFL start at left tackle against the Green Bay Packers.

=== San Diego / Los Angeles Chargers ===
Barksdale signed a one-year contract with the San Diego Chargers on May 19, 2015. The deal worth the base minimum, with a $350,000 signing bonus, and up to $1,000,000 in incentives. In his first season as a Charger, he started all 16 games.

On March 7, 2016, Barksdale agreed to a four-year $22,000,000 contract extension and a signing bonus worth up to $4,000,000 with the Chargers. He appeared in and started 15 games in the 2016 season.

In 2017, Barksdale started 11 games at right tackle, missing five games due to a foot injury.

Barksdale entered the 2018 season slated as the starting right tackle, however suffered a knee injury in Week 1 and missed the next five games. He returned in Week 7, but he was replaced in the starting lineup by Sam Tevi. He played in the next five games but remained out of the starting lineup. He was inactive in Week 13 before ultimately being released on December 3, 2018.

=== Arizona Cardinals ===
On December 5, 2018, Barksdale was signed by the Arizona Cardinals after D. J. Humphries was placed on injured reserve.

== Personal life ==
Joseph married Brionna in March 2015. Barksdale is also a member of Omega Psi Phi fraternity. In 2018, Barksdale opened up regarding his struggles with depression. In 2022, he revealed an autism diagnosis.
