= William Campbell (gridiron football) =

American gridiron football player (born 1991)

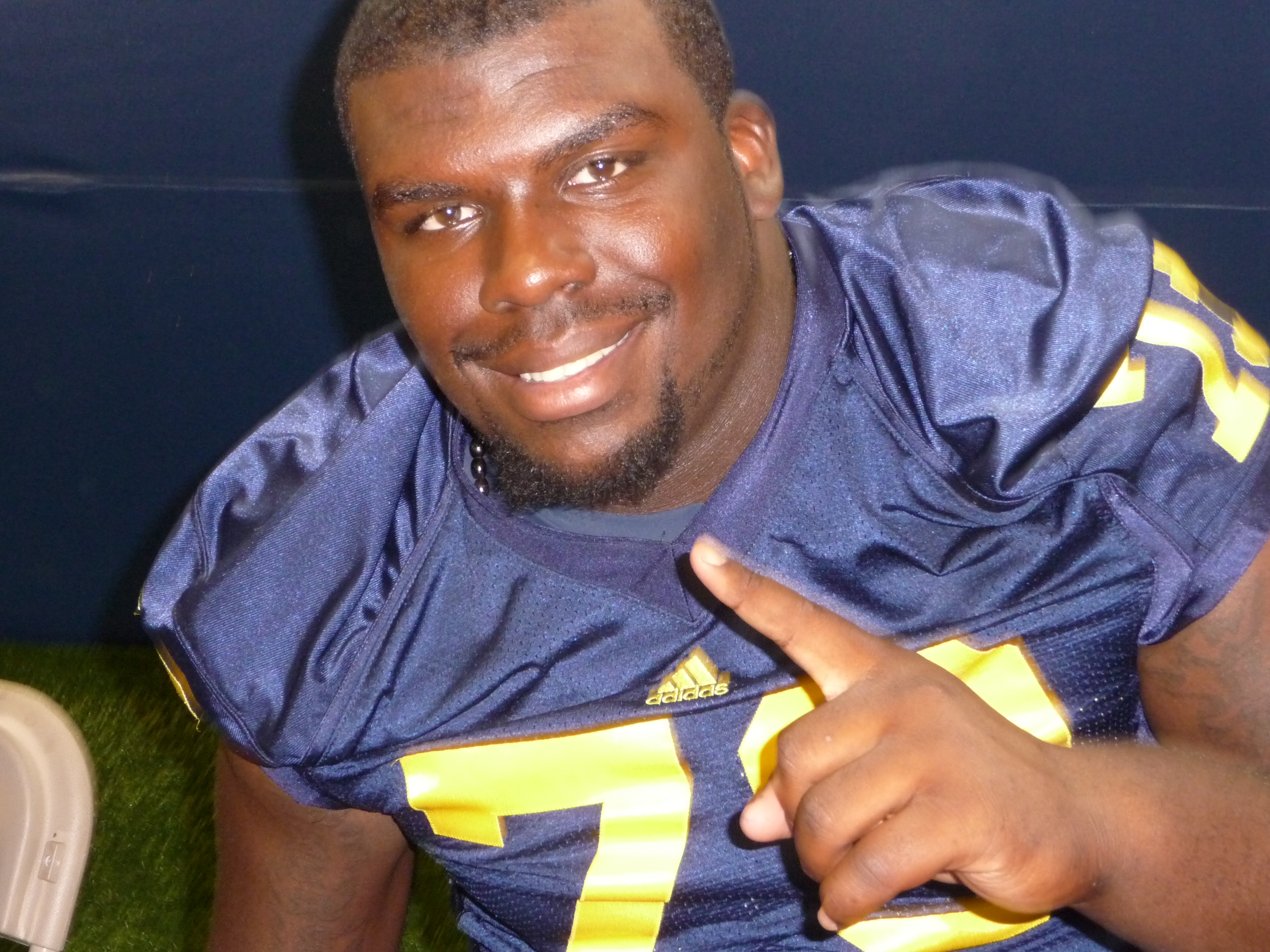
- Campbell with Michigan in 2009

No. 65, 62, 64, 69
- Position: Offensive tackle

Personal information
- Born: July 6, 1991 (age 35); Detroit, Michigan, U.S.
- Listed height: 6 ft 5 in (1.96 m)
- Listed weight: 308 lb (140 kg)

Career information
- High school: Cass Technical (Detroit)
- College: Michigan
- NFL draft: 2013: 6th round, 178th overall pick

Career history
- New York Jets (2013); Buffalo Bills (2014–2015)*; Green Bay Packers (2015–2016)*; Tennessee Titans (2016)*; Toronto Argonauts (2017–2019); Tampa Bay Vipers (2020)*; Seattle Dragons (2020)
- * Offseason or practice squad member only

Awards and highlights
- Grey Cup champion (2017)
- Stats at Pro Football Reference
- Stats at CFL.ca

William Campbell (born July 6, 1991) is an American former professional football offensive tackle. He played college football at Michigan. Campbell was selected by the New York Jets in the sixth round of the 2013 NFL draft. He was also a member of the Buffalo Bills, Green Bay Packers, Tennessee Titans, Toronto Argonauts, Tampa Bay Vipers, and Seattle Dragons.

== Early life ==
He played high school football under head coach Thomas Wilcher at Cass Technical High School in Detroit. While in high school, the 6 foot, 5 inch defensive tackle was also the team's punter and kicker and ran the 40-yard dash in 4.9 seconds. He played in the U.S. Army All-American Bowl, was selected as a first-team All-American by Parade magazine, EA Sports, and SuperPrep magazine. He was ranked as the best high school player in Michigan, the best defensive player in the Midwest, and one of the top high school players in the United States. Campbell had numerous scholarships offers and eventually narrowed his choice to Miami, LSU, and Michigan.

College recruiting
| Name | Hometown | School | Height | Weight | 40^{‡} | Commit date |
|---|---|---|---|---|---|---|
| William Campbell; Defensive tackle | Detroit, Michigan | Cass Tech High School | 6 ft 5 in (1.96 m) | 317 lb (144 kg) | 5.0 (According to Scout.com) | Jan 3, 2008 |
| William Campbell; Defensive tackle | Recruit ratings: Scout: Rivals: | | | | | |
Overall recruit ranking: Scout: 6 (DT) Rivals: 26 National, 5 (DT), 1 (Mich)
‡ Refers to 40-yard dash; Note: In many cases, Scout, Rivals, 247Sports, On3, and ESPN may conflict in their listings of height, weight and 40 time.; In these cases, the average was taken. ESPN grades are on a 100-point scale.; Sources: "Michigan Football Commitments". Rivals.; "2009 Michigan Football Recruiting Commits". Scout.; "Scout.com Team Recruiting Rankings". Scout.; "2009 Team Ranking". Rivals.com.

== College career ==
He had committed to play for Michigan while Lloyd Carr was head coach, but reopened his recruiting in September 2008 after Rich Rodriguez took over as the head coach. In January 2009, on the sidelines of the Army All-American Bowl, Campbell committed to Michigan.

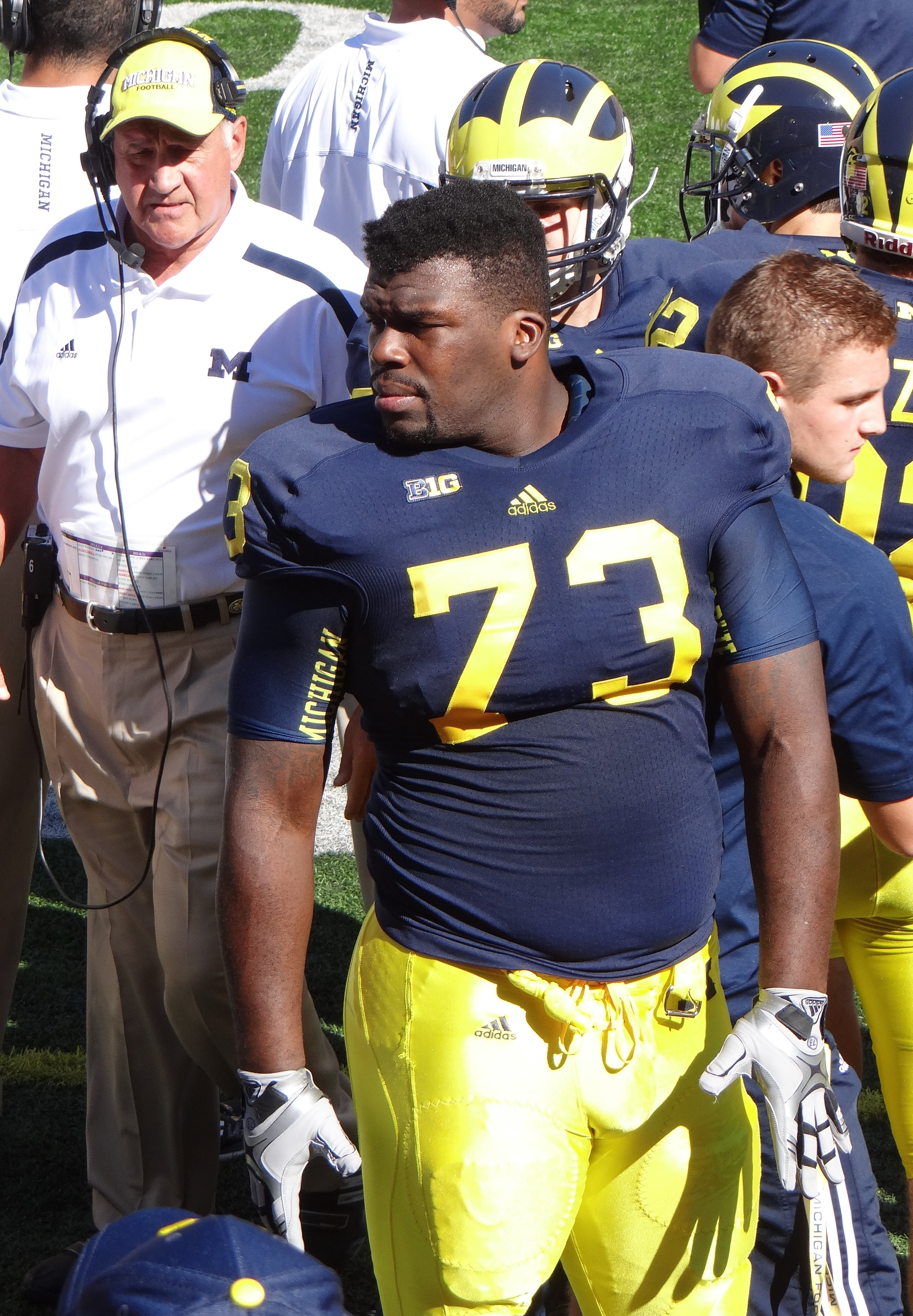
Campbell (73) with the Michigan Wolverines in 2012.

=== 2009 season ===
Campbell enrolled early at Michigan in January 2009 and participated in the Michigan football team's spring practice. During the 2009 season, Campbell appeared as a true freshman in all 12 games on special teams and played in nine games as a defensive tackle.

=== 2010 season ===
Midway through the 2010 season, head coach Rich Rodriguez assigned Campbell to the offensive line. He also appeared as a fullback in goal line situations. He appeared in all 13 games for Michigan and received his second varsity letter.

=== 2011 season ===
When new head coach Brady Hoke took over in January 2011, Campbell met with Hoke and asked to return to the defense. In March 2011, Hoke announced that Campbell was returning to the defense. Campbell appeared in all 13 games for the 2011 Michigan team. He recovered a fumble in Michigan's come-from-behind victory over Notre Dame in the first night game ever played at Michigan Stadium. After a disappointing showing in his first two seasons, Campbell won praise in the press for his improved play in 2011.

=== 2012 season ===
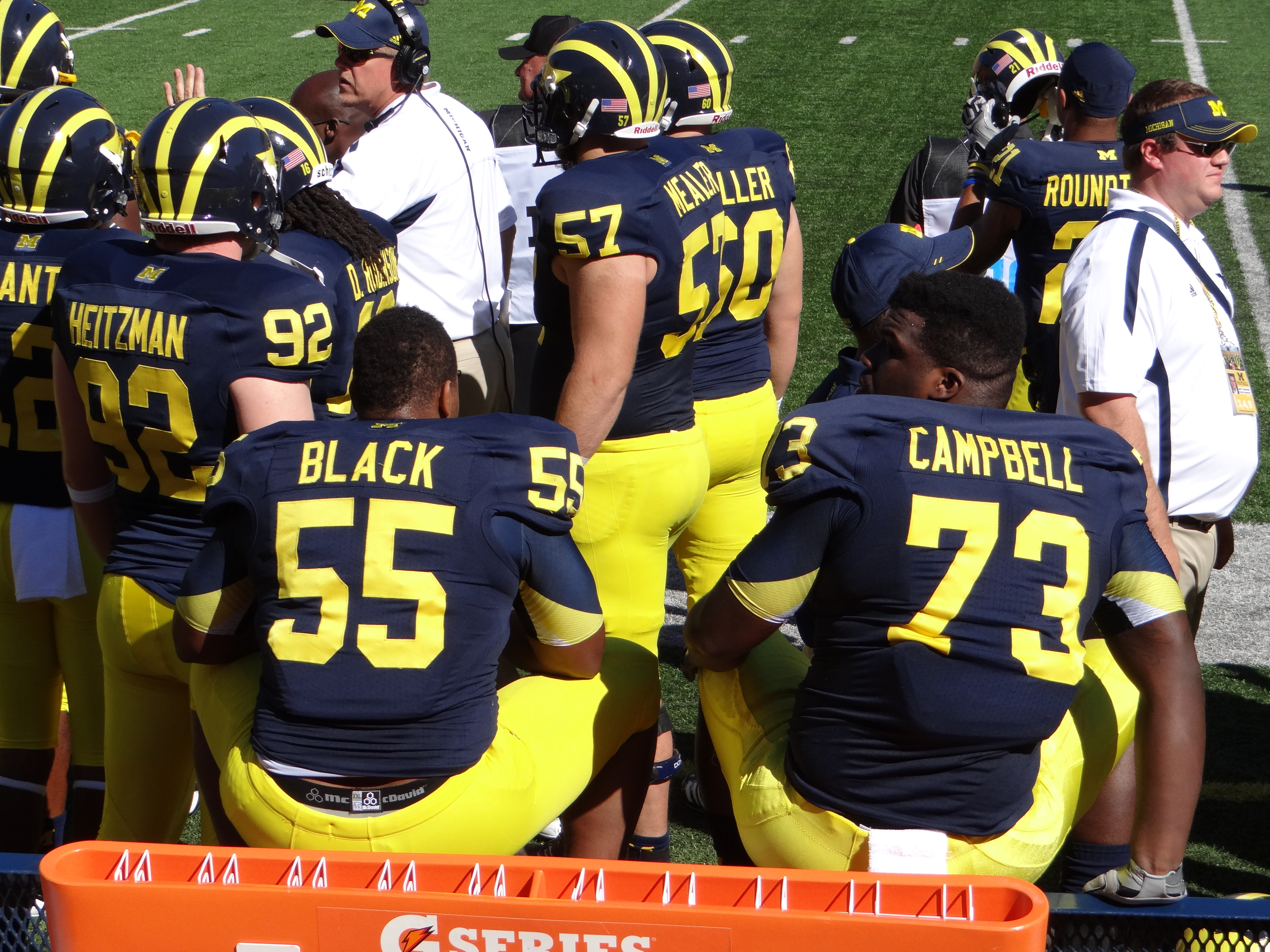
Jibreel Black and Will Cambell on Michigan bench

In late May 2012, Campbell was charged with felony malicious-destruction-of-property arising out of an incident on April 7 in which the 322-pound athlete "slid across the hood" of a Lincoln Town Car, causing damage to the hood. He reached a plea deal in June 2012 in which the felony charge was waived in exchange for a guilty plea to a misdemeanor charge and an agreement to pay $2,100 in restitution to the vehicle's owner.

In August 2012, Campbell showed up at training camp having lost 46 pounds. A writer for an Ann Arbor newspaper reported:

Overweight and out of shape for most of his career, Campbell generally spent the first week of Michigan football practice catching his breath and figuring out how he'd make it through the first month of the season. Not this time, though. 'I'm not huffing and puffing anymore,' the senior defensive tackle said after practice Monday. 'I'm not dying right now.'

Teammate Taylor Lewan added, "His conditioning shows it. You should seem [sic] him run – it's like a gazelle. Unreal." Team captain Denard Robinson joked: "Will shows off his stomach more than I do. You can tell that he lost that weight."

Campbell was a starter at defensive tackle for the 2012 Michigan Wolverines football team. He appeared in all of Michigan's first nine games. He totaled a career-high five tackles and had an unassisted sack in the season opener against Alabama. He has appeared in 47 consecutive games for Michigan. He was a 2012 All-Big Ten honorable mention selection by the media for the 2012 Wolverines.

== Professional career ==
Pre-draft measurables
| Height | Weight | Arm length | Hand span | Wingspan | 40-yard dash | 10-yard split | 20-yard split | 20-yard shuttle | Three-cone drill | Vertical jump | Broad jump | Bench press |
|---|---|---|---|---|---|---|---|---|---|---|---|---|
| 6 ft 4 5/8 in (1.95 m) | 311 lb (141 kg) | 33 1/2 in (0.85 m) | 10 1/2 in (0.27 m) | 6 ft 8 3/4 in (2.05 m) | 5.15 s | 1.87 s | 2.97 s | 4.70 s | 7.30 s | 27 in (0.69 m) | 8 ft 10 in (2.69 m) | 35 reps |
All values are from Pro Day

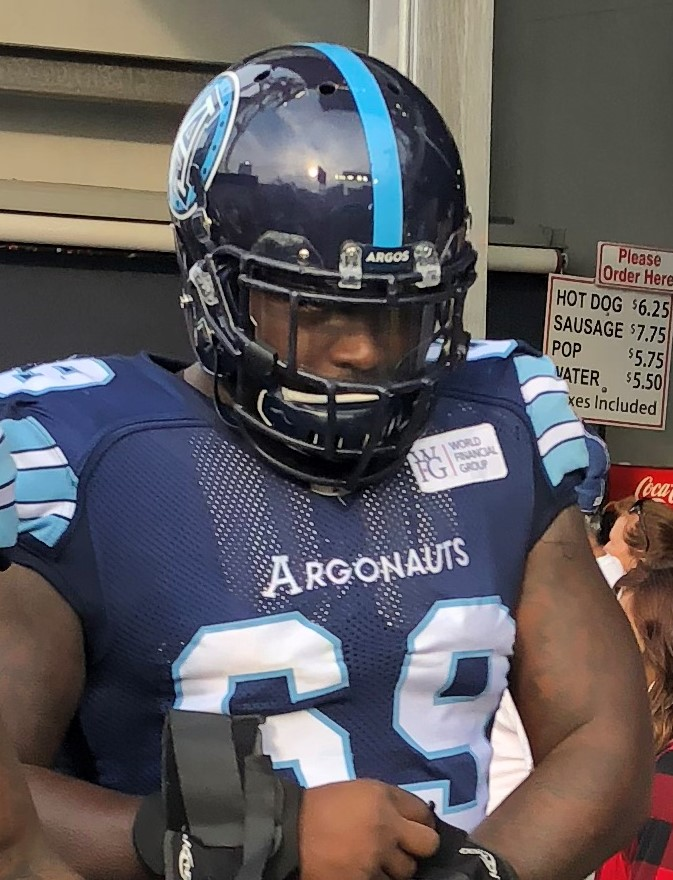
Campbell before a Toronto Argonauts game in 2018

Campbell was selected by the New York Jets in the sixth round of the 2013 NFL draft on April 27, 2013. He was released on August 30, 2014.

Campbell was signed to the Buffalo Bills' practice squad on October 7, 2014. On September 4, 2015, he was released by the Bills.

Campbell was signed to the Green Bay Packers' practice squad on January 5, 2016. On January 18, 2016, he was re-signed by the Packers after the season ended. Campbell was released on May 9, 2016.

Campbell was signed by the Tennessee Titans. On August 28, 2016, Campbell was waived by the Titans.

On June 3, 2017, Campbell signed with the Toronto Argonauts of the Canadian Football League.

In October 2019, Campbell was selected by the Tampa Bay Vipers in the 2020 XFL draft.

Campbell was traded to the Seattle Dragons along with wide receiver Alonzo Moore in exchange for defensive tackle Shane Bowman on January 19, 2020. Campbell was waived on March 11, 2020.
