= Raynetta Mañees =

American novelist

- Born: Detroit, Michigan, U.S.
- Died: April 5, 2023
- Education: Cass Technical High School; Wayne State University
- Occupation: Novelist
- Writing career
- Period: 1996–2015
- Notable works: All for Love, My Alzheimer's Diary: A Memoir of Alzheimer's Diagnosis

Raynetta Mañees (died April 5, 2023) was an African American romance novelist and entertainer.

== Personal life ==
Raynetta Mañees was born and raised in Detroit. After graduating from Cass Technical High School, she attended Wayne State University, obtaining a degree in mass communication.

She worked as an executive administrator in the U.S. federal government for 28 years before retiring. Additionally, she owned an online antique and collectible shop called "Raynetta's Romantiques".

Mañees died on April 5, 2023, and was buried in Southfield, Michigan.

== Writing career ==
Mañees published several short stories and newspaper articles before publishing her debut novel, All for Love, in 1996. She published several novels afterward, all of which were also released as ebooks.

Her second novel, Wishing on a Star, was also a bestseller and earned positive reviews from critics.

Mañees's third novel, Follow Your Heart, received a 4½-star Gold Medal Top Pick Classic rating from Romantic Times and earned the "Award of Excellence" from RomanceInColor.com.

In May 1999, Romantic Times gave A Mother's Touch a four-star rating. This work is an anthology featuring Mañees's novella All the Way Home. Additionally, in 1999, Mañees introduced her fourth full-length novel, Fantasy.

Her fifth novel, Heart of the Matter, reached the top ten of Amazon's list of best-selling multicultural romances.

== Other artistic work ==
When Mañees was five, she started her career as a vocalist. She performed as a solo artist in numerous venues in Detroit, Chicago, Lansing, and the Caribbean. Her previous performances led her to perform in musicals, which in turn led to numerous non-musical acting roles.

From 1994 to 1996, Mañees was a member of the Board of Directors of the Riverwalk Theater of Lansing, Michigan, and appeared at the Riverwalk in several productions, including West Side Story and the African-American drama Sty of the Blind Pig, in which she played the leading lady. She also took on the role of Mrs. Murphy in the Pulitzer Prize-winning play JB at the Spotlight Theater in Grand Ledge, Michigan.

Following her acting career, Mañees worked in commercial radio, serving as an on-air personality on AM 1180, WXLA, in Lansing for two years. She also performed in radio and television commercials.

== Works ==
=== Novels ===
- —— (1996). All for Love. ISBN 078600309X.
- —— (1997). Wishing on a Star. ISBN 0786004231.
- —— (1998). Follow Your Heart. ISBN 0786005602.
- —— (1999). Fantasy. ISBN 1583140301.
- —— (2002). Heart of the Matter. ISBN 1583142622.

=== Anthologies ===
- —— (1999). A Mother's Touch. ISBN 1583140158. Includes novella All the Way Home.
