= Sam Tevi =

American football player (born 1994)

No. 69
- Position: Offensive tackle

Personal information
- Born: November 15, 1994 (age 31); Euless, Texas, U.S.
- Listed height: 6 ft 5 in (1.96 m)
- Listed weight: 315 lb (143 kg)

Career information
- High school: Trinity (Euless)
- College: Utah (2013–2016)
- NFL draft: 2017: 6th round, 190th overall pick

Career history
- Los Angeles Chargers (2017–2020); Indianapolis Colts (2021)

Career NFL statistics
- Games played: 58
- Games started: 44
- Stats at Pro Football Reference

Samiuela Tevi (born November 15, 1994) is an American former professional football player who was an offensive tackle in the National Football League (NFL). He played college football for the Utah Utes, and was selected by the Los Angeles Chargers in the sixth round of the 2017 NFL draft.

== College career ==
Tevi played college football at Utah. There, he played in 48 games for the Utes football team.

== Professional career ==
Pre-draft measurables
Height	Weight	Arm length	Hand span	40-yard dash	20-yard shuttle	Three-cone drill	Vertical jump	Broad jump	Bench press
6 ft 5 3/8 in (1.97 m)	311 lb (141 kg)	34 in (0.86 m)	10 1/8 in (0.26 m)	5.27 s	4.60 s	7.84 s	26 in (0.66 m)	8 ft 11 in (2.72 m)	15 reps
All values from 2017 NFL Combine.

=== Los Angeles Chargers ===
Tevi was selected by the Los Angeles Chargers in the sixth round, 190th overall, in the 2017 NFL draft. He played in 14 games as rookie, starting one at left tackle in place of the injured Russell Okung.

Tevi entered 2018 as a backup tackle to starters Russell Okung and Joe Barksdale. He made his first start of the season in Week 2 at right tackle in place of an injured Barksdale. He remained the starter the rest of the season after ultimately replacing Barksdale when he returned from injury and was subsequently released.

=== Indianapolis Colts ===
On March 24, 2021, Tevi signed a one-year deal with the Indianapolis Colts. He suffered a torn ACL in the preseason and was placed on injured reserve on August 30.
