= Contemporary Art Institute of Detroit =

Community arts charity in Michigan, U.S.

The Contemporary Art Institute of Detroit (CAID) is a community-based nonprofit organization in Detroit, Michigan. It fosters connections between contemporary artists and the broader public through exhibitions, performances, critical discussions, and educational programs. CAID fosters and promotes the link between contemporary arts and contemporary society through exhibitions, performances, critical and public discourse and the funding of contemporary arts and art related activities.

== History ==
CAID was founded in 1978 by a group of Detroit area artists, including Charles McGee and Jean Heilbrunn . In the years since its inception, CAID has existed in several different forms, and has generated many events that have directly supported the arts in Detroit.

In 1980, CAID sponsored Exhibition Sites 1, 2, and 3. This show included performance, conceptual and video art at Hart Plaza during the Republican Convention. In 1984, CAID crossed the border to work with Artcite in Windsor. In both 1984 and 1985, CAID sponsored A Road Show, an exhibition that toured a number of Michigan cities, as well as Chicago. A four-part lecture series was held at the Detroit Institute of Art in 1989, and again in 1991. In that same year area artists were invited to create art for the Art Time Capsule, buried in Harmonie Park, as well as a plethora of other visual, musical and performance art events throughout the past 26 years.

After little activity during the mid to late 1990s, CAID re-emerged on the Detroit art community in the fall of 2002 with the four-part series LINK. LINK included an exhibition of Detroit-based artists at the Detroit Contemporary gallery, a symposium on Detroit music at Wayne State University, an electronic-music party called Frequency at the Detroit Contemporary, and Motor City Breakdown, a live-music show at the Magic Stick .

In the winter of 2004, CAID presented unCAGEd: the exploration of non-intention, a mixed-medium event based on the theories of John Cage, presented in collaboration with Ann Arbor's University Musical Society in celebration of a performance by New York's Merce Cunningham Dance Company. unCAGEd featured a varied group of Detroit and Ann Arbor-based exploratory artists, musicians and performers working/playing in the Cage frame of chance, reflecting the pure energy felt in Cunningham's guided improvisation.

In November 2004, after 25 years of nomadic existence, CAID took up residence at 5141 Rosa Parks Boulevard, in the space formerly occupied by the Detroit Contemporary. The newly remodeled gallery serves as an exhibition and performance space, along with the administrative offices for the organization.

== Funk Night Raid ==
Early Saturday morning, May 31, 2008, a Detroit police SWAT team raided the museum during its monthly Funk Night, forced more than 130 people to the ground at gunpoint citing "after-hours dancing and drinking" without proper permits charged 116 people with loitering and impounded 44 cars . The raid was later ruled unconstitutional by a United States District Court in a lawsuit by the ACLU .
