= Detroit Artists Market =

Coordinates: 42.35479°N 83.06343°W

- Formation: 1932; 94 years ago
- Type: Nonprofit
- Legal status: 501(c)(3)
- Purpose: Art gallery and business incubator
- Headquarters: 4719 Woodward Avenue; Detroit, Michigan 48201; United States
- Website: detroitartistsmarket.org
- Formerly called: Detroit Young Artists Market

Detroit Artists Market (DAM) is the oldest continuously running non profit gallery in the Midwest. The DAM is a contemporary art gallery in Detroit, Michigan located in the cultural Midtown neighborhood near the Detroit Institute of Arts and Wayne State University.

The DAM was created in 1932 and was originally known as the Detroit Young Artists Market. Its mandate was to give exhibition opportunities to artists under thirty, but by 1936, the gallery was renamed to the Detroit Artists Market, favoring emerging and established Detroit artists.

== See also ==
- Detroit Institute of Arts
- Scarab Club
- Museum of Contemporary Art Detroit

== Sources ==
- Rebecca, Massei, Board Games High Hopes and Confusion Behind the Scenes at Detroit Artists Market, Metro Times, 24 August 2005
- Begin, Sherri, Painting a Greener Picture; Detroit Artists Market hopes new director, marketing plan boosts bottom line, Crain's Detroit Business 16 April 2007
