= Cass Technical High School =

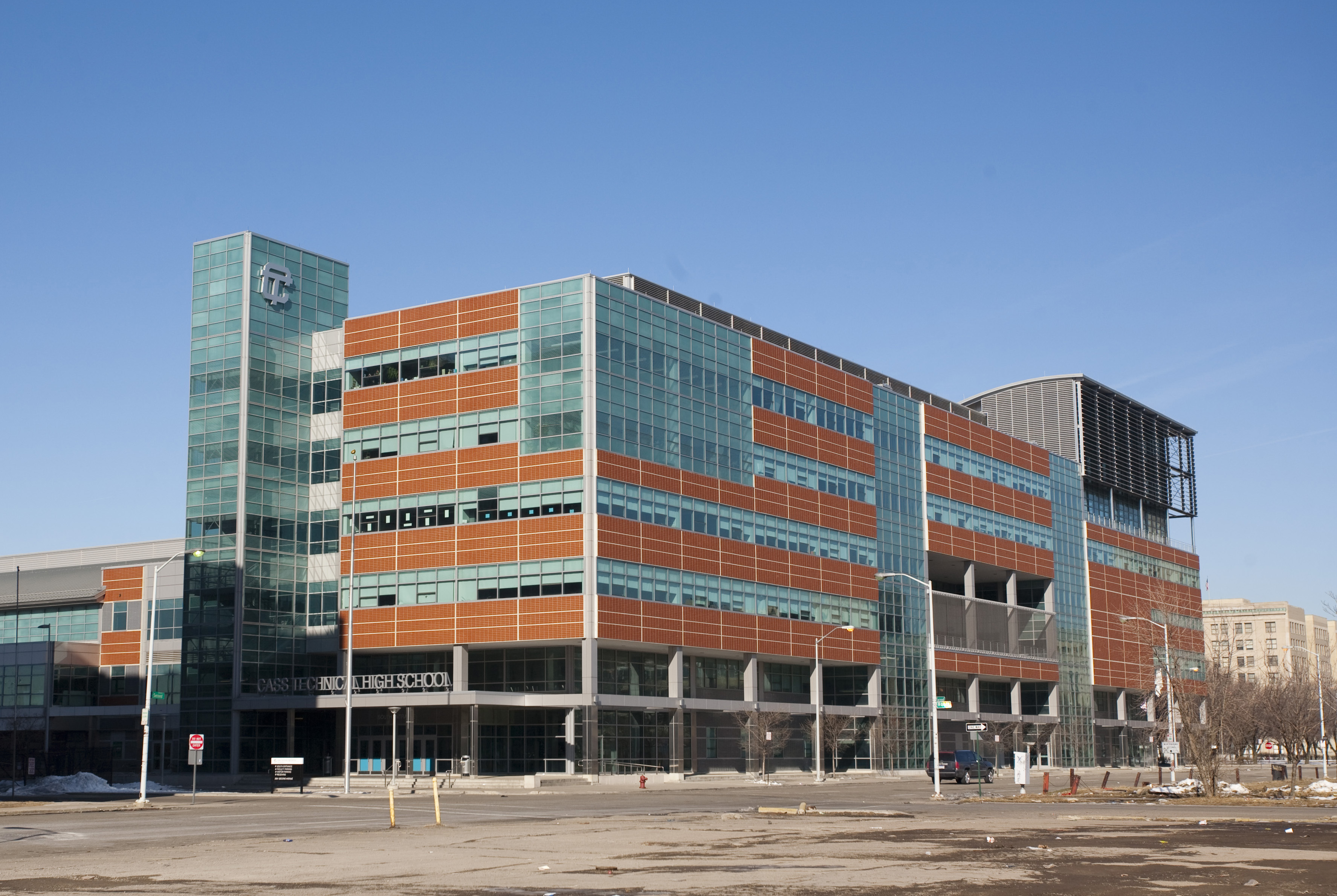
- The school in 2010

Location
- 2501 Second Avenue; Detroit, Michigan 48201; United States; 42°20′19.815″N 83°3′37.379″W

Information
- Other name: Cass Tech
- Type: Public magnet high school
- Motto: Cass Tech #1, Second To None
- Established: 1907
- School district: Detroit Public Schools Community District
- NCES School ID: 260110304669
- Principal: Lisa Phillips
- Teaching staff: 103.80 (on an FTE basis)
- Grades: 9–12
- Gender: Co-educational
- Enrollment: 2,493 (2024–2025)
- Student to teacher ratio: 24.02
- Campus type: Urban
- Colors: Forest green and white
- Athletics conference: Michigan High School Athletic Association (MHSAA)
- Nickname: Technicians
- Newspaper: CT Visionary
- Website: casstech.detroitk12.org

- Lewis Cass Technical High School (former Cass campus)
- Formerly listed on the U.S. National Register of Historic Places
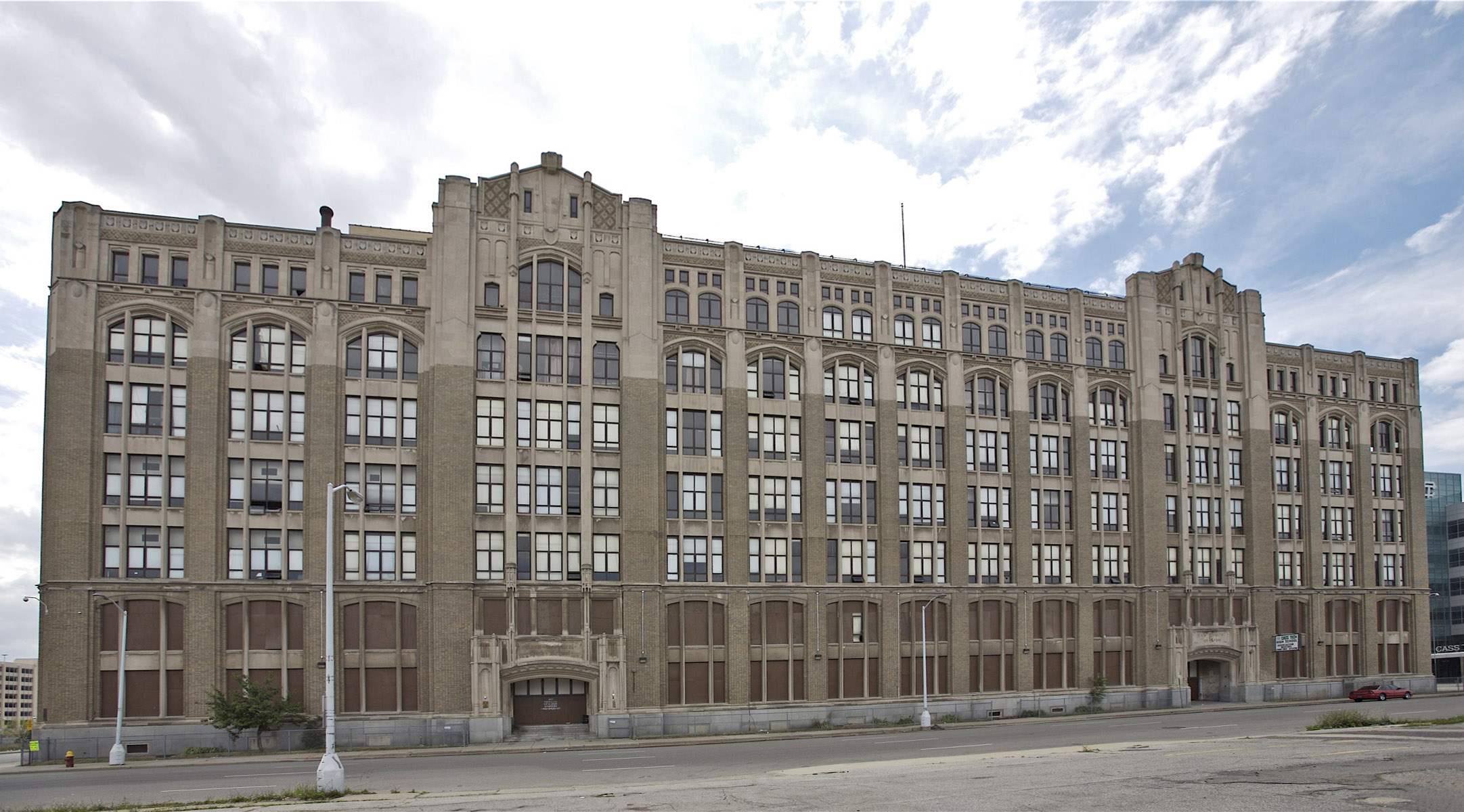
- 1922 building, 2007

- Location within Michigan Location within the United States
- Location: 2421 Second Avenue, Detroit, Michigan, United States
- Coordinates: 42°20′15″N 83°3′36″W
- Built: 1922
- Architects: Malcolmson and Higginbotham, Albert Kahn
- Demolished: July 2011
- MPS: Public Schools of Detroit MPS
- NRHP reference No.: 10000644

Significant dates
- Added to NRHP: March 29, 2011
- Removed from NRHP: December 2, 2024

Lewis Cass Technical High School (simply referred to as Cass Tech) is a four-year public magnet high school in Midtown Detroit, Michigan, United States. It was established in 1907 and is part of the Detroit Public Schools Community District. It is named after army officer, politician, and slavery advocate Lewis Cass.

Until 1977, Cass was Detroit's only magnet school and the only non-neighborhood enrollment school in Detroit. It remains one of few magnet schools in Detroit. Entrance is based on test scores and middle school grades. Students are required to choose a curriculum path—roughly equivalent to a college "major" —in the ninth grade. Areas of study include among others arts and communication, business management and marketing, engineering and manufacturing, human services, and science and arts.

== History ==
=== 1860-1912 ===
Cass Union School was built in 1860 and received an addition in 1883. At the corner of Second Street and Grand River Avenue, it held the first iteration of Cass Technical High School, which was established there in 1907 on the third floor. A new wing was added in 1909 to house the program. The school was mostly destroyed by a fire on November 16, 1909, but the new wing remained.

=== 1912 to 1922 ===
A new building for Cass Tech was built on the site and opened in October 1912. It was later known as Detroit High School of Commerce. A long waiting list of students formed, as the school's industrial and business education programs were in high demand. After a large new section of the building opened in 1922, the 1912 section stood until being demolished for freeway construction in 1964.

=== 1922 to 2005 ===
Designed in Collegiate Gothic style by Malcolmson and Higginbotham with Albert Kahn as construction architect, a new eight-story building began construction in 1916. The cornerstone was laid in 1917, and after delays caused by World War I austerity measures, the building opened in September 1922. It had a capacity of 3,600 students and was connected to the High School of Commerce, which had opened earlier that year in Cass Tech's former building. The two schools were connected by Victory Memorial Arch, a pedestrian bridge over Main Street that served as a memorial to students killed in the war. Like the current building, city leaders complained that the project had exceeded its budget. By 1942 the school had more than 4,500 students and was the largest in Michigan.

Daphnee Denis of Slate stated that the building had "classic and imposing architecture" that "made high-schoolers feel like they belonged to something great." She cited the words of Jack White, who stated: "Going to school there at age 14 was like all of sudden you were going to Harvard or something. It seemed like you were going to college."

In 1985, an addition on the south side was opened, designed by Albert Kahn & Associates, which included performing arts facilities, a new pool, and a student cafeteria, and a wing of the building was remodeled for computer and business classes. Departments in the 1922 building were grouped by floor; facilities included a foundry and machine shops that were used for training by Ford outside school hours, and the auditorium was used as a practice hall by the Detroit Symphony Orchestra. The 1922 building was added to the National Register of Historic Places in March 2011.

When the present school opened, the former building, including the extension, was left vacant, with classroom fittings and supplies inside. The alumni association announced plans in April 2007 to renovate it as a multi-use center including arts spaces, retail, and residences, but in July 2007 a fire damaged the 1922 section. The school district listed the building for demolition later that year. Demolition began in December 2010 and was completed in August 2011. At the time of demolition, the school building was approximately 830,000 square feet (77,000 m^{2}) and weighed more than 100,000 short tons (91,000 t). Over 90% of the material in the building was recycled for other uses or as backfill.

The indie rock band Mattiel's 2017 song, "Cass Tech", laments the building's 2011 demolition.

=== 2005 to present ===
A new campus was completed in May 2005 in an adjacent lot on Grand River Avenue to the north of the original building. Designed by TMP Architecture of Bloomfield Hills, it opened for the 2005-2006 school year. At $127 million, it was the third-most expensive high school in the country. Funding came from a $1.5 billion construction bond issue approved by voters in 1994.

John Gallagher, architecture critic for the Detroit Free Press, called the building "an excellent modernist design" and an example of new architectural styles in the city:

The contrast between new and old can be seen most clearly at the new Cass Tech High School off Grand River and Third, near downtown. Sitting side-by-side with the older Cass Tech, the new building represents an abrupt leap ahead in style and inspiration... It embodies many of the best attributes of modernism, from its unadorned lines to its soaring open spaces framed by glass and steel. Natural daylight spills in everywhere, and the new multistory library and media center provides panoramic vistas of the city.

In 2008, due to declining enrollment, teacher staffing was reduced and some classes that were not very popular with students were removed.

== Academics ==
Student assessments
- 2021-22 school year Change vs. prior year

M-STEP 11th grade proficiency rates (Science / Social Studies)
- Advanced %: 6.5 / 3.0
- Proficient %: 19.8 / 25.8
- PR. Proficient %: 18.6 / 59.1
- Not Proficient %: 55.0 / 12.1

Average test scores
- SAT Total: 952.0 (▼ −30.4)

Cass offers over twenty advanced placement courses including language composition, history, chemistry, calculus, and physics. Cass Tech students' strong academic performances draw recruiters from across the country, including Ivy League representatives eager to attract the top minority applicants. However, in 2019, Cass Tech was not among the 78 Michigan high schools with the highest average SAT scores. In 2021, U.S. News ranked Cass Tech 84th among Michigan high schools, and reported a 62.9% percentile score on the SAT.

=== Awards ===
In 1984, Cass Tech was honored by the U.S. Department of Education among 262 schools that should "shine as inspirational model for others," a list that included public and private schools.

In 2006, Cass represented DPS at the National Academic Games Olympics and won the Team Sweepstakes award.

== Music ==
=== Harp and vocal ===
The school's Harp program was established in 1925.

=== Bands ===
There are beginner, intermediate, advanced and jazz band classes, as well as a marching band. The CTMB (marching band), under the direction of Sharon Allen, has performed for Patti LaBelle, Sinbad, and Jay-Z as well as various college and university homecomings. The marching band was also a part of the 2007 Orange Bowl in Miami, Florida, but was not televised. In 2008, the band performed at Texas Southern University. In 2010, the CTMB participated in Norfolk State University's Homecoming and won first place in the McDonald's Battle of the Bands. The CTMB went to the 2013 inauguration for President Barack Obama.

The concert band program rose to prominence under the direction of Harry Begian, who led the Cass Tech bands from 1947 through 1964. Under his baton, the concert band performed twice at the Mid-West Band and Orchestra Clinic, and played literature at a level far beyond that normally performed by a public high school band, including the Symphony in B-flat by Paul Hindemith and La Fiesta Mexicana by H. Owen Reed.

== Athletics ==
=== Football ===
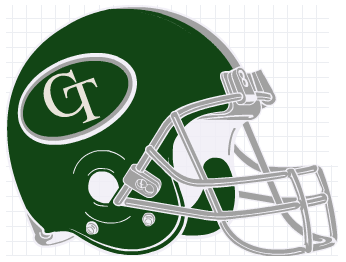
Cass Tech helmet.

The Cass Tech Technicians football team (also referred to as the Technicians) is a high school football program in Division 1 Public School League, representing Cass Technical High School.

Cass Tech won the 2011, 2012, 2016, and 2024 MHSAA Division I state championships.

=== Basketball ===
- 1956 Boys Class A State Champions
- 1975 Boys Class A State Champions
- 2023 Boys Division 1 State Champions

=== Track and field ===
Cass Tech's track and field history goes back to 1926 when Eddie Tolan and his teammate Loving won the interscholastic track meet at Northwestern University. Tolan came to be known as the "Midnight Express". He set world records in the 100-yard dash and 100 meters event and Olympic records in the 100 meters and 200 meters events. He was the first African-American to receive the title of the "world's fastest human" after winning gold medals in the 100 and 200 meters events at the 1932 Summer Olympics in Los Angeles. In March 1935, Tolan won the 75, 100 and 220-yard events at the World Professional Sprint Championships in Melbourne, Australia to become the first man to win both the amateur and professional world sprint championships. In his full career as a sprinter, Tolan won 300 races and lost only 7.

==== Northwestern Interscholastic Track Meet ====
- March 1926: 1st Place – National Champions
- March 1927: 3rd Place
- March 1928: 3rd Place

== Students ==
=== Demographics ===
As of 2022, approximately 2,400 students attended Cass Technical High School: 583 students in the ninth grade, 637 students in the tenth grade, 606 in the eleventh grade, and 575 in the twelfth grade.

In 2022 MJ Galbraith of Model D Media stated that "a sizable" group of students of Bengali heritage attend Cass Tech.

=== Ethnicity distribution ===
Of the students attending Cass Technical High School in 2021–22, 1,832 (76.2%) of them are Black, 277 (11.5%) are Hispanic, 223 (9.3%) are Asian, 57 (2.4%) are White, 6 (0.2%) are American Indian or Alaska Native, and 9 (0.4%) are multi-racial. 65.0% of the students are female.

== Notable alumni ==
=== Art, architecture and design ===
- Rebecca Allen, artist in computer graphics, animation, and interaction
- Harry Bertoia, artist, sound art sculptor, and modern furniture designer
- John DeLorean, engineer, inventor and executive in the U.S. automobile industry
- Niels Diffrient, industrial designer
- DeWitt Sanford Dykes Sr., architect, minister
- LeRoy Foster, painter
- Dorothy Henry, cartoonist and illustrator
- Ray Johnson, artist
- Emeline King, industrial designer for Ford Motors
- John Kloss, fashion designer
- Stanley Lechtzin, jewelry and metals artist
- Judy Pfaff, artist
- Charles Pollock, industrial designer
- Renée Radell, painter
- Bill Robinson (auto designer), industrial designer
- Berta Rosenbaum Golahny, painter, printmaker, and sculptor
- Ruth Adler Schnee, textile and interior designer
- Maya Stovall, artist and anthropologist
- Harold Varner, architect in Detroit

=== Arts and entertainment ===
- Chanté Adams, actress
- Nicco Annan, actor, writer and choreographer
- Dorothy Ashby, jazz harpist and composer
- Geri Allen, jazz pianist, composer, and recording artist
- Sean Anderson aka Big Sean, rapper, singer and songwriter
- Warren Benson, composer
- Kenny Burrell, jazz guitarist and composer
- Ellen Burstyn, actress
- Donald Byrd, jazz and rhythm-and-blues trumpeter, and vocalist
- Bobby Byrne, bandleader, trombonist, and music executive
- Regina Carter, jazz violinist
- Ron Carter, jazz double bassist
- Paul Chambers, jazz double bassist
- Alice Coltrane, jazz musician and composer
- Muriel Costa-Greenspon, mezzo-soprano
- Jerald Daemyon, electric violinist
- Delores Ivory Davis, soprano
- Artie Fields, bandleader, songwriter, record producer and jazz trumpeter
- Curtis Fuller, jazz trombonist
- Carole Gist, TV host, model and first African American woman to win the Miss USA title
- Wardell Gray, jazz tenor saxophonist who straddled the swing and bebop periods
- David Alan Grier, actor and comedian
- J. C. Heard, swing, bop, and blues drummer
- Major Holley, jazz upright bassist
- Ali Jackson, jazz drummer
- Michael R. Jackson, playwright, composer, and lyricist
- Philip Johnson, actor
- Ella Joyce, actress
- Hugh Lawson, jazz pianist
- Kirk Lightsey, jazz pianist and composer
- Donyale Luna, model and actress
- Merrick McCartha, actor
- Howard McGhee, one of the first bebop jazz trumpeters
- Al McKibbon, jazz double bassist
- Joe Messina, jazz and Motown guitarist, The Funk Brothers member
- Billy Mitchell, jazz tenor saxophonist
- Kenya Moore, actress, model, producer, author, television personality, and entrepreneur
- Naima Mora, fashion model
- J. Moss, gospel musician, composer, producer and arranger
- Greg Phillinganes, keyboardist, singer-songwriter, and musical director
- Della Reese, jazz and gospel singer, actress, and ordained minister
- Frank Rosolino, jazz trombonist
- Diana Ross, singer, actress, and record producer
- Donald Sinta, classical saxophonist, educator, and administrator
- Cornelius Smith Jr., actor
- Scott Tennant, classical guitarist
- Mike Terry (saxophonist), baritone saxophonist, Funk Brothers, and Motown
- Lucky Thompson, jazz tenor and soprano saxophonist
- Lily Tomlin, actress, comedian, writer, singer and producer
- Jack White, singer, songwriter, multi-instrumentalist and producer
- Doug Watkins, jazz double bassist
- Gerald Wilson, jazz trumpeter, big band bandleader, composer/arranger, and educator
- Charles Wysocki, painter

=== Business ===
- Rosalind Brewer, businesswoman
- Esther Gordy Edwards, staff member and associate of her younger brother Berry Gordy's Motown
- Kevan Hall, fashion designer
- Tracy Reese, fashion designer
- Preston Tucker, automobile entrepreneur

=== Educators ===
- Charles Gilchrist Adams, professor at Harvard Divinity School
- David H. Sanford, professor of philosophy
- Heather Ann Thompson, Professor of History and Afroamerican and African Studies; Pulitzer-prize winning author

=== Fiction/non-fiction ===
- Daniel Okrent, writer and editor
- Raynetta Mañees, novelist and entertainer

=== Journalism, publishing and broadcasting ===
- Terry Foster, sports columnist and radio personality
- Ed Gordon, journalist
- Pat Harvey, broadcast journalist
- Gerald McDermott, filmmaker
- Michael Reghi, television play-by-play announcer and radio talk show host
- Shaun Robinson, television host
- Jenn White, journalist and radio personality

=== Law, government and public policy ===
- Richard H. Austin, Michigan secretary of state
- Karen Batchelor, attorney and genealogist
- Cora Brown, state senator
- George Cushingberry Jr., congressman
- Noah Hood, Michigan Supreme Court justice
- Kwame Kilpatrick, politician, mayor
- Kenneth Reeves, mayor
- Barbara-Rose Collins, congresswoman

=== Library and information science ===
- Nancy Pearl, librarian and best-selling author

=== Military ===
- Thomas E. White, businessman and Army officer
- Paul Wurtsmith, Army Air Forces general
- Vincent W. Patton III, Master Chief Petty Officer of the Coast Guard

=== Sports ===
- Darius Acuff Jr., NBA Player
- Tyson Acuff, college basketball player
- Joe Barksdale, NFL player
- David Boone, NFL player
- George Brown, NBA player
- Walter Clago, NFL player
- Will Campbell, NFL player
- Derrick Dial, NBA player
- Rob Edwards, NBA player
- Carmen Fanzone, MLB player
- Guy Frazier, NFL player
- Vernon Gholston, NFL player
- Curtis Greer, NFL player
- Harlan Huckleby, NFL player
- Lano Hill, NFL player
- Kalen King, NFL player
- Aaron Kyle, NFL player
- Jourdan Lewis, NFL player
- Bill Mayfield, NBA player
- Darris McCord, NFL player
- Dorie Murrey, NBA player
- A. J. Ofodile, NFL player
- Donovan Peoples-Jones, NFL player
- Del'Shawn Phillips, NFL player
- Chris Douglas Roberts, NBA player
- Tom Seabron, NFL player
- Arnie Simkus, NFL player
- Eddie Tolan, Olympic sprinter
- Clarence Williams, NFL player
