= Charles McGee (painter) =

American artist (1924–2021)

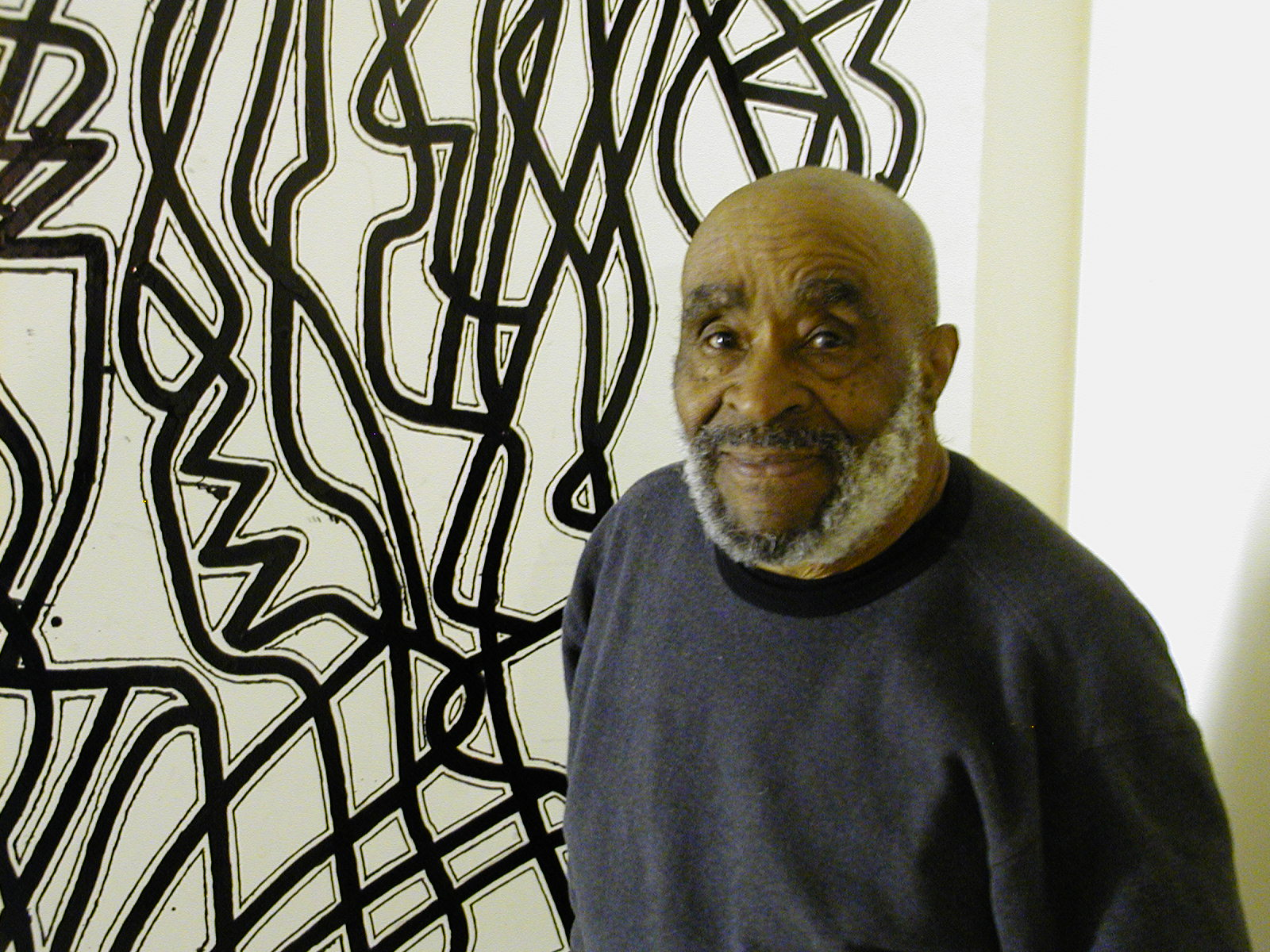
- Born: Charles William McGee; December 15, 1924; Clemson, South Carolina, U.S.
- Died: February 4, 2021 (aged 96); Detroit, Michigan, U.S.
- Education: College for Creative Studies
- Known for: Visual artist
- Awards: 2008 Kresge Eminent Artist

Charles McGee (December 15, 1924 – February 4, 2021) was an American artist and educator known for creating paintings, assemblages, and sculptures. His artwork is in the collections of the Detroit Institute of Arts and the Charles H. Wright Museum of African American History. He also had several large-scale public works in the city of Detroit.

== Early life and education ==
McGee was born in Clemson, South Carolina, on December 15, 1924. He was first raised by his grandparents, who were sharecroppers. He received his first artistic inspiration while picking cotton and helping his grandfather tend the land. There, "he observed firsthand the order and harmony that exists within nature." He had no formal schooling until moving to Detroit at age 10, where he found that "everything was on the move and it hasn’t slowed down yet." in 2017 he observed, "I learned something not being in school — because life is school . . .I learn something every time I move. Every time I go around a corner, something new is revealed to me.”

As a boy, McGee attended George Washington Elementary and took art classes at the McGregor Public Library in Highland Park. He attended Cleveland High School near Hamtramck and was active as a creative designer and coordinator of float construction for the school's parades. After high school, McGee went to work for Briggs Manufacturing Company in Detroit.

=== Military service ===
McGee enlisted in the Marine Corps in 1943 and served for three years, including during World War II. He was stationed in Nagasaki as part of the Allied occupation of Japan. After returning to Detroit, he took advantage of the GI Bill to attend classes at the College for Creative Studies, then known as the Society of Arts and Crafts.

== Career ==
The mediums McGee employed in the early part of his career were charcoal and painting. He had a one-year sojourn in Barcelona in 1968 to learn and sightsee. This experience represented a crossroads in his artistic career. The artwork he produced afterwards centered more on fundamental elements and less on subject matter, and he abandoned the realism that had dominated his early drawings. One notable exception to this was in Noah’s Ark: 'Genesis' (1984) at the Detroit Institute of Arts, which depicts two Egyptian-styled women and animals that are presented in "playful, abstracted simplicity". However, these human representations were created in line with the abstract form he adopted, with Jean Dubuffet named as a key inspiration. Nature was also a key theme in his work, inspired by his childhood experiences while outdoors picking cotton. One of his final works, Unity (2018) painted on the outside of 28 Grand Building, ties in with nature and human interaction.

McGee regularly taught art at Eastern Michigan University from 1969 until 1987. He also taught at the University of Michigan and the Birmingham Bloomfield Art Center. He established Gallery 7 and a small namesake School for the Arts where he taught. He was also responsible for preparing and curating art exhibitions.

McGee's paintings, assemblages and sculptures are held in U.S. and international collections, and are on permanent display at the Detroit Institute of Arts, the Dennos Museum, and the Charles H. Wright Museum of African American History.

McGee's work is installed in public settings, including the William Beaumont Hospital of Royal Oak, Michigan and the Detroit People Mover Broadway Station. He co-founded the Contemporary Art Institute of Detroit (CAID) in 1978. The Charles McGee Community Commons, dedicated by Marygrove College in 2016, stands at the corner of West McNichols Road and Wyoming Avenue in Detroit, across the street from the space that served as McGee's studio for over fifty years. McGee's Playscape II is the centerpiece of the Commons.

=== Detroit as a creative setting ===
According to the Kresge Foundation, "McGee developed an unwavering loyalty to the city and its residents, and endowed it with much of his artistic energy and artwork. 'Detroit really has been a heaven for me,' McGee explains. 'It has given me dignity and treated me with respect.'”

== Awards ==
McGee was named the inaugural Kresge Eminent Artist in 2008. Administered by the College for Creative Studies, this award honors one Detroit artist each year for professional achievements, cultural contributions, and commitment to the local arts community. The College also awarded him an honorary doctorate for his work as an artist and educator.

In early 2019, Michigan Legacy Art Park announced that McGee would receive its 2019 Legacy Award "in recognition of a lifetime of achievements and influences as an artist, teacher, advocate and global citizen."

== Later life ==
McGee suffered a stroke in 2011, which impacted his ability to produce art. He died on February 4, 2021, at his home in Detroit. He was 96, and died of natural causes.
