= Edson, Moore & Company =

- Industry: dry goods
- Founded: 1872
- Founder: Edson, Moore, Gillis, Baldwin
- Defunct: 1974
- Fate: Dissolved
- Headquarters: Detroit, U.S.
- Number of locations: Detroit, MI; Calumet, MI

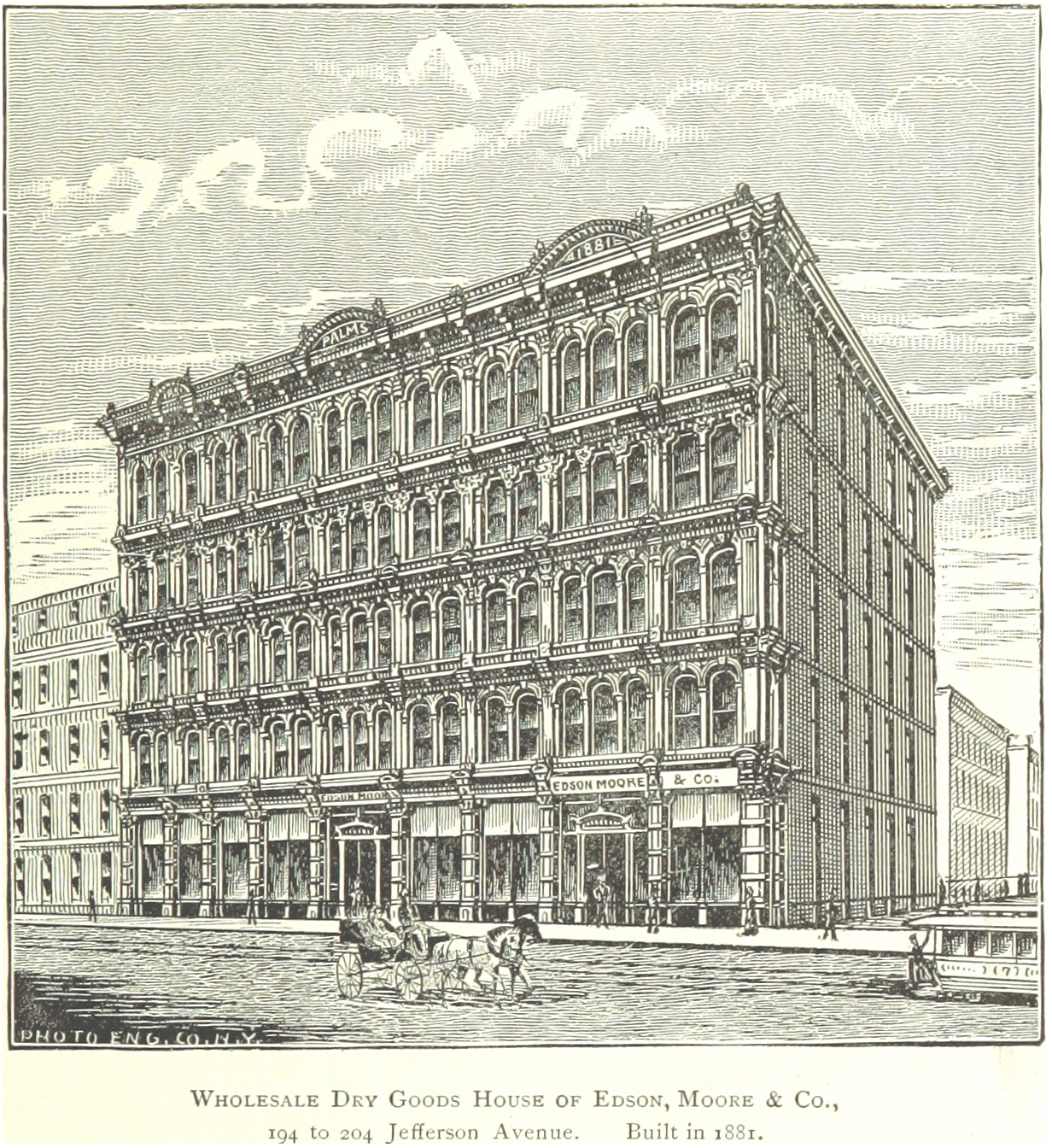
Edson Moore (Palms) building, Jefferson Avenue, Detroit

Edson, Moore & Co was a dry goods, importing and wholesale store started in 1872 in Detroit, Michigan by James L. Edson, Ransom Gillis, George F. Moore and special partner, Stephen Baldwin. The company was in operation from 1872 through 1974 when assets were sold.

== Establishing the firm ==
The firm began in 1872, when several former employees and partners of Allan Sheldon & Company (formerly Town & Sheldon) elected to form their own firm under the name Edson, Moore & Co. Those men were James L. Edson, George F. Moore, Ransom Gillis, Charles Buncher and Stephen Baldwin. Both Edson and Moore had been partners in the Allan Sheldon & Company firm. The new firm, Edson Moore, originally occupied the addresses of 190-192 Jefferson Avenue in Detroit. They quickly established themselves as one of the largest dry goods and wholesale businesses in Michigan occupying a larger store front on Jefferson Avenue from 194 through 204 in a building built expressly for their needs.

As a jobbing or wholesale house, they offered dry goods from American mills including flannel, percale, gingham and silk fabrics. They also offered finer articles of clothing from Europe including Irish and Scottish linens, hosiery and gloves from Saxony. In the early history of the firm, sales occurred only in the store itself and the items were packed by employees in the evening, for shipment. By 1887, they employed over 100 clerks and twelve travelling salesmen. In the early part of the 20th century the dry goods business changed, and the majority of business was conducted by travelling salesman. In 1908, for example, Edson Moore employed over 50 travelling salesmen covering sales in Michigan, Ohio, Indiana and Wisconsin.

=== Founders ===
==== James LaFayette Edson ====
Edson was born the oldest of five children in Batavia, New York on 31 July 1834 to Sarah Ames (Flint) and Lewis M. Edson. He had two brothers, John and Dallas, who died fighting for the Union side in the Civil War. After working at several dry goods stores in New York State, he moved to Michigan in December 1855. In Detroit he worked for and became a partner in the Allan Shelden & Company, a large dry goods store. There he met the future partners of the firm that would be his namesake.

In addition to founding the firm, he served as a director of the Peoples' Savings Bank and the Brush Electric Light Company. He promoted the Detroit Museum of Art and worked on the committee that selected the location of the post office in Detroit. He married Julia A. Collins and had two daughters, Mary A. and Lillian E. Edson died in Detroit on 25 August 1895.

==== George F. Moore ====
Moore was born one of twelve children to John and Clara Moore in Berkshire County, Massachusetts on 10 December 1832. Like James Edson, Moore worked in the dry goods business in New York State prior to coming to Detroit, which he did in 1859. Once in Detroit, he worked at the Sheldon firm, met Edson and together they started Edson, Moore and Co.

In 1855, he married Adela S. Mosher and together had five children: Edward H., George F., Jr., Willis Howard, Harriett L. and Adela S. Moore died on 25 March 1904 of heart trouble in Magnolia Springs, FL. He was the last surviving founder of the company. At the time of his death, he was survived by only one son and one daughter.

==== Ransom Gillis ====
Ransom Gillis was born 20 December 1838 in Washington County, New York to Alexander Gillis and Jane (Wilson). One of eight children, Ransom attended public schools and the Argyle Academy. He relocated to Detroit in 1864 and also found work at the Allen-Sheldon Dry Goods Company. When Edson, Moore & Co was started, Gillis did not have sufficient funds to put up to start the firm so he did not become a named partner. Ransom Gillis married Helen A. Gaylord in 1870 and together, they had three children: Ransom Fay, Gaylord Wilson, and Grace M. Both his son, Gaylord, and his grandson, Gaylord, Jr., succeeded him in business at Edson-Moore. On 31 December 1901, Ransom Gillis died of pneumonia.

==== Charles Buncher ====
Buncher was born in Lowell, Massachusetts to James and Maria (Leach) on 2 March 1839. After attending public schools, he joined a Boston dry goods firm by the name of Sweetser, Gookin and Company and later, Anderson, Cooke and Company. Those firms employed him as a representative of the then, western area, including Michigan. He then became associated with Edson Moore as a financial partner.

Buncher availed himself of other interests in his adopted home of Detroit, including the Detroit Museum of Art of which he was president during the 1898-1899 year. He was a trustee of the First Presbyterian church of Detroit and vice-president of the Detroit Archaeological Institute of America. Buncher's first wife, Josephine Dillaway, died in 1871. His second wife, Julia Howland of Troy, New York, died in 1889. He had three daughters, Mable from his first marriage and Jessie and Myra from his second.

==== Stephen Baldwin ====
In the formation of the firm, Baldwin was cited as a "special partner" as he was a wealthy capitalist. Baldwin was born in England on 31 July 1834 and emigrated to the United States with his parents, settling in New York State. In 1836, he moved to Pontiac, Michigan and after finishing school, was engaged in several businesses including farm implements and the produce and business commission in Pontiac. He became involved with oil, timber, and cloth manufacturing. In 1870, he purchased the Detroit Paper Company, selling in 1872, the year he assisted in the formation of Edson Moore Baldwin married Gertrude Hovey Baldwin in 1841 and died on 7 April 1909. He is buried in Oak Park Cemetery in Pontiac, Michigan.

=== Fire ===
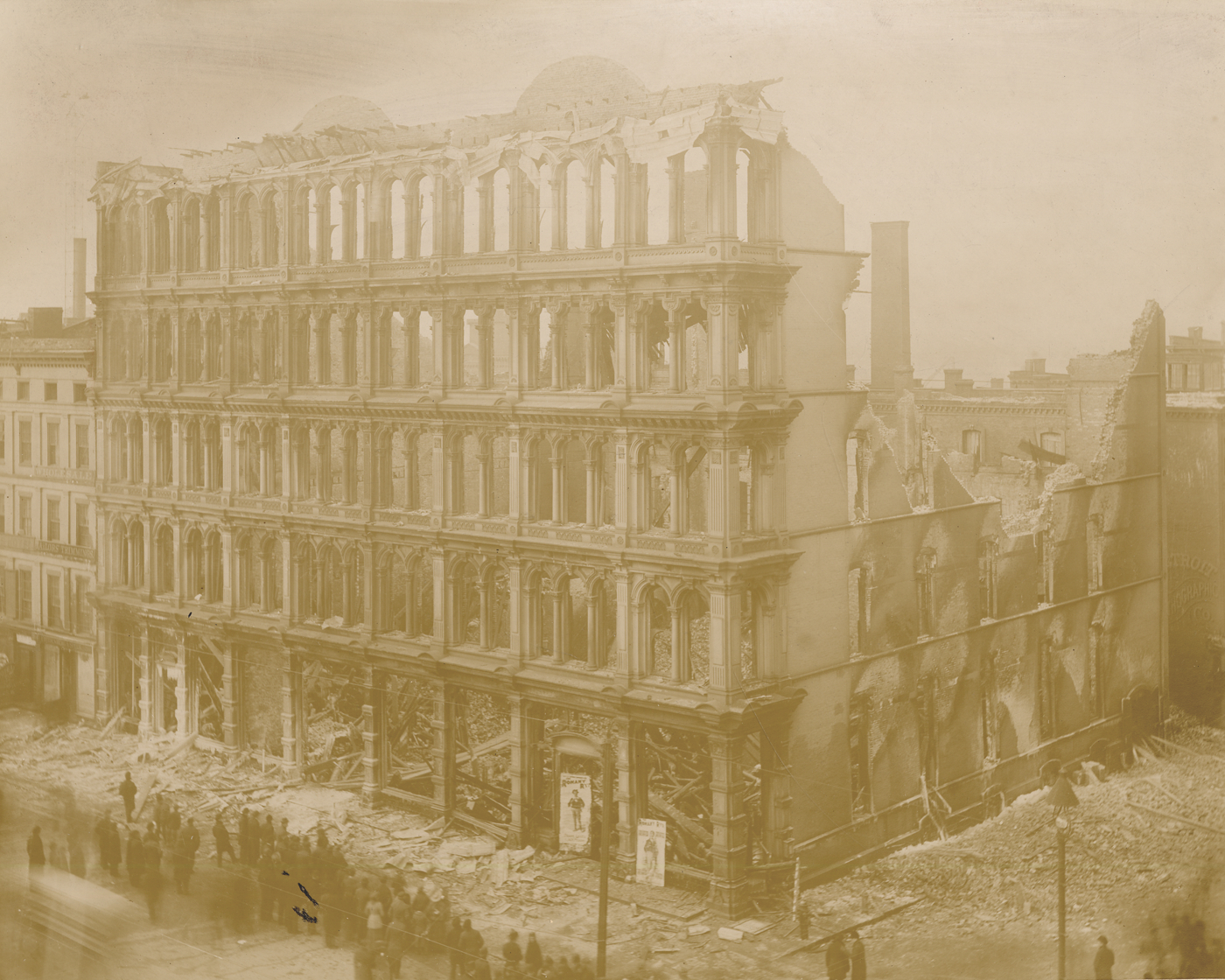
Edson Moore building after devastating fire, November 1893

During the lunch period on November 25, 1893, the building on Jefferson Avenue caught fire and was consumed by the flames. The fire started on the fifth floor near the elevators, where cotton batting and light goods were stored, and quickly spread to the remainder of the five-story building. It was suspected that one of the employees, against company policy, was smoking and the cotton ignited. Five employees were killed due to the fire and smoke and an additional two, jumped 75 feet out of fifth story windows, to their deaths. George Moore's son, Charles W. Moore was in the building on the third floor during the fire and managed to escape. Inventory that had been recovered from the fire was sold at auction in Chicago, Illinois in February 1894.

In December 1893, an inquest was held to determine the fault of the fire. The firm of Edson, Moore and Company was exonerated and that the fault lay with the building inspectors. Although additional inspections were requested by Edson, himself, the inspectors routinely reported that the building was sufficient for providing means of escape during fires. They agreed with the national board of building inspectors who held that when a building has two or more means of escape by means of stairs, outside fire escapes are unnecessary. The jury in this case did not agree. They stated:

The jury find that while the evidence exonerates the firm of Edson, Moore & Co., from blame in the matter, it shows culpable neglect and inefficiency on the part of the public officials whose duty it is to determine and direct the erection of proper and adequate means of escape in case of fire or other disaster.

== 20th century ==
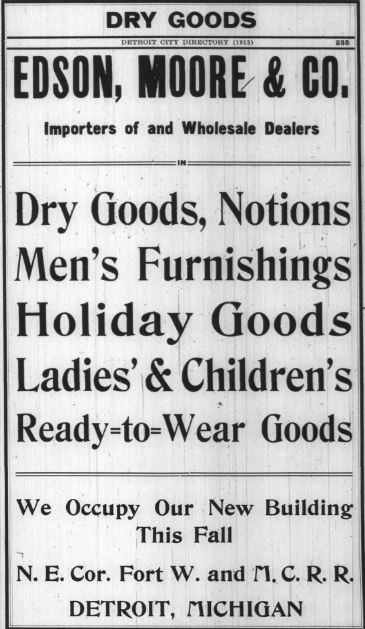
Edson, Moore & Co Advertisement from 1913 Detroit City Directory

At the turn of the century, Edson Moore filed articles of incorporation and appointed their first president, Abram Sherrill, a former book-keeper turned partner with the firm.

In 1910, the journal "Trade" reported that the firm was opening a branch office in Calumet, Michigan. Before the announcement, travelling salesmen for the firm had to carry samples of the goods with them around the Upper Peninsula. One salesman had to carry fifteen trunks with him to demonstrate the wares of the company. The addition of the branch office was reported accordingly: "aggressive work like this cannot fail to add appreciably to the volume of business Detroit is getting from the upper peninsula". The business plan was to support the area around Calumet using the established trolley lines. They then added another Upper Peninsular branch office in Ishpeming which served Marquette and Negaunee, Michigan.

In November, 1913, Edson Moore moved into a $200,000 fireproof building (now The Assembly Apartments) designed by architects Smith, Hinchman & Grylls, located in Detroit at the corner of West Fort Street and the main line of the M.C.R.R. The structure was "let" by the Dodge Brothers with by Bryant and Detwiler operating as general contractors.(Bryant and Detwiler also built the Packard Plant in Detroit) The property on Jefferson Avenue was purchased by the D.U.R. in an effort to consolidate railway office locations.

In 1915, the firm announced that it purchased $225,000 in inventory of Sheldon Dry Goods Company, of Columbus Ohio. The Sheldon Dry Goods Company, founded by Robert Emmett Sheldon, went out of business in 1915.

In 1921, the city of Detroit changed its building numbering system and the address of Edson Moore became 1702 West Fort Street.

=== Closure ===
The company narrowed its product line to focus on hosiery and carpets. In 1958, the facility on Fort street was sold and the inventory warehoused at 7650 W. Chicago in Detroit. This new location afforded more warehouse space. The company could no longer compete with large department stores and sold the balance of its inventory to the New York Floor Covering Company in 1974 and closed its doors.

== Gallery ==
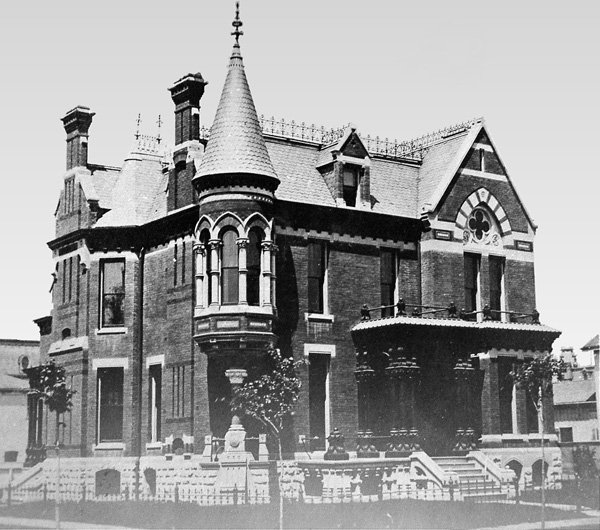
Ransom Gillis House, on 205 Alfred built in 1879 and designed by Henry T Brush and George D Mason.

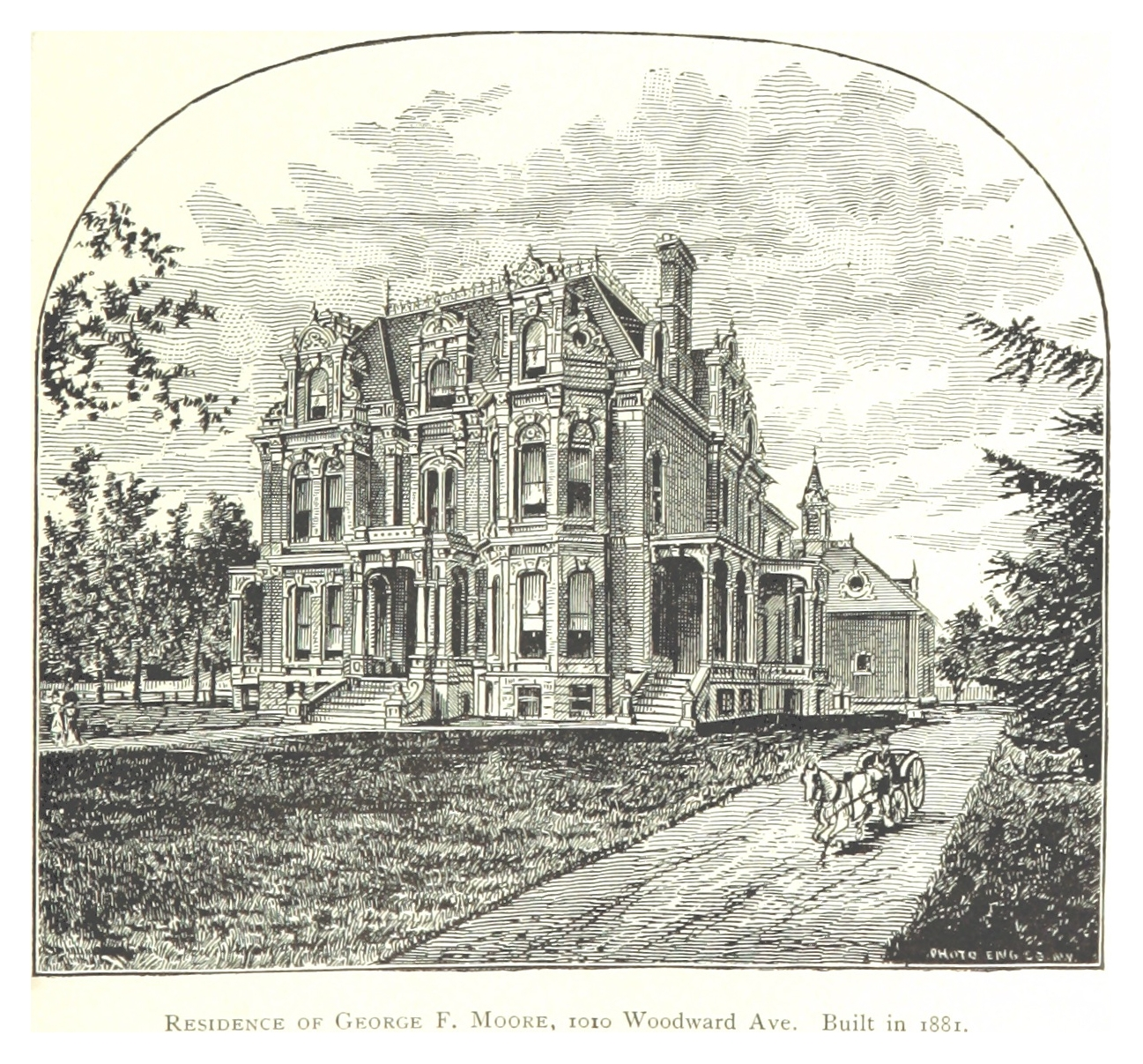
George Moore Residence on 5601 Woodward Avenue built in 1881 and designed by Gordon W Lloyd.

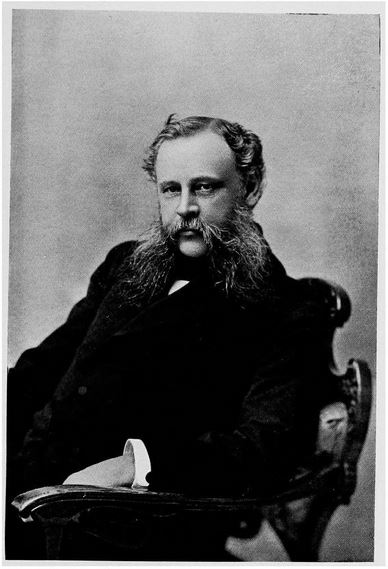
Portrait of Charles Buncher c. 1898

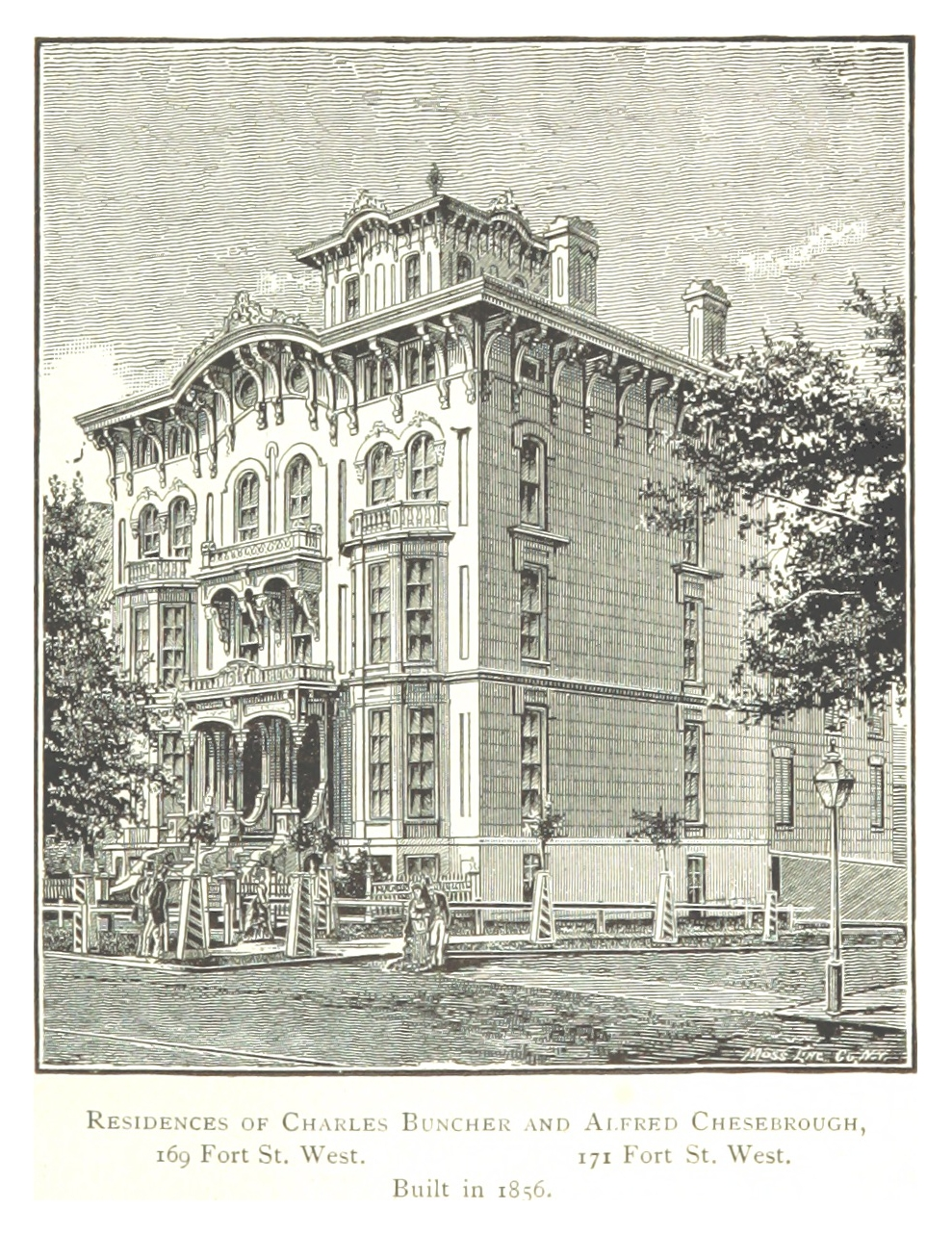
Charles Buncher and Alfred Chesebrough double-family house 169 W. Fort St.

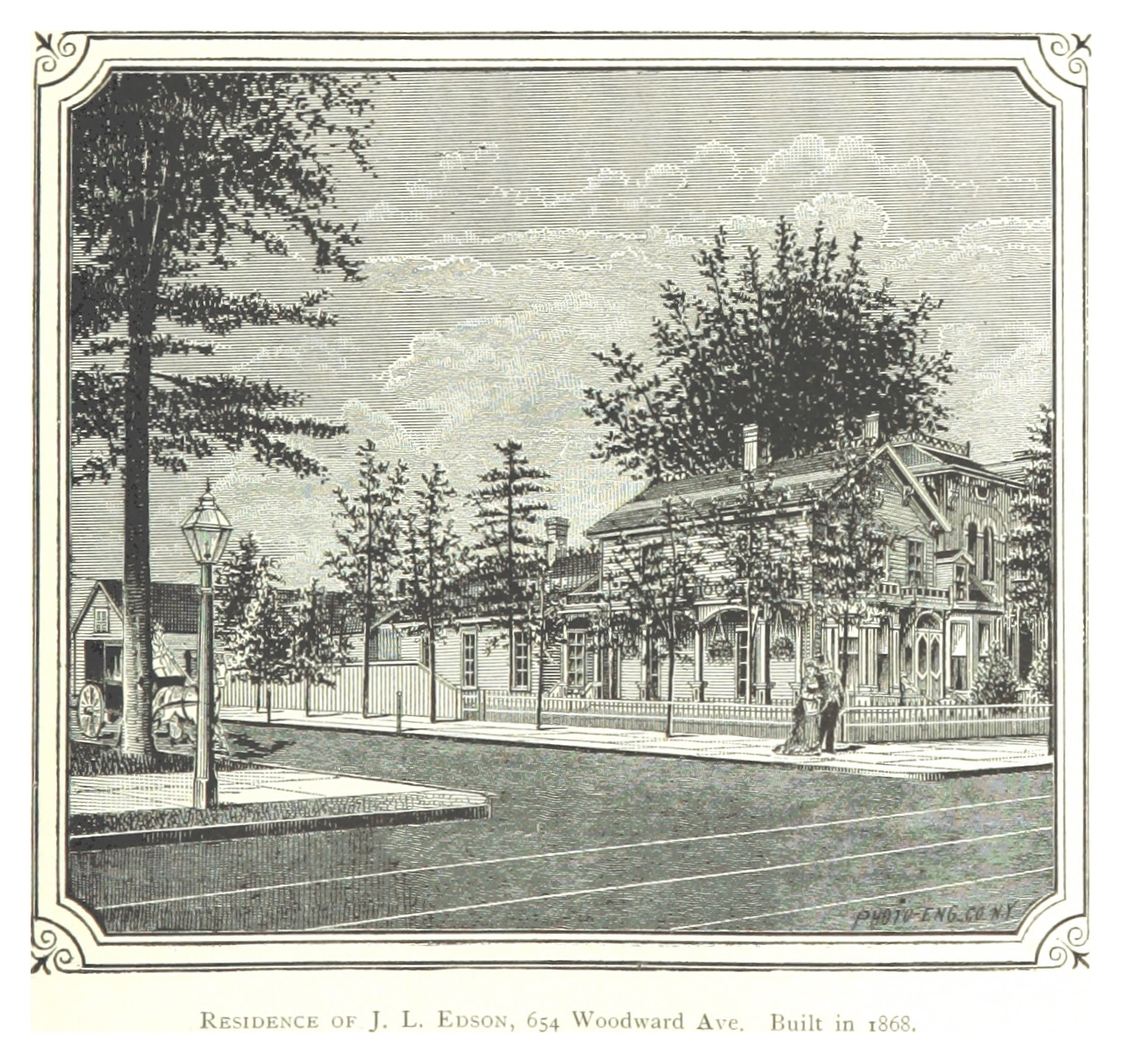
Residence of James LaFayette Edson in 3654 Woodward built in 1868.
