= Ransom Gillis House =

Historic house in Michigan, United States

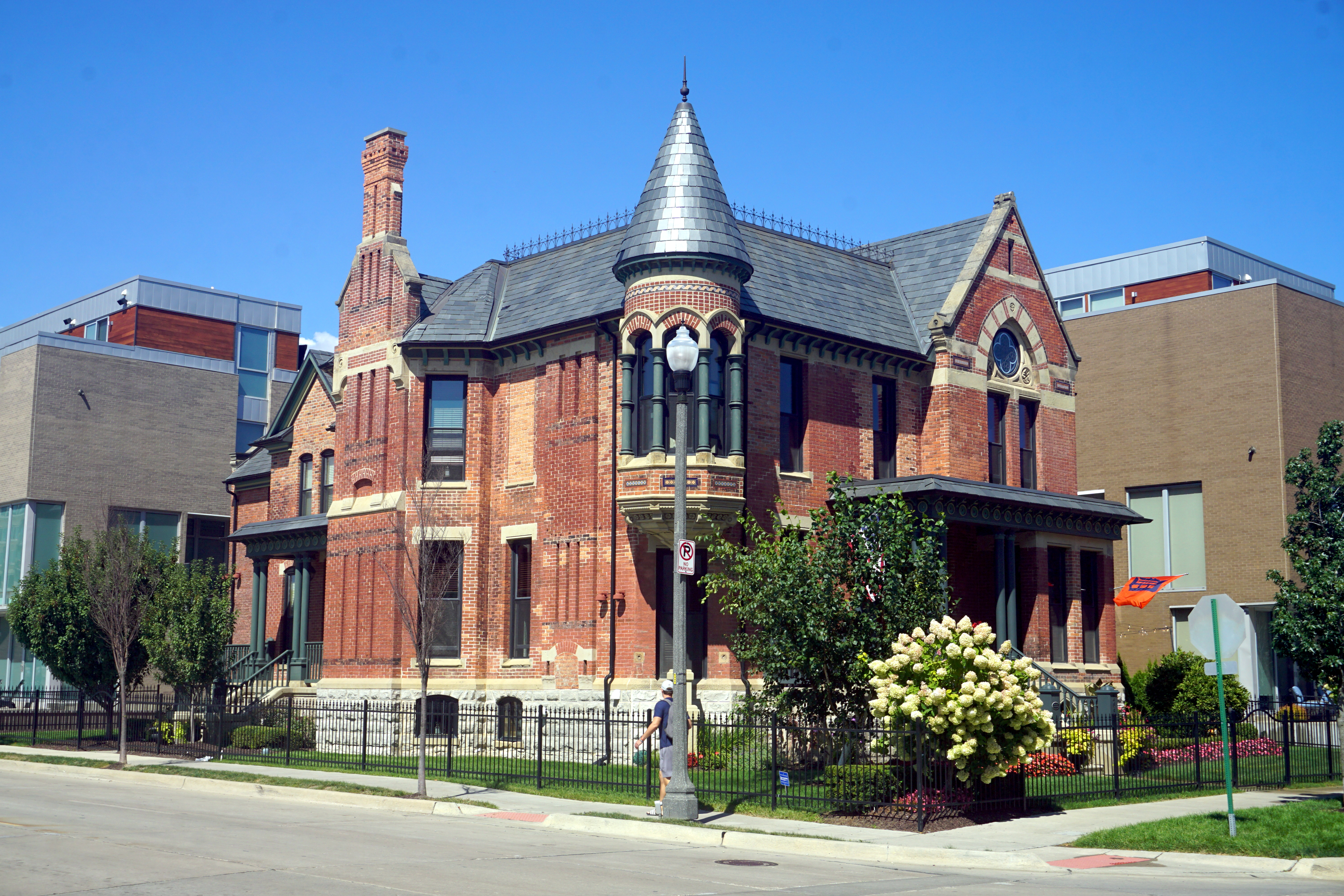
- Interactive map of the Ransom Gillis House area

General information
- Architectural style: Venetian Gothic
- Location: 205 Alfred Street; Detroit, Michigan
- Coordinates: 42°20′38.27″N 83°3′8.96″W
- Completed: 1876

Design and construction
- Architects: Henry T. Brush & George D. Mason

Other information
- Public transit: QLine Sproat Street/Adelaide Street; DDOT 4 SMART FAST Woodward 461, 462

The Ransom Gillis House is a historic home located at 205 Alfred Street (formerly 63 Alfred prior to renumbering) in Midtown Detroit, Michigan, within the Brush Park district. It was designed by Henry T. Brush and George D. Mason and built between 1876 and 1878. The structure, unoccupied since the mid-1960s, was "mothballed" by the City of Detroit in 2005–2006, in hopes of restoration in the future. On November 1, 2015, the completely refurbished home opened its doors to the public after a thorough renovation in a joint project between HGTV, Rehab Addict's Nicole Curtis, and Detroit-based mortgage lender Quicken Loans. The project resulted in an eight-part special that aired on HGTV.

== History ==
The Ransom Gillis House was built at a cost of $12,000 for Ransom Gillis, a wholesale dry goods merchant. The property was sold by Gillis in 1880. The house and property passed through the hands of four different upper-income families between 1880 and 1919. After this time, the main structure was converted into a rooming house, along with most of the other structures on the street. The carriage house behind the structure was rented by Mary Chase Perry Stratton in 1903, becoming the first home of Pewabic Pottery. The pottery moved in 1906, and the carriage house was then occupied by an auto repair shop, a battery service shop, and finally a filling station, before being torn down and replaced by a restaurant in 1935. The restaurant operated until the 1960s and was demolished in 2005-2006, as part of the city's "mothballing" work on the property.

A storefront was added to the front of the Ransom Gillis House in the late 1930s and was operated along with the rooming house until the mid-1960s. Various attempts were made to restore the main structure in the 1970s, 1980s, and mid-2000s, none of which succeeded.

As of 2001, the City of Detroit was the legal owner of the property.

== Architecture ==
The Ransom Gillis House brought to Detroit the Venetian Gothic style, made popular by John Ruskin's book The Stones of Venice. The centerpiece of the structure is the turret situated in the front left corner, the circumference of which is accented by five rows of tiles of simple geometric designs in hues of bright blue, red, yellow, and brown. Similar tile work was spread throughout the rest of the structure. The base of the turret is decorated with stone carvings of quadruplets of flower blossoms, similar but all slightly different. The turret was supported from below by an ornate stone post. Dark, ornately carved wood columns enclosed the porch at the entrance to the house. Lastly, a steep, dark slate mansard roof with ornate iron cresting completed the peaks in a traditional detail of the day.

== Restoration ==
On March 25, 2015, the Detroit Free Press announced that Nicole Curtis would be restoring the home on her TV series, Rehab Addict. Curtis spoke of the project, saying, "The energy here [Detroit] is unreal and it's unmatched anywhere else. For doing what I do, to be in a city that's excited for us to be here and not fighting us? It's a huge thing." Work on the house began in the summer of 2015. Curtis led the renovation of the 1876-built mansion for an eight-part HGTV series sponsored by Quicken Loans, the mortgage lender founded by local billionaire Dan Gilbert. The series originally aired in November 2015.

== Gillis' life and work ==
Ransom Gillis

Ransom Gillis was born on December 20, 1838, in Washington County, New York, to Alexander Gillis and Jane Wilson. Ransom, one of eight children, attended public schools and the Argyle Academy. He relocated to Detroit in 1864 and found work at the Allen-Sheldon Dry Goods Company. He worked there until 1872, when he founded Edson, Moore & Company with colleagues James L. Edson and George F. Moore. Gillis operated as the "buyer of the house". Edson, Moore, & Company ultimately grew to span 194 through 204 Jefferson Avenue, with an area of 125 x 120 feet. They featured wholesale dry goods such as Irish and Scottish linens, hosiery and gloves from Saxony, goods from Europe, and goods from American mills. In December 1893, the massive store on Jefferson was gutted by a fire that was estimated to do $750,000 in damage. Seven employees died in the fire, including two who were forced to jump from the fifth floor of the burning building. In November 1913, the firm relocated to a storefront at 494-514 Fort Street in Detroit. They advertised the new location as being at the north-east corner of Fort Street and M.C.R.R. (Michigan Central Rail Road).

Gillis married Helen A. Gaylord in 1870, and together they had three children: Ransom Fay, Gaylord Wilson, and Grace M.

Ransom Fay was born on November 3, 1871. He attended Yale University in 1894 and 1895.

Grace M. married David S. Carter and died in 1901.

Gaylord, born July 1, 1873, attended the University of Michigan and succeeded his father in the dry goods business, working for Edson, Moore & Company.

Gillis was a member of many key institutions in Detroit, including the Old Michigan Club, First Presbyterian Church, a board member of Grace Hospital, and the Lake St. Clair Fishing and Shooting Club. Ransom Gillis died on 31 December 1901 from pneumonia.

== Gallery ==
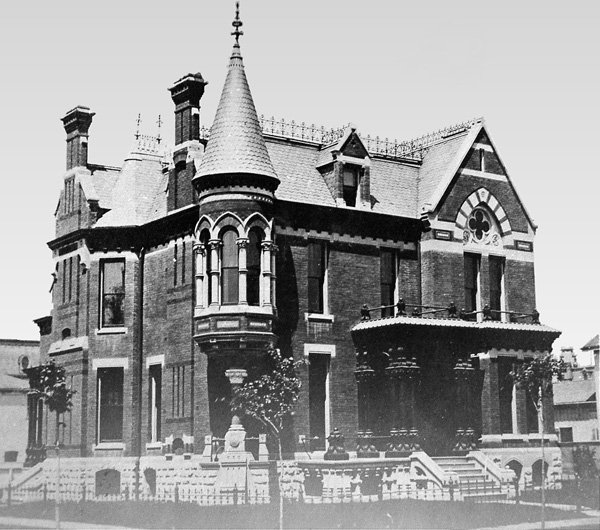
Ransom Gillis House, 1879

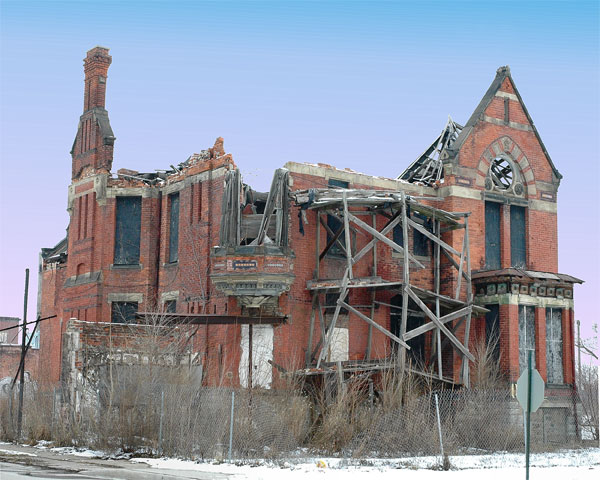
Ransom Gillis House, 2005

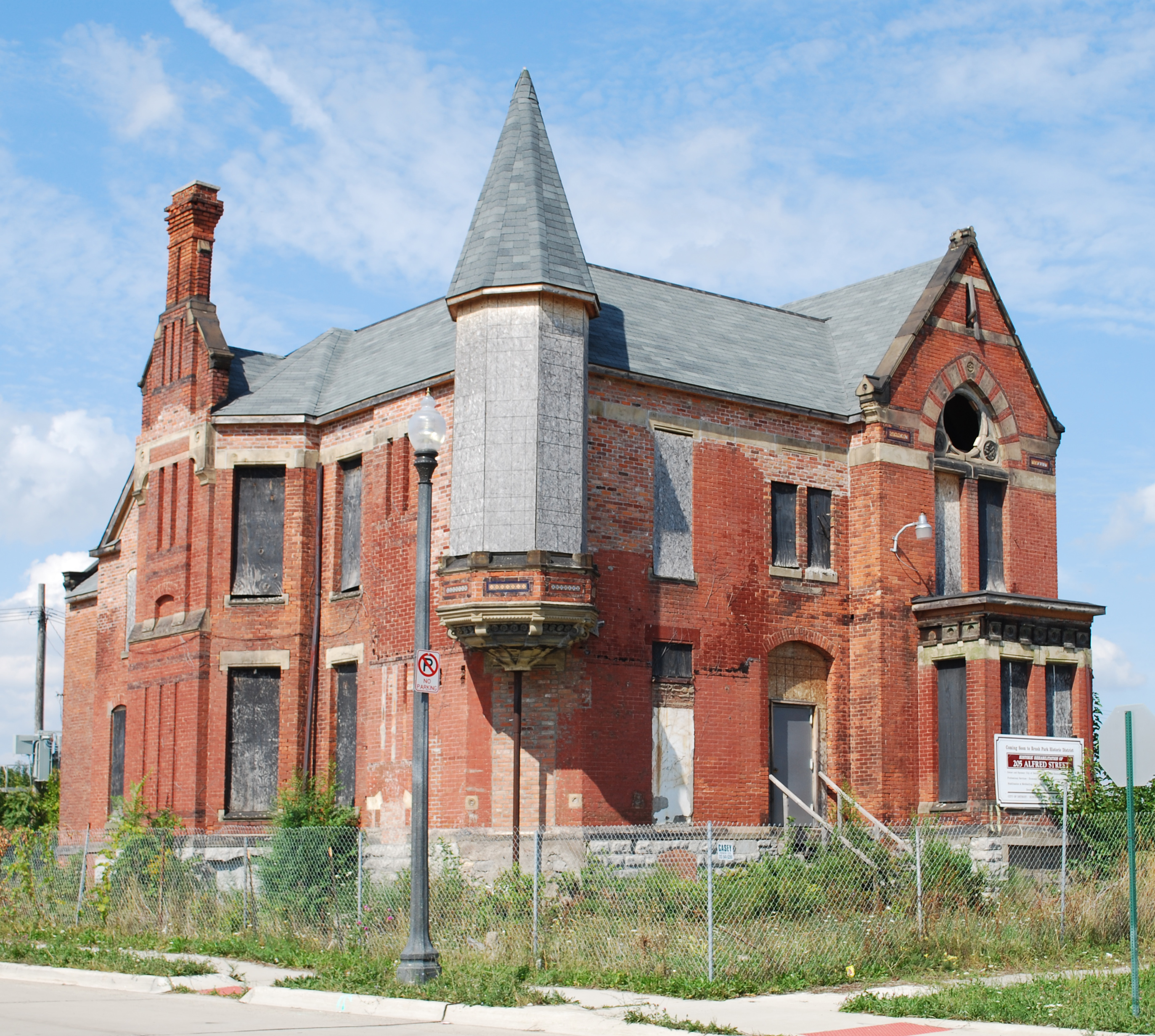
Ransom Gillis House, 2009

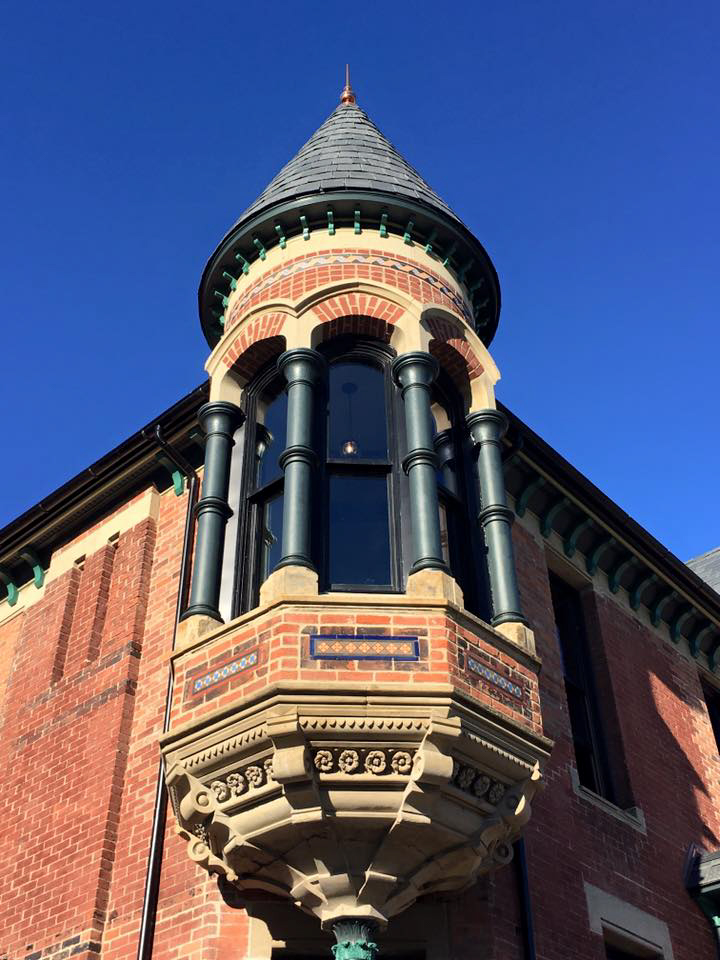
Ransom Gillis House front view of turret, 2015

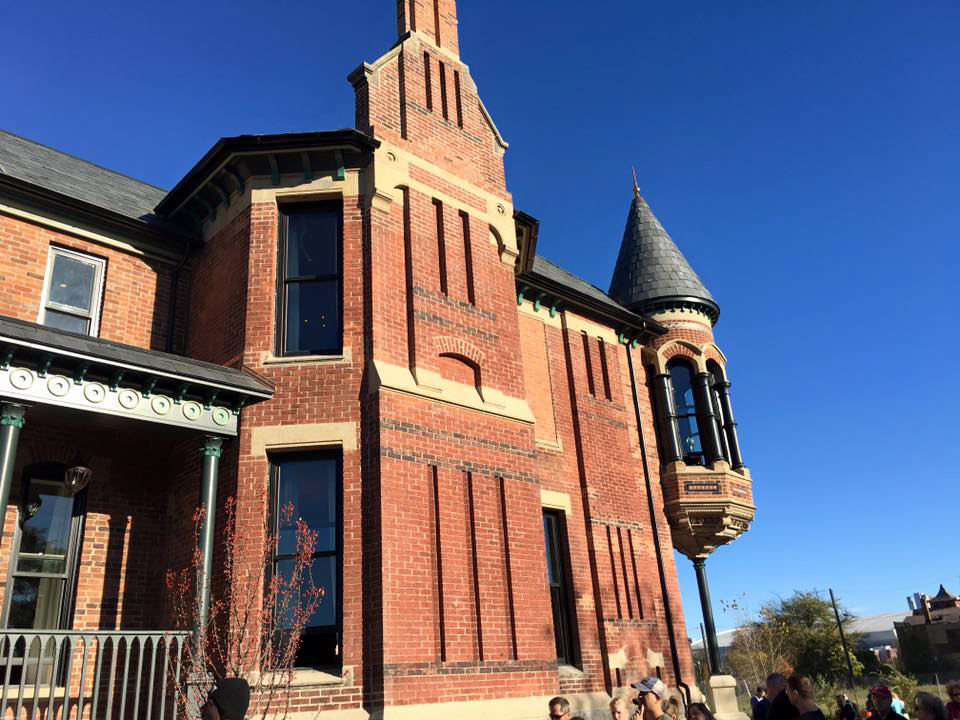
Ransom Gillis House fireplace chimney, 2015

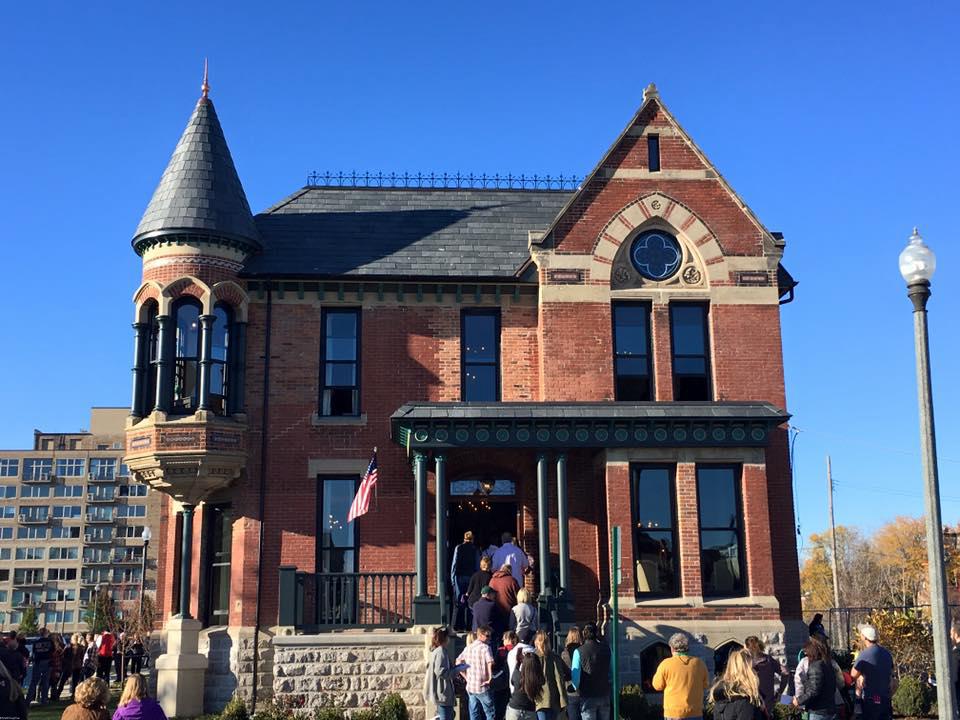
Ransom Gillis House front view, 2015
