= John M. Donaldson =

American architect (1854–1941)

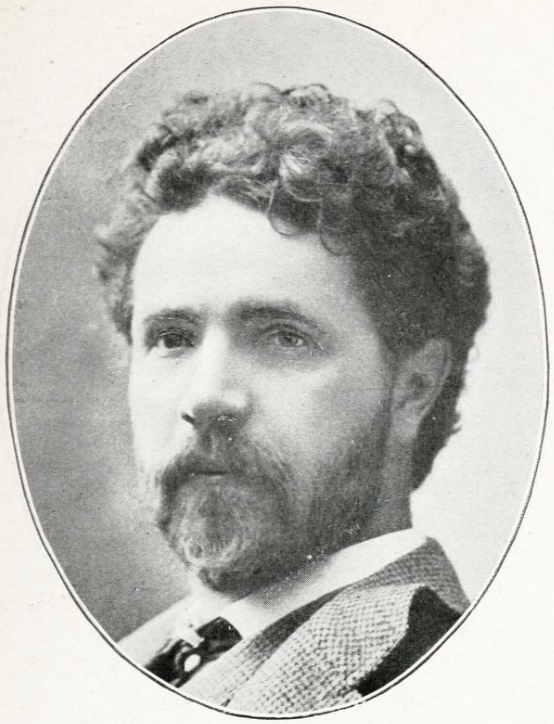
John Donaldson c. 1904

John M. Donaldson (January 17, 1854 – December 20, 1941) was an American architect and artist born on January 17, 1854, in Stirling, Scotland. Donaldson was principal designer of the successful Detroit-based architectural firm Donaldson and Meier from 1880 onwards.

== Early years ==
In 1856, John and Isabella (McNaughten) Donaldson immigrated to Detroit, Michigan with their two-year-old son John. He graduated from the Detroit Public Schools and later from the Polytechnic College. Following that he returned to Europe where he studied at the Academy of Fine Arts in Munich, Germany, at the École des Beaux-Arts in Paris, France, finishing his European art studies in Venice, Italy.

== Success in Detroit ==
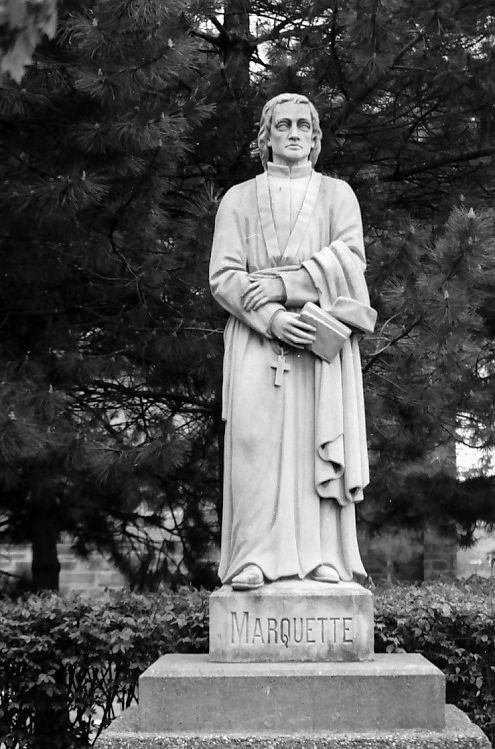
Statue of Pere Marquette at the Detroit City Hall

He returned to Detroit and in 1874 was invited to produce architectural sculpture for the Detroit City Hall then being built. For this building Donaldson made a model of a statue of Pere Marquette that was carved in stone by Julius Melchers. When the building was demolished in the 1950s the statue was salvaged and now stands on the campus of Wayne State University.

In 1878, Donaldson joined in partnership with architect Henry T. Brush, but Brush's death a year later in 1879 ended it. In 1882, Donaldson married Charlotte Grosvenor Brush, his former partner's widow. In 1880, he formed a partnership with Henry J. Meier, Donaldson and Meier. Though Meier died in 1917, the firm continued as Donaldson and Meier until the 1970s.

Donaldson was a member of the American Institute of Architects and the National Sculpture Society.

In 1900, Donaldson wrote a letter for the Detroit Century Box time capsule.

== Sources ==
- Eckert, Kathryn Bishop (1993). Buildings of Michigan. New York: Oxford University Press. ISBN 978-0-19-509379-7.
- Ferry, W. Hawkins, The Buildings of Detroit: A History, Wayne State University Press, Detroit, Michigan, 1968
- Gibson, Arthur Hopkin, Artists of Early Michigan: A Biographical Dictionary of Artists Native to or Active in Michigan, 1701-1900, Wayne State University Press, Detroit, 1975
- Hill, Eric J., and John Gallagher, AIA Detroit: The American Institute of Architects Guide to Architecture in Detroit, Wayne State University Press, Detroit, MI 2003
- Meyer, Katharine Mattingly and Martin C.P. McElroy, Detroit Architecture: A.I.A. Guide, Wayne State University Press, Detroit, 1980
