= The Assembly Apartments =

- Edson, Moore and Company Building
- U.S. National Register of Historic Places
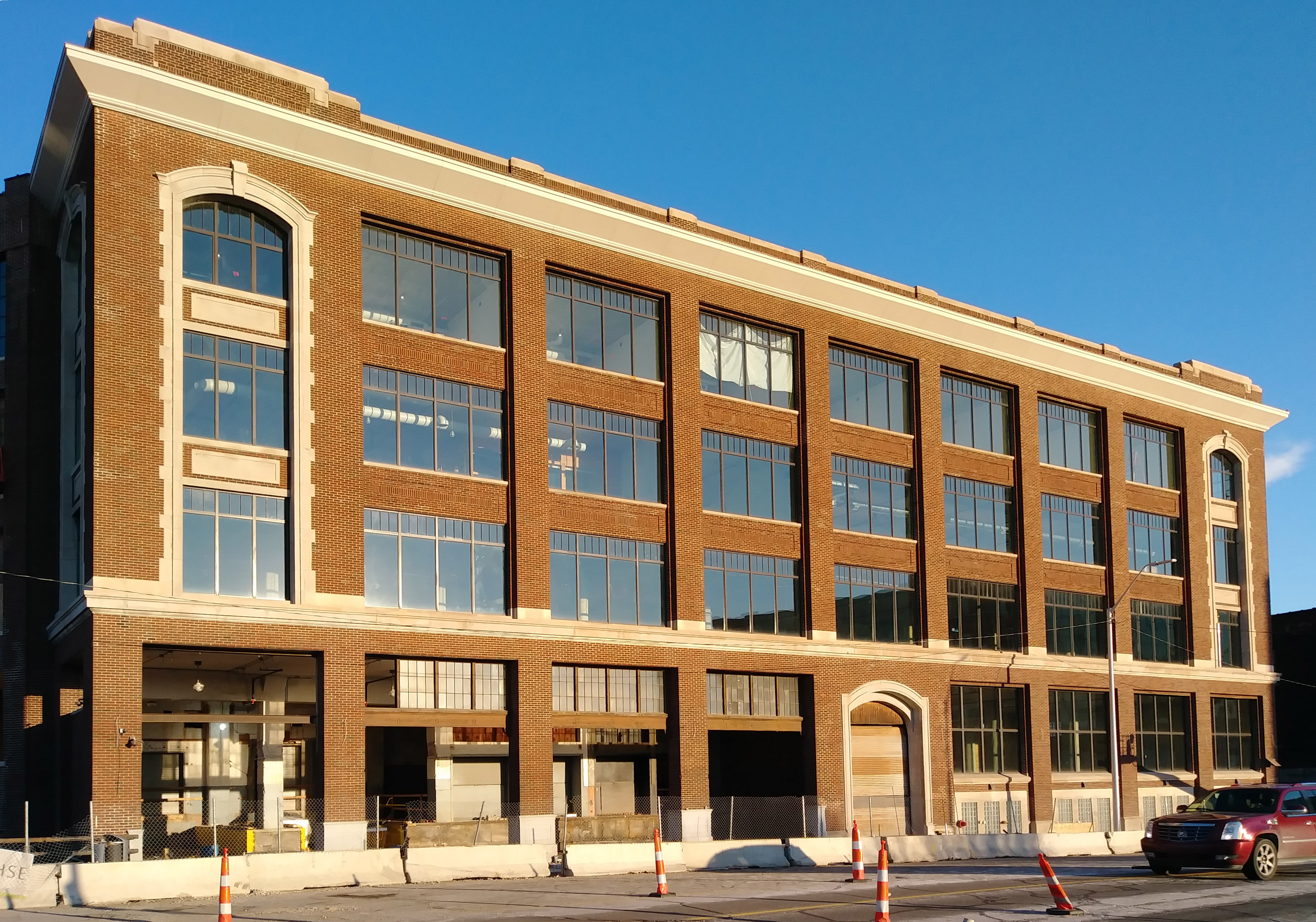
- Warehouse, 2017

- Location within Michigan Location within the United States
- Interactive map
- Location: 1702 W Fort St. Detroit, Michigan
- Coordinates: 42.3235°N 83.0650°W
- Built: 1913
- Built by: Bryant & Detwiler Company
- Architect: Smith, Hinchman & Grylls
- Architectural style: Commercial Style, Neoclassical
- NRHP reference No.: 100001839
- Added to NRHP: November 27, 2017

The Assembly (aka Corktown Lofts), previously known as the Edson, Moore and Company Building, is a former warehouse building, constructed for Edson, Moore & Company in 1913. It is located at 1700 West Fort Street in Detroit, Michigan, and has been redeveloped into a mixed use space. The building was listed on the National Register of Historic Places in 2017.

== History ==
Edson, Moore & Company was founded in 1872 and quickly became one of the largest dry goods wholesale businesses in Michigan. The firm employed a number of travelling salesmen, and by the turn of the century it was one of the largest wholesale jobbers in the Midwest. The increase in sales necessitated new headquarters: the company's first location was at the southwest corner of Bates Street and East Jefferson Avenue, but in 1882 the company moved to the newly constructed Palms Building across the street. A disastrous fire in 1893 leveled the building, but the firm rebuilt at the same location.

By the early 1910s, Edson, Moore and Company desperately needed more warehouse space, but there was no room remaining in the built-up downtown wholesale district. They turned to the western riverfront district, at that time being newly developed. The firm hired the development company owned by John F. and Horace E. Dodge to construct this warehouse building. In 1913, the Dodges hired Detroit-based Smith, Hinchman & Grylls to design the warehouse building, and contracted Bryant & Detwiler Company to construct it at a cost of $237,000.

Over subsequent years, Edson, Moore & Company's business evolved, from clothing to textiles and carpeting. The firm moved out of the Fort Street building in 1958 into a larger facility on West Chicago Boulevard. The firm lasted until 1974. In 1959, Edson, Moore & Company sold the Fort Street warehouse. In the 1970s the building was owned by the Charles Sabadash Company, and was used to rent warehouse space for storage. In the 1990s, the building was used by the Olde Discount brokerage for storage, and in 2004, Display Group, a design, fixtures and trade show kiosk company, purchased the building and moved in.

In 2016, the building was purchased by Bedrock Real Estate, the real estate development division of Quicken Loans to redevelop into a mixed-use space. Bedrock invested $39 million in the property, and the refurbished space opened in 2019.

== Description ==
The Corktown Lofts is a four-story Neoclassical warehouse building constructed of reinforced concrete and faced with dark reddish brown brick. The building is trapezoidal, filling the lot and abutting the former railroad tracks, laid diagonally to Fort Street, to the west. Additional levels below grade are exposed along the railroad track. The main facade, facing Fort Street, contains nine vertical bays. The seven center bays contain window openings with four vertical panes and a horizontal transom above. The window bays on each end contain the same windows, but with cast stone quoined surrounds on the upper levels and an arched window at the very top. There is a central entrance, deeply recessed, on the ground floor. A stone string course separates the upper floors from the lower.

On the west facade, the decorative cast stone quoined surround and string course wraps around to ornament the first bay. The remaining bays are simplified in form, separated by vertical piers.

After renovations, the building contains 32 apartments ranging from 750 to 2000 square feet and containing one, two, or three bedrooms. The building also has nearly 80,000 square feet of office space and 7,814 square feet of ground-floor retail.

== Gallery ==
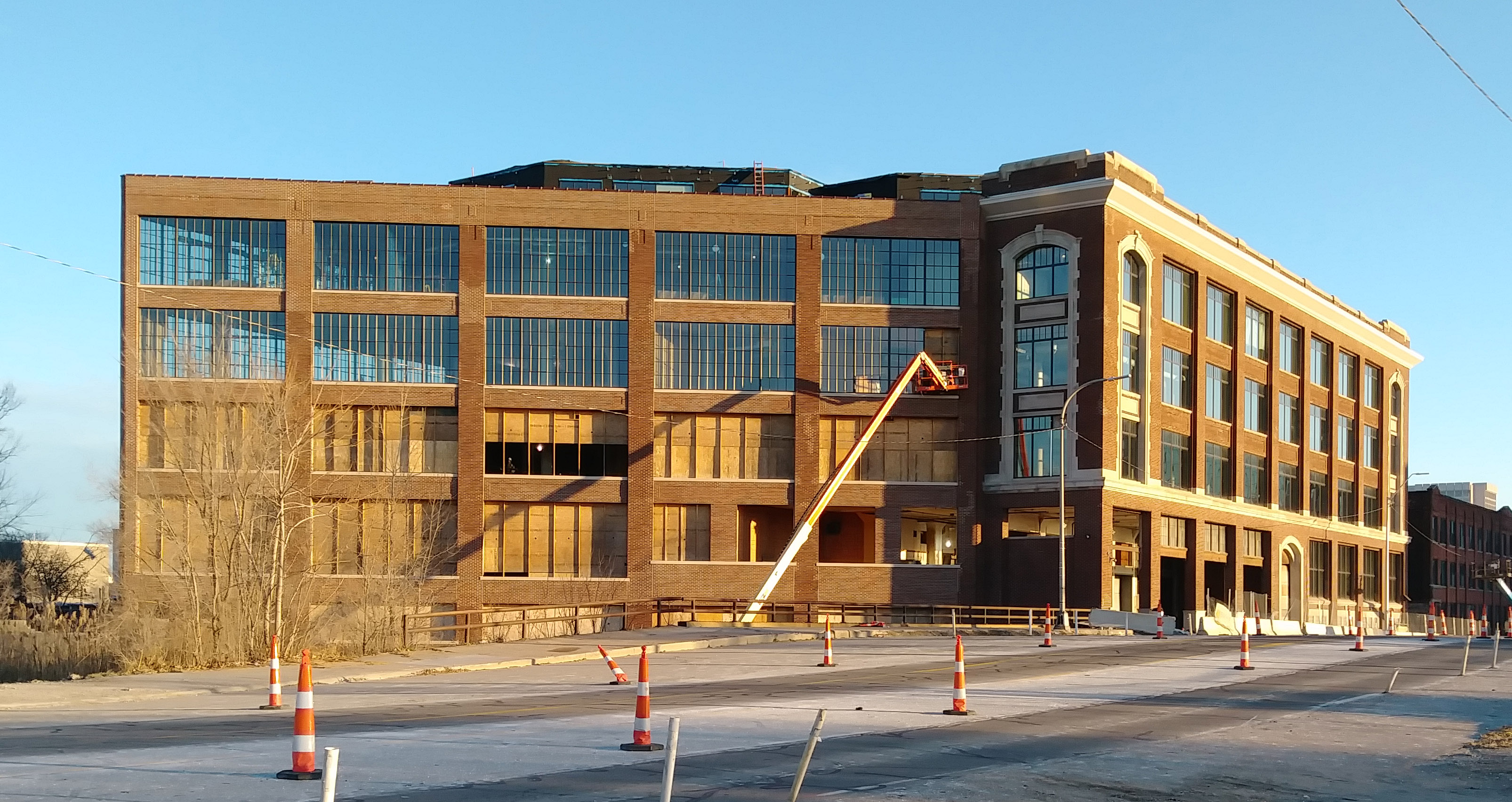
Side view of warehouse, 2017
