= Rehab Addict =

American TV show

- Presented by: Nicole Curtis
- No. of seasons: 9
- No. of episodes: 87

Production
- Running time: 22 Minutes

Original release
- Network: DIY; HGTV
- Release: October 14, 2010 – July 15, 2025

Rehab Addict is a television show documenting home renovations, which aired on DIY and HGTV. Rehab Addict debuted on the DIY network on October 14, 2010. Beginning in January 2014, Season 4, was moved to airing on HGTV's prime time schedule. The fifth season premiered on June 24, 2025. The show was canceled in 2026 after the host Nicole Curtis was caught on video using a racial slur.

== Host ==
Nicole Curtis (b. August 20, 1976) advocates for the preservation and restoration of existing architecture over demolition when feasible. She has rehabbed homes in Saint Paul, Minnesota; Minneapolis, Minnesota; Lake Orion, Michigan; Detroit, Michigan; and Akron, Ohio. Her work centers on pre-World War II homes, and her renovation philosophy is to "restore old homes to their former glory" rather than modernization.

Curtis grew up in Lake Orion, Michigan and graduated from Lake Orion High School in 1994. Her family owned a garbage business. She attended college in Georgia, Florida, and Michigan and had her son, Ethan, before she graduated. As of September 2014 she lives in a renovated 1904 home in Detroit. Curtis originally intended to study law in college but later switched to education.

Curtis announced in July 2015 that she was expecting her second child and later that year gave birth to a son, Harper.

== Cancellation ==
On February 11, 2026, HGTV announced that Curtis had been fired from the network, and that the new episodes of Rehab Addict that were due to begin airing that day had been pulled. Curtis' firing came after a video was released showing her exclaiming "fart nigger" while filming a scene for an episode that aired in 2025. That same day, Curtis went on to issue an apology, stating that "the word in question is wrong and not part of my vocabulary and never has been." The show was canceled by HGTV and removed from the HBO Max and Discovery+ streaming services.

== Seasons ==
Season	Episodes		Originally released		Projects
Season	Episodes		First released	Last released	Projects
1	13		October 14, 2010	March 17, 2011	Lyndale House (1908 – Minneapolis, MN); Minnehaha House (1916 – Minneapolis, MN)
2	13		March 1, 2012	May 17, 2012	Various projects, including Fremont House (1920 – Minneapolis, MN) and Harriet Project (1890 – Minneapolis, MN)
3	13		January 10, 2013	April 11, 2013	Dollar House (1911 – Minneapolis, MN); Case Ave House (1889 – Saint Paul, MN)
4	17		October 17, 2013	January 30, 2014	4th Street Project (1883 – Minneapolis, MN); Campbell St. Project (1929 – Detroit, MI); 25th Street Project (1923 – Minneapolis, MN)
5	14		October 14, 2014	January 1, 2015	Summit Mansion (1904 – Saint Paul, MN); Akron House (1908 – Akron, OH), with the LeBron James Family Foundation
6	13		January 8, 2015	May 7, 2015	Auction House (1913 – Detroit, MI)
6S	8		November 5, 2015	November 26, 2015	Ransom Gillis House (1876 – Detroit, MI) (project sponsored by Quicken Loans)
7	14		February 3, 2016	May 4, 2016	Grandpa's House (c. 1956 – Metro Detroit, MI)
8	16	8	October 4, 2017	November 22, 2017	14 Mile House (1928 – Detroit, MI)
8	16	8	July 11, 2018	August 29, 2018	Lake Orion House (Lake Orion, MI)

== Spin-off ==
Rehab Addict Rescue premiered on January 28, 2021. The series only ran for one season.
