= Henry T. Brush =

American architect (1849–1879)

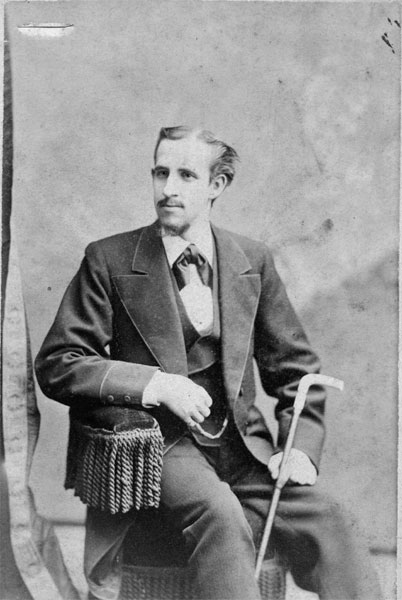
Henry T. Brush

Jeanie F. Brush (née Campbell)

Henry T. Brush (August 9, 1849 – July 15, 1879) was an American architect who practiced in Detroit, Michigan in the latter part of the 19th century. Brush was born in Detroit, the son of Amanda Brush. Henry's father was from Canada and died by the time he was 11. Amanda remarried William Cicero Grant, who was instrumental in the early education of Henry and his older brother James. William was a mathematical instrument maker.

== Education and career ==
Henry started working in 1868 at the age of 18 as an architect/draughtsman in Detroit. In 1872, Henry obtained a job at the Detroit architect office of J.V. Smith & Co. The next year, he moved to the firm of Porter & Watkins for a short time before he and Hugh Smith formed their own company. In the second half of 1875, Hugh and Henry split and formed separate firms. George D. Mason originally started his architectural career with Smith’s new firm in an effort to learn to design cornices from him, but that only lasted a summer. By fall, Mason had moved to Henry’s firm as he thought opportunities were better there. Henry’s firm must have initially struggled, either from the split with Smith, or the ongoing economic depression, seeing that Mason worked for nine months there without pay. In 1878, Mason left Henry's firm. That same year, Henry formed a new partnership with John M. Donaldson. Brush and Donaldson remained partners until Henry's death in 1879.

== Family life and death ==
In 1872, Henry married Jeanie Flora Campbell. In 1874, their first and only child, Annie Frances, was born. Jeanie soon succumbed to complications of the birth, dying on September 18, 1874. In 1876, Henry married Charlotte M. Grosvernor. The next year, their first and only child, Frederick F. Brush, was born.

During the late 1870s, Henry suffered from chronic bouts of depression due to the loss of his first wife, Jeanie, and business failures due to the economic upheavals in the country resulting from the Panic of 1873. On July 15, 1879, at about 2 o'clock in the afternoon, after lunch with his family, he proceeded up to his workroom in his house on 157 Wayne Street in downtown Detroit. A while later his wife checked on him and he seemed fine consulting some books and working on some drawings. Upon her leaving, Henry removed two revolvers from the desk drawer and slowly positioned himself on the floor of his workroom. He placed the two revolvers in his mouth, one belonging to himself and one to Charlotte's father, and discharged them both simultaneously.

Charlotte married Henry's last business partner John M. Donaldson in 1882 and the two raised Fredrick as well as two children of their own, Alexander and Bruce. Annie Frances, the daughter from Henry's first marriage to Jeanie Flora Campbell, was raised by the Campbell family in Orchard Lake, Michigan.

== Selected commissions ==
All buildings are located in Detroit, unless otherwise indicated.

- (1871) Moffat Building, 655 Griswold, demolished in 1928 for the Penobscot Building.
- (1872) Residence of Mrs. Caroline Eaton, 5201 Woodward, demolished in 1921 for the Detroit Public Library.
- (1873) Methodist Church of Canada, located on East Park near Queen, Chatham, Ont., Canada.
- (1874) Orchard Lake Chapel, Orchard Lake, Michigan.
- (1874) Twenty-first Street Public School..
- (1874) Residence of Hon. Henry Heames, corner of Fort and 22nd, Demolished in 1920s.
- (1874) Residence of E.G. Allan, 57 E High St, Demolished in 1920s.
- (1874) Central Hall (with Hugh Smith), Hillsdale College, Hillsdale, Michigan.
- (1875–77) Detroit Public Library (with Hugh Smith) – demolished, replaced by Downtown Library in 1932.
- (1875) Williamston School House (with Hugh Smith), Williamston, Michigan (1875) – burned, 1887.
- (1875) Residence of Wilhelm Boeing, 5513 Woodward (1875) demolished in 1935 for the widening of Woodward.
- (1875) Residence of Alfred F Wilcox (with Hugh Smith) 261 Edmund Place.
- (1876–78) Ransom Gillis House (with George D. Mason) 203 Alfred Street.
- (1876) Clement Lafferty House, 1960 West Fort Street, demolished in 1920.
- (1876) Woman's Hospital and Foundlings' Home.
- (1876) Residence of S.B. Dixon, 271 E Forest Avenue, demolished.
- (1876) Residence of L.L. Farnsworth, 5116 Woodward, Destroyed by fire 1886.
- (1876) George O. Robinson House (with Hugh Smith), 2911 Cass Avenue corner with Ledyard – demolished during WWII.
- (1876) Residence of Hon. T. W. Palmer, corner of Woodward and Farnsworth (Interior Alterations) demolished in 1905.
- (1877) Residence of Wm. McGrath,110 W Forest Avenue.
- (1877) Shaarey Zedek Synagogue, 602 East Congress, corner with St Antoine, Demolished in 1920s.
- (1879) Residence of Wm. J. Fowler, 3153 Cass Avenue, was transformed into a commercial building in the 1910s.
- (1879) Residence of A.H. Muir, 1959 W Jefferson Avenue, demolished in 1929.
- David Ward House, West Bloomfield Township, Michigan – demolished.
- Ypsilanti High School, Ypsilanti, Michigan.
- Seventh-Day Adventists' Tabernacle, Battle Creek, Michigan.
- Public School Windsor, Ont., Canada.
- Shaarey Zedek Synagogue, at Antoine and Congress Streets.
- Residence of A.H. West, Petite Cote, Ont., Canada.
- Residence of W.H. Burk, Petite Cote, Ont., Canada.
- Residence of J.J. Berger, corner of Russell and Congress Streets.
- Residence of C.C. Hickey, Warren Avenue.
- Residence of Mrs. Willson, corner of High and Clifford Streets.
- Public School building, Franklin, Pennsylvania.
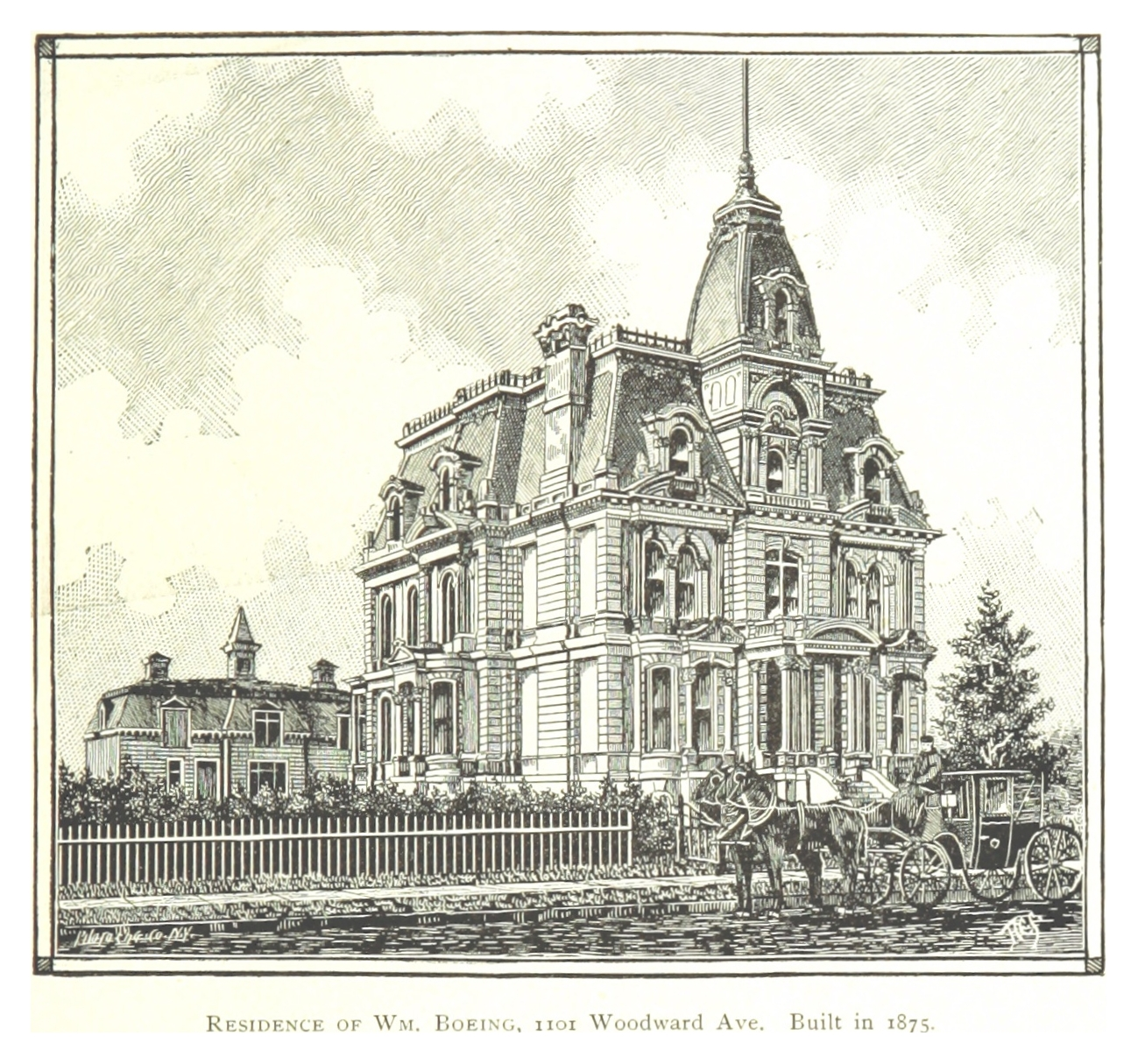
  Residence of Wilheim Boeing built in 1875 and demolished in 1935.
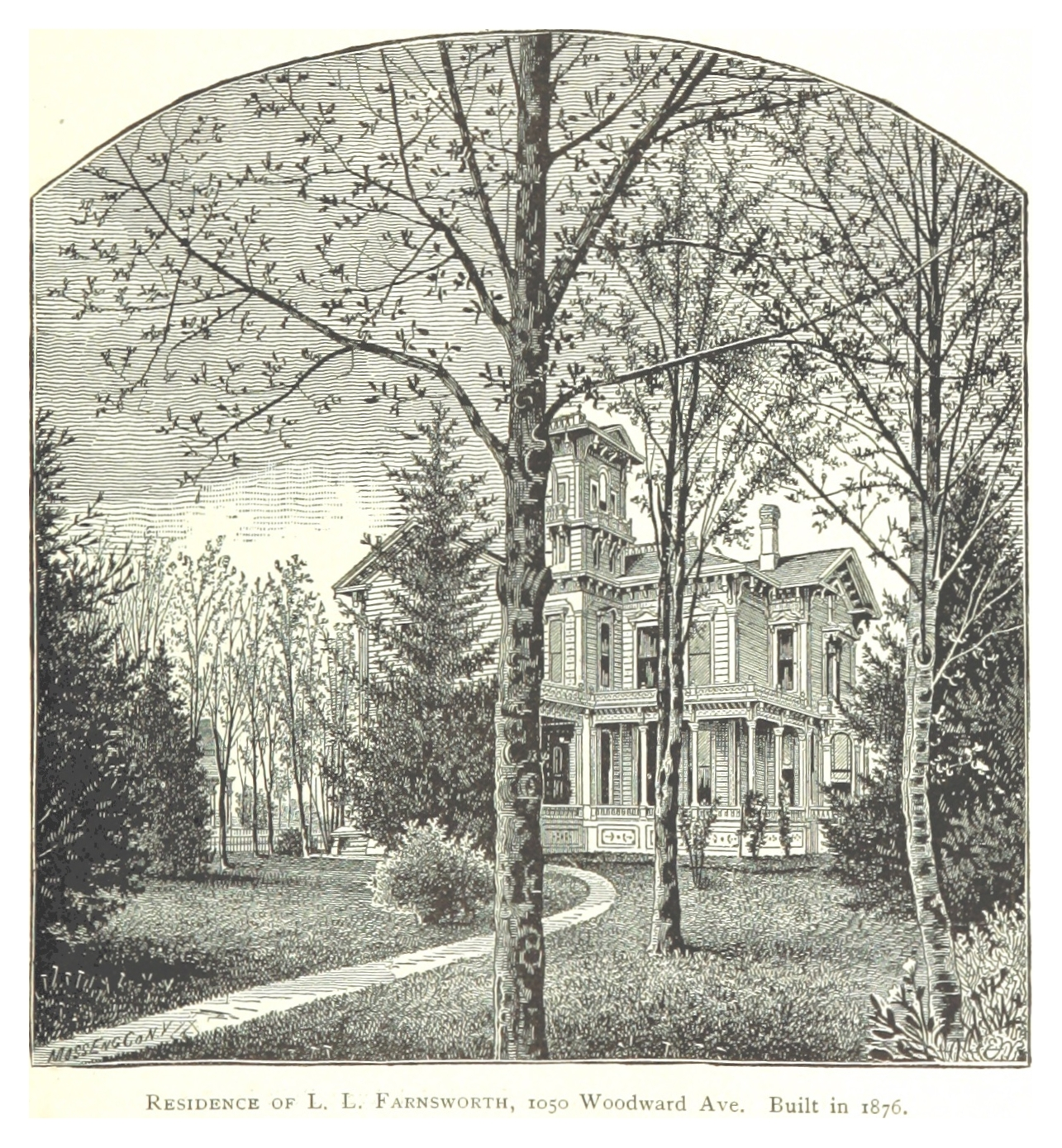
  Residence of L.L Farnsworth built 1876 and demolished in 1886.
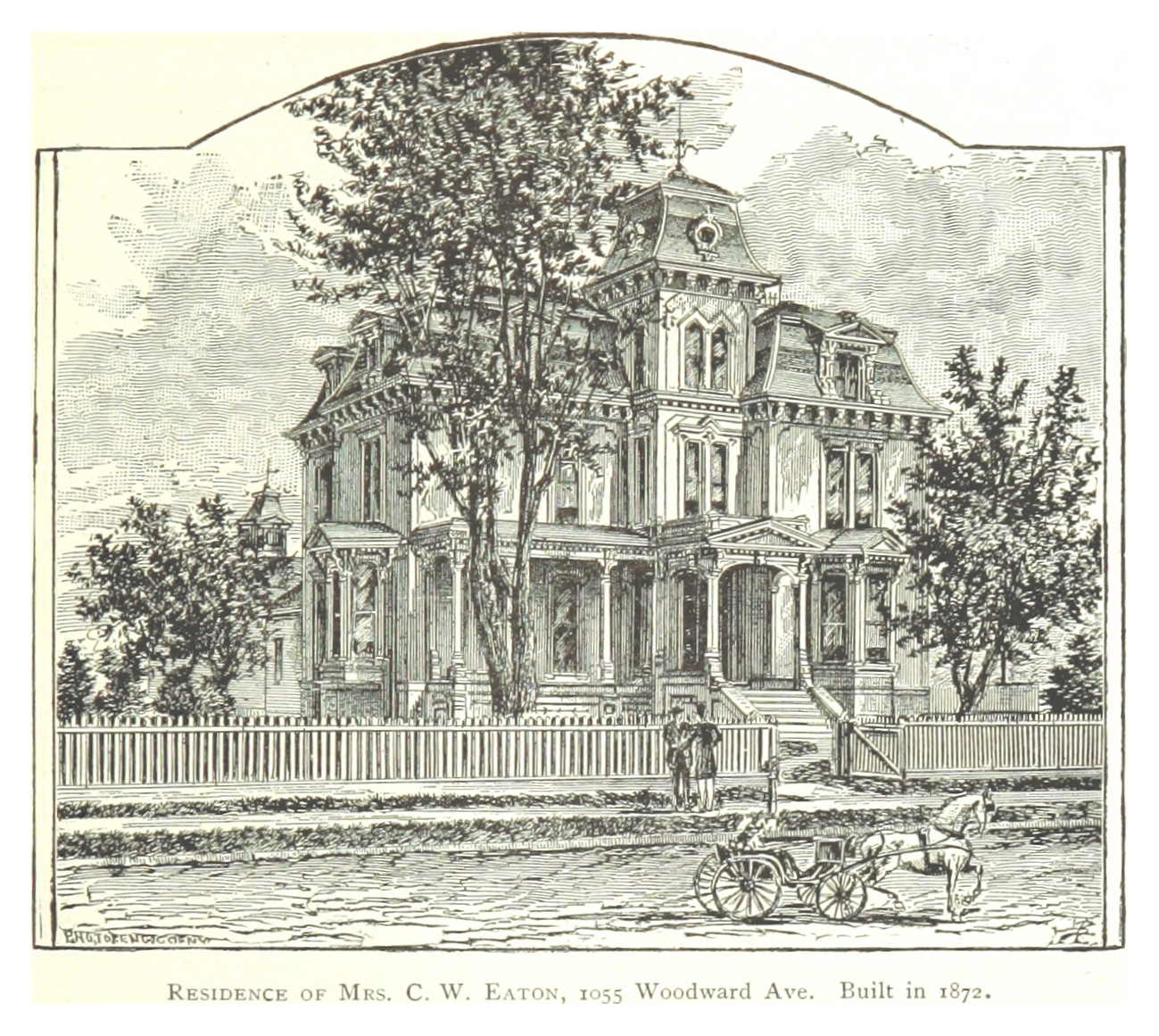
  Caroline W Eaton residence built in 1872 and demolished in 1920.
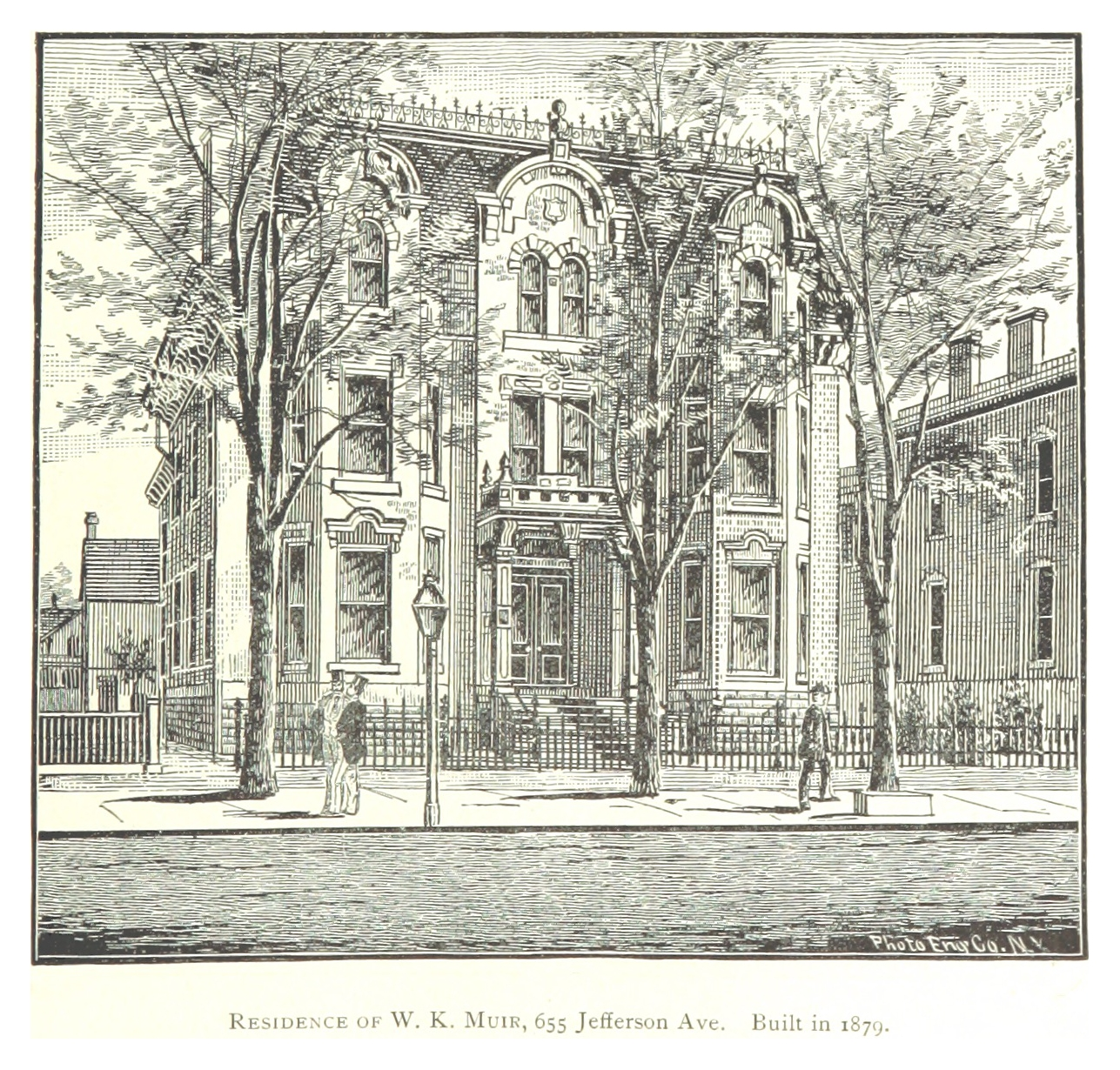
  William K Muir residence, built in 1879 and demolished in 1929.
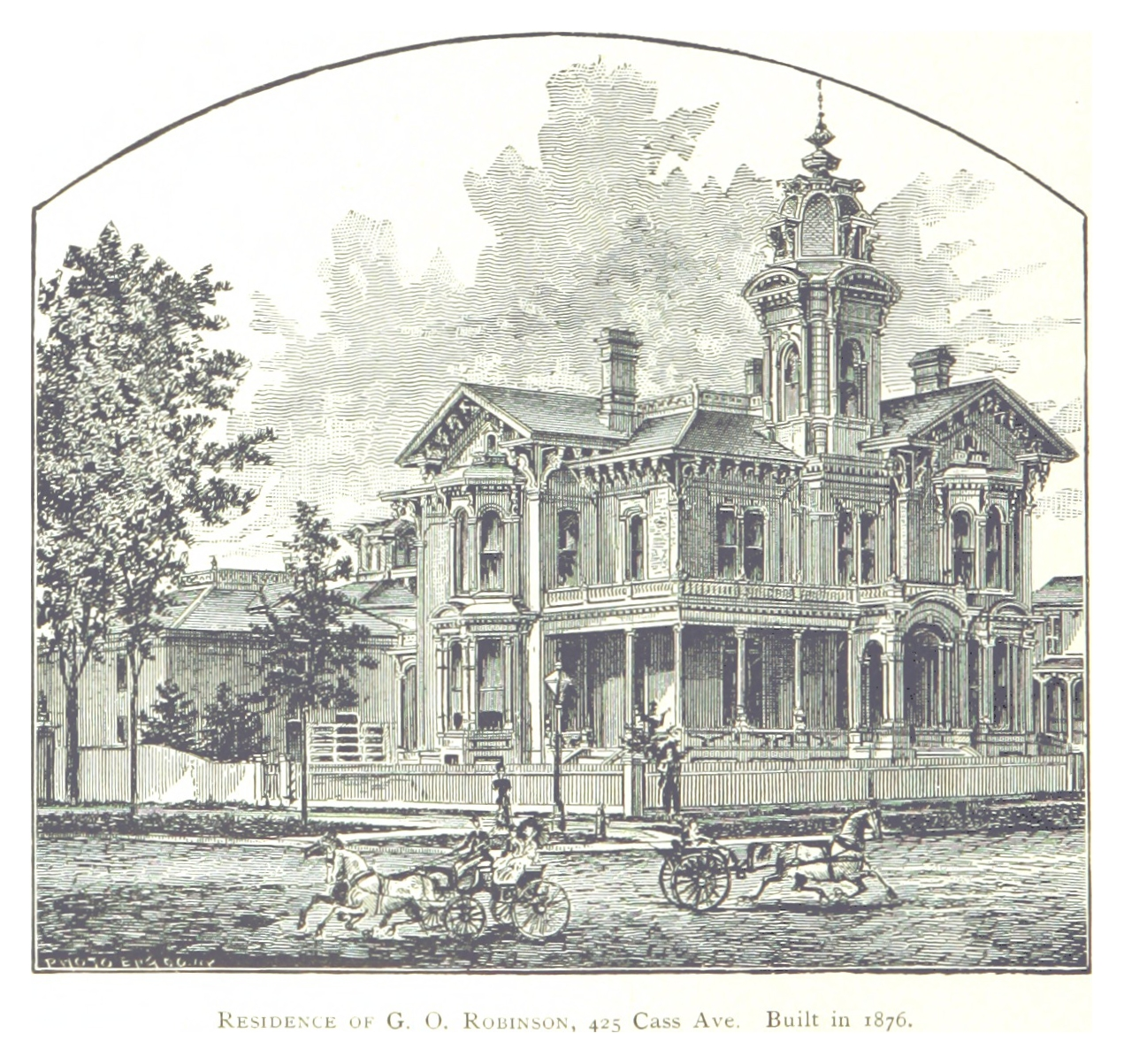
  Residence of George O Robinson built in 1876 and demolished in 1940s.
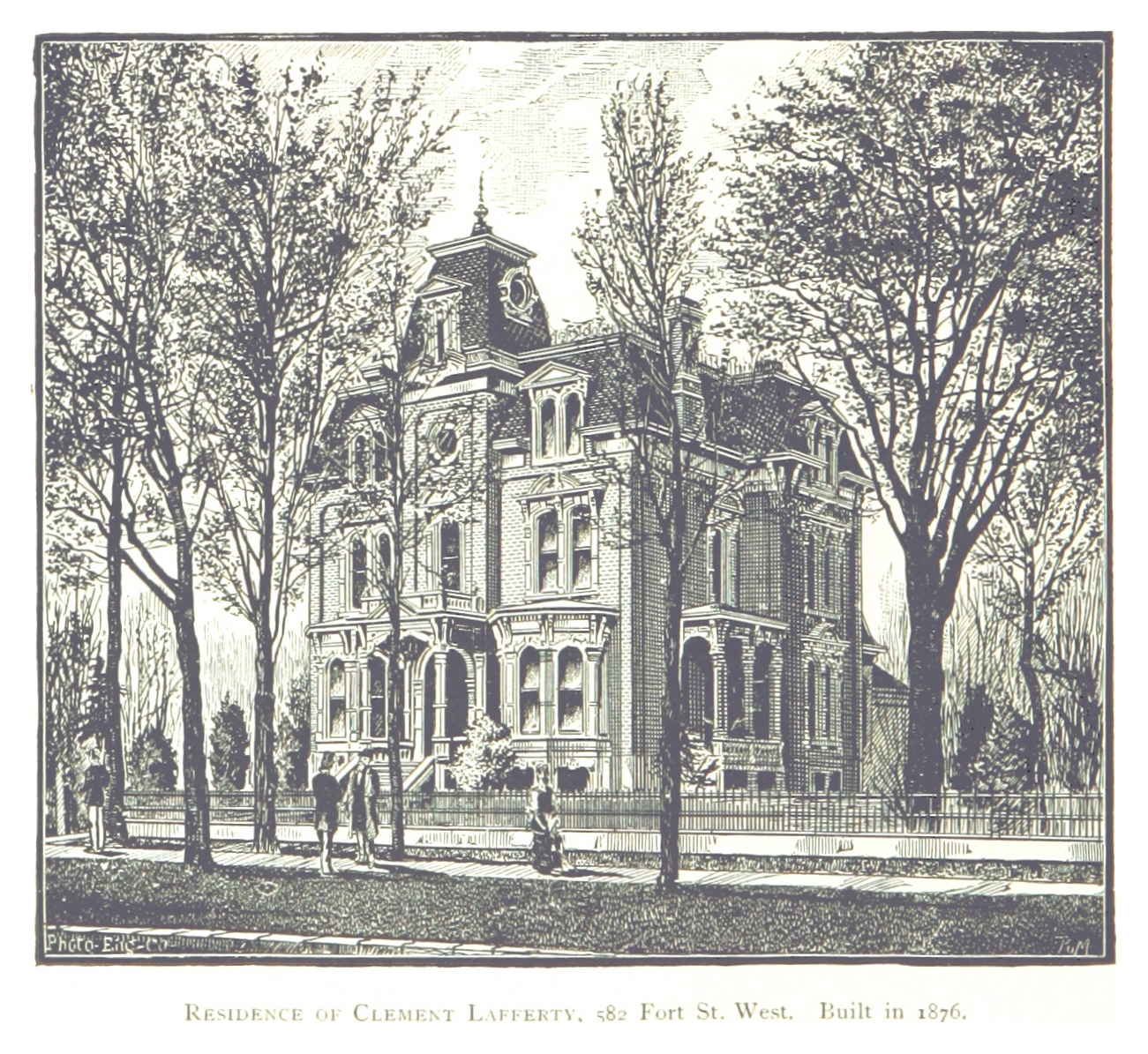
  Clement Lafferty House built in 1876 and demolished in 1920.
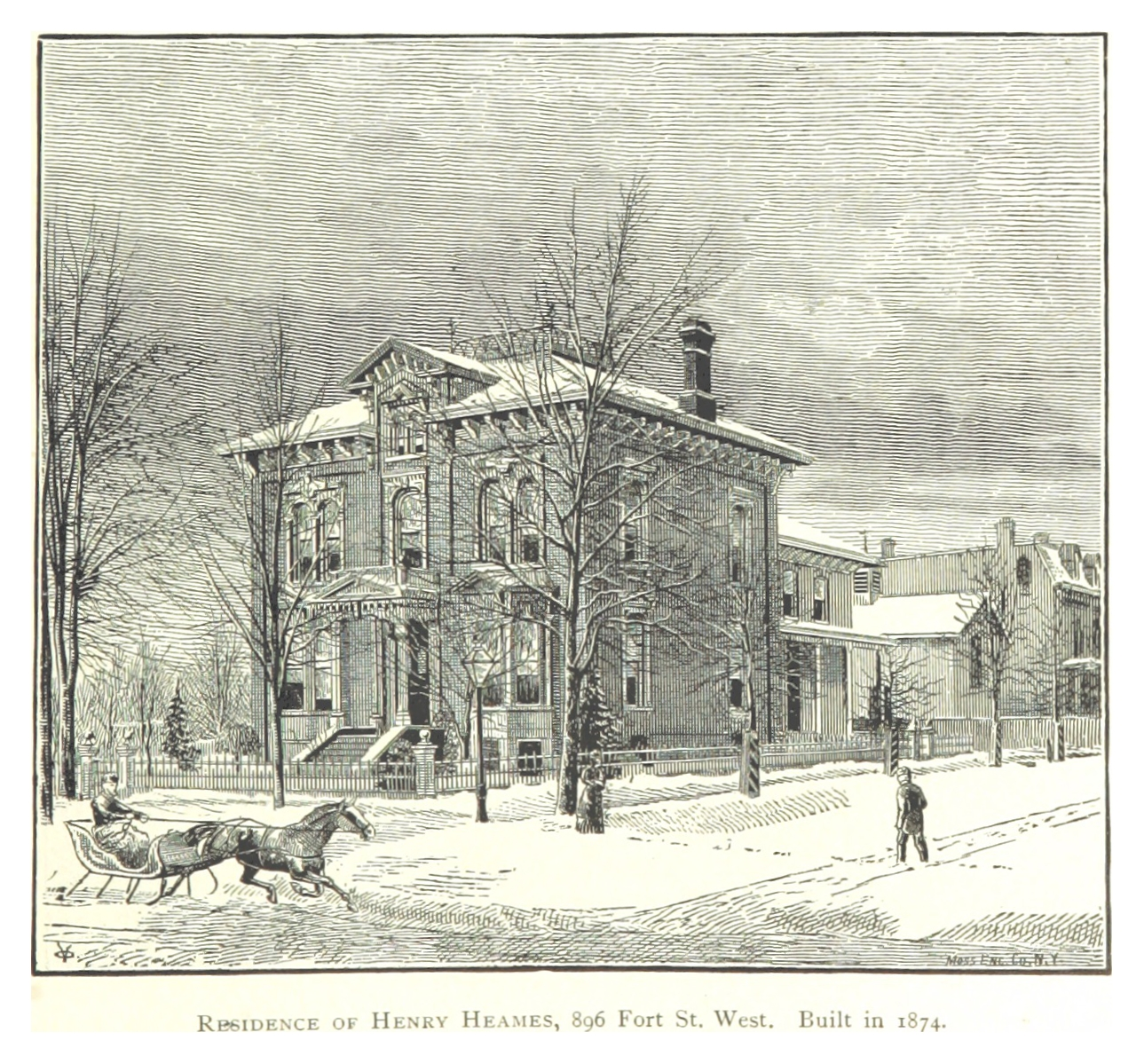
  Henry Heames House built in 1874 and demolished in 1920s.
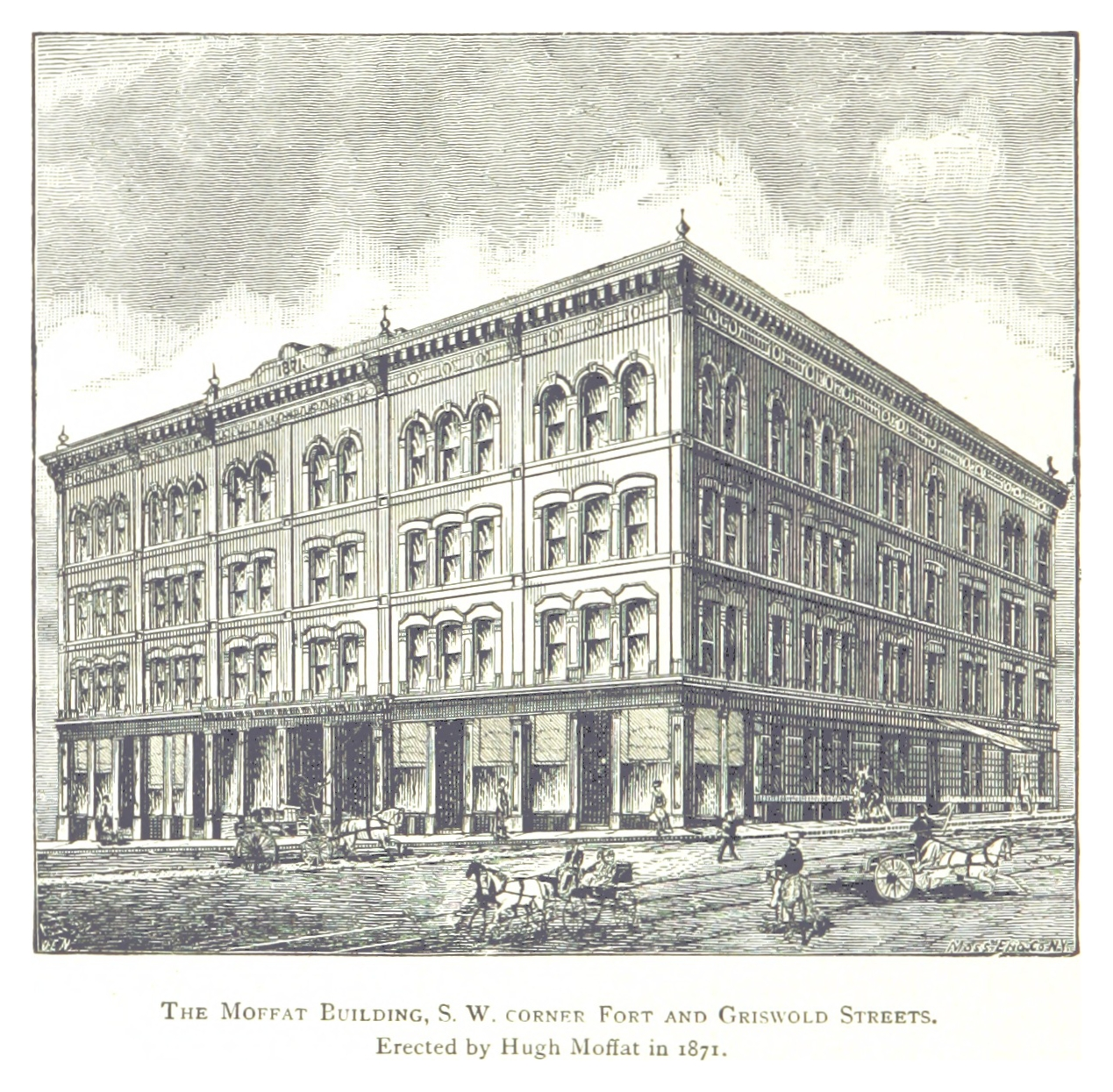
  Moffat Building built in 1872 was the first building with elevator in Detroit.
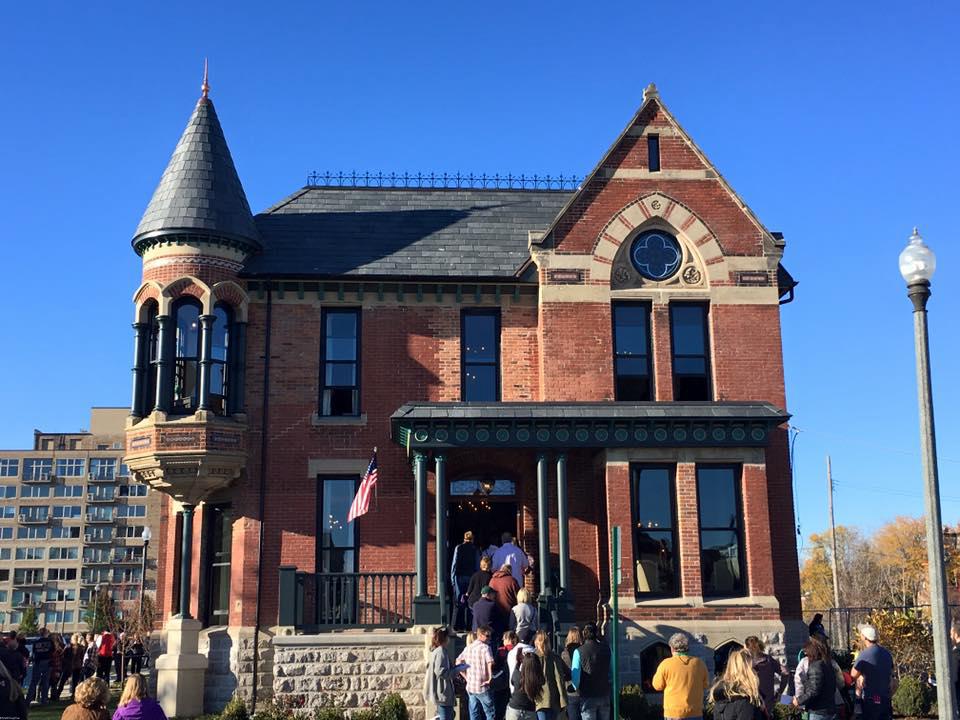
  Ransom Gillis House built in 1878 in the corner or Alfred Street and John R Street
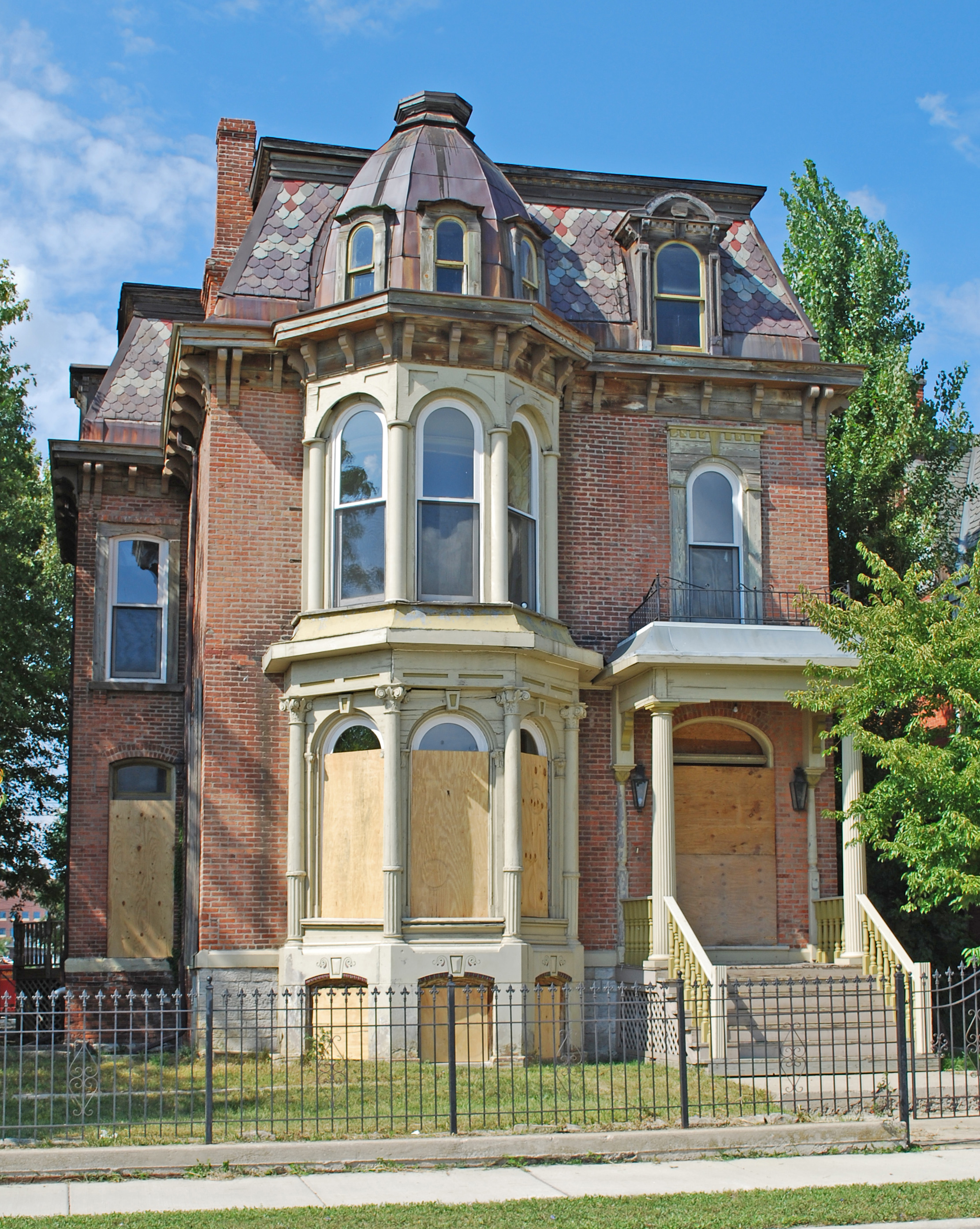
  Residence of Alfred F Wilcox built in 1875.
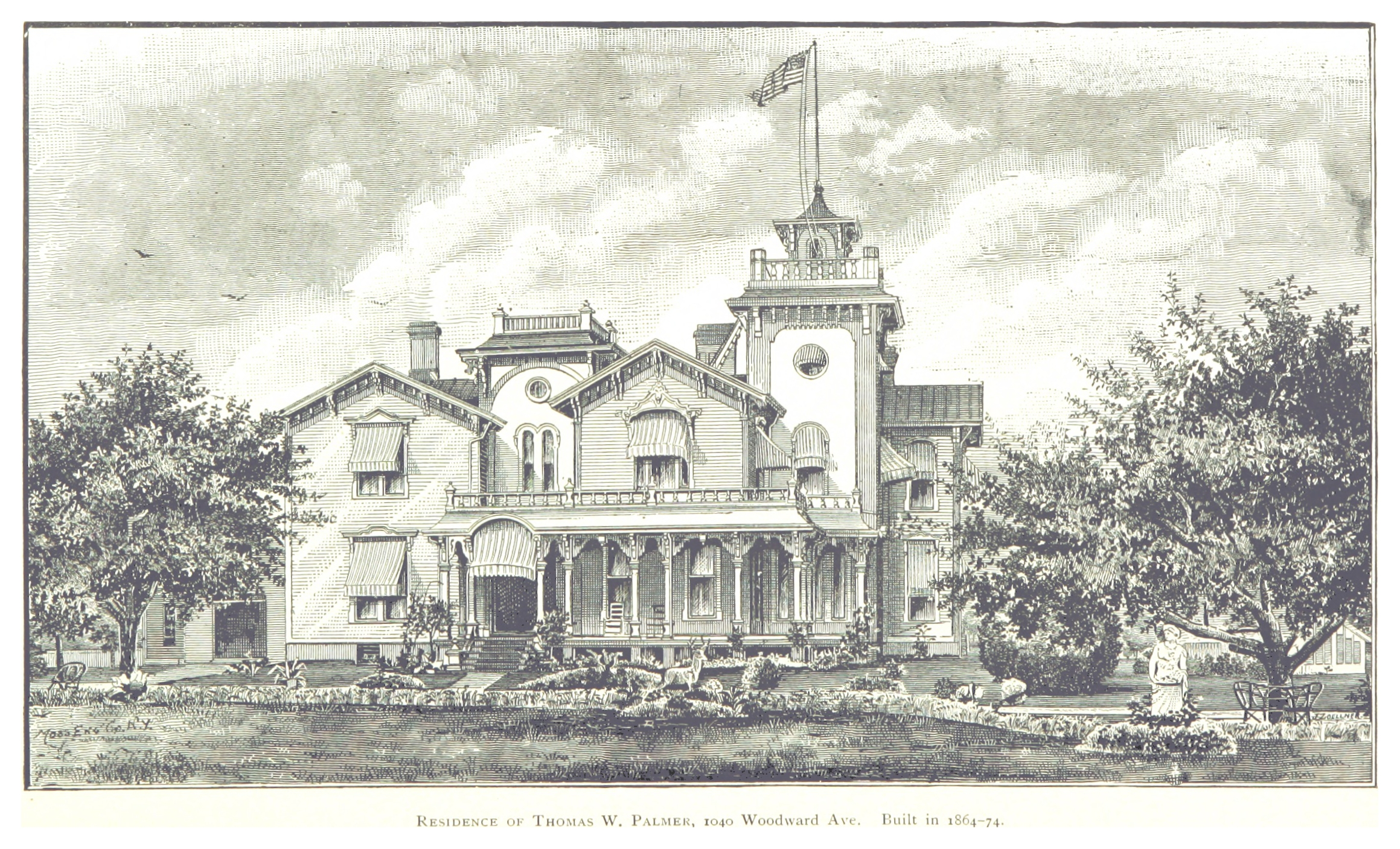
  Thomas W Palmer residence built in 1864 and demolished in 1905
