= Detroit People Mover =

Public transport line in Michigan, US

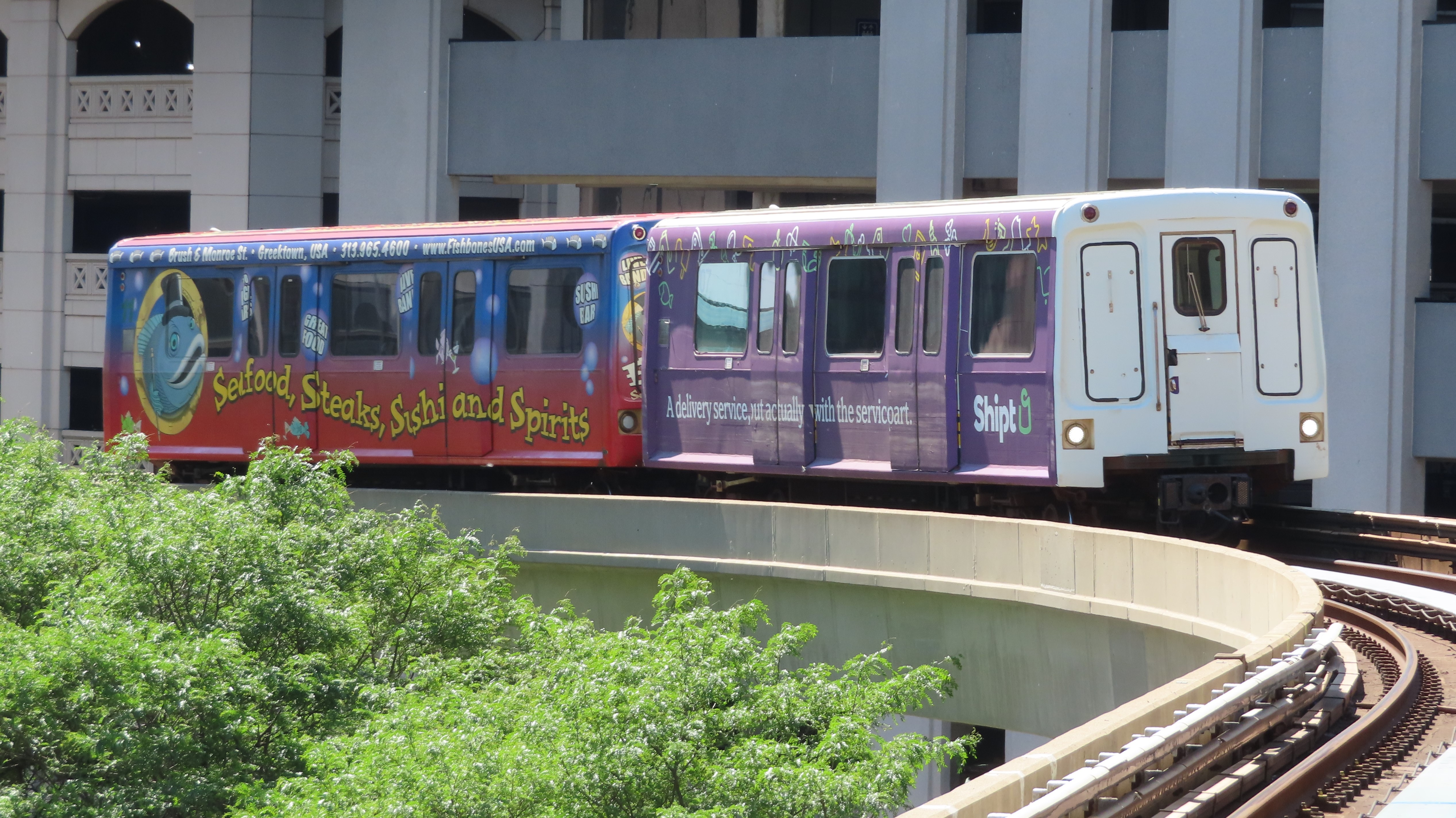
- A Detroit People Mover train approaching Millender Center station

Overview
- Owner: Detroit Transportation Corporation
- Locale: Downtown Detroit
- Transit type: Automated people mover
- Number of stations: 13
- Daily ridership: 1,900 (weekdays, Q2 2026)
- Annual ridership: 1,323,500 (2025)
- Chief executive: Melia Howard, General Manager; Robert Cramer, Chair, Board of Directors
- Headquarters: 500 Griswold Street, Suite 2900, Detroit
- Website: thepeoplemover.com

Operation
- Began operation: July 31, 1987
- Operator: Detroit Transportation Corporation
- Character: Elevated
- Rolling stock: UTDC ICTS Mark I
- Number of vehicles: 11

Technical
- System length: 2.94 mi (4.73 km)
- No. of tracks: 1
- Track gauge: 4 ft 8 1/2 in (1,435 mm) standard gauge
- Electrification: Third rail, linear induction motor
- Top speed: 56 mph (90 km/h)
System map
Detroit People Mover highlighted in blue

The Detroit People Mover (DPM) is a 2.94-mile (4.73 km) elevated automated people mover system in Detroit, Michigan, United States. The system operates in a one-way loop on a single track encircling downtown Detroit, using Intermediate Capacity Transit System linear induction motor technology developed by the Urban Transportation Development Corporation. In 2025, the system had a ridership of 1,323,500, or about 1,900 per weekday as of the second quarter of 2026.

The People Mover is supplemented by the QLINE streetcar, which connects downtown with Midtown, New Center, and the Detroit Amtrak station. The system also connects to local buses operated by DDOT and SMART, and the D2A2 and DAX commuter buses, as part of a comprehensive network of transportation in metropolitan Detroit.

== History ==
=== Background ===
In 1964 the creation of the federal Urban Mass Transportation Administration (UMTA) allowed stronger investment into cities' declining transit systems. By the late 1960s there was gaining momentum for exploring new forms of transit to improve the quality of urban life, and UMTA's scope was expanded for development of such systems. In the early 1970s two automated guideway transit (AGT) demonstrators were sponsored; a "group rapid transit" concept, the Vought Airtrans, at Dallas Fort Worth International Airport; and a "personal rapid transit" concept, Morgantown Personal Rapid Transit, at the West Virginia University. Additionally, four companies would receive grants to develop automated systems to be demonstrated at Transpo '72. While these AGT systems ended up being popular with zoos, airports, and abroad, they failed to attract popularity among municipalities and planning organizations.

=== Planning ===
In the early 1970s pressure was mounting for a high-capacity rapid transit network for Detroit. In early 1972 Southeastern Michigan Transportation Authority (SEMTA) and Southeast Michigan Council of Governments (SEMCOG) commenced a study of such a network. During the study, it became apparent that automated people movers were useful in complimenting transit services, recommending systems for Downtown, Medical Center & Wayne State, Fairlane Town Center, Southfield, and Metro Airport.

In 1975, following the failure to produce any large-scale development from the AGT program and increased pressure to show results, UMTA created the Downtown People Mover Program (DPM) and sponsored a nationwide competition that offered federal funds to cover much of the cost of planning and construction of such a system. UMTA reviewed thirty-five full proposals. From these, they selected proposals from Cleveland, Houston, Los Angeles, and St. Paul. In addition, UMTA decided they would approve proposals from Baltimore, Detroit, and Miami to develop People Mover systems if they could do so with existing grant commitments. Of the seven cities with UMTA approval for their People Mover proposals, only Detroit and Miami persevered to build and operate systems.

The Ford Motor Company was involved in one of the designs of the People Mover and had hired AlScott Service Company to design and build a room size working model of the system. This model was used for Ford's proposals in their attempt to build the system. Ford previously developed the ACT, a rubber-tired monorail, which was exhibited at Transpo '72; a production version of the system ran at Fairlane Town Center in nearby Dearborn from 1976 to 1988.

The People Mover was intended to be the downtown distributor for a proposed city and metro-wide light rail transit system for Detroit in the early 1980s; however, funding was scaled back. President Gerald Ford had promised $600 million in federal funds. Plans included a subway line along Woodward Avenue that would turn into a street level train at McNichols and eventually go all the way to Pontiac, with additional rail lines running along Gratiot and a commuter line between Detroit and Port Huron. Inability of local leaders to come to an agreement led to the $600 million commitment being withdrawn by the Reagan administration, though plans for the People Mover still moved forward. At the time of planning, the system was projected to have a ridership of 67,700 daily.

During construction, the system was initially owned by the Southeastern Michigan Transportation Authority (SEMTA). It was acquired by the Detroit Transportation Corporation (DTC) on October 4, 1985. DTC was incorporated in 1985 as a Michigan Public Body Corporate for the purpose of acquiring, owning, constructing, furnishing, equipping, completing, operating, improving, enlarging, and/or disposing of the Central Automated Transit Systems (CATS). DTC was created by the City of Detroit, Michigan pursuant to Act 7 of Public Acts of 1967 and is a component unit of the City of Detroit and accounts its activity as per proprietary funds.

=== Opening ===
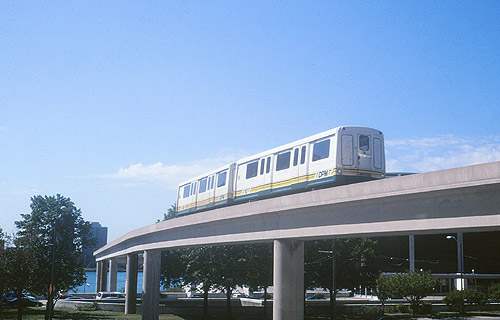
Detroit People Mover cars in original livery, 2003

The Downtown People Mover opened on July 31, 1987. A dedication ceremony was held at the Financial District station, with appearances by Mayor Coleman Young and People Mover supporter Max Fisher. After opening speeches and awards, Young and Fisher cut a five-foot-long cake shaped like a People Mover car, and boarded the inaugural run. The train broke through a green ribbon accompanied by the simultaneous release of 10,000 balloons, also shaped like a People Mover car. A block party was hosted below on Larned Street, and the service was open to the public by 1:30 pm.

Trains reportedly ran at crush load for the entire opening weekend, with passengers waiting around 20 minutes to board at some stations. Transit officials controlled crowds, encouraging only taking one round-trip to let others ride. The system carried an estimated 2,000 passengers per hour on Friday and Saturday. Rides were free for the first week, with a $0.50 fare going into effect on August 8.

In the first year, an average of 11,000 riders used the People Mover each day; the one-day record was 54,648. Originally, the People Mover System was operated and maintained by UTDC on a month-to-month basis; DTC took over operations and maintenance on November 18, 1988.

=== Service disruptions from construction ===
On October 24, 1998, the implosion of the J. L. Hudson Department Store damaged part of the nearby People Mover track and forced the system to shut down. Limited service resumed on January 23, 1999 with the system split into two lines: a "red line" running between Times Square & Millender Center, and a "green line" between Greektown and Cobo Center. Both lines were shortened by one stop in August of that year. In November 1999, the loop was restored, and Times Square station reopened.

However, Grand Circus Park and Greektown remained closed to accommodate construction of Greektown Casino and the closure of the David Whitney Building. Greektown station reopened in January 2000, following the casino's completion. In April 2001, Grand Circus Park reopened, restoring service to whole system.

During construction of Compuware World Headquarters, the Cadillac Center station was temporarily closed as part of the parking structure was built around it. The station remained largely untouched and unmodified, although the entrance was slightly expanded, and a walkway to the garage was added.

In 2002, the original Renaissance Center station was closed and demolished. This was part of a multi-year renovation of the Renaissance Center, in which concrete berms in front of the complex were removed to make it more inviting to the rest of downtown. The system ran limited service due to the gap in the track during construction, leading to a drop in ridership, before the new station and track opened on September 3, 2004. The original station's tile artwork was destroyed in the demolition, though its creator, George Woodman, designed a replacement work for the new station.

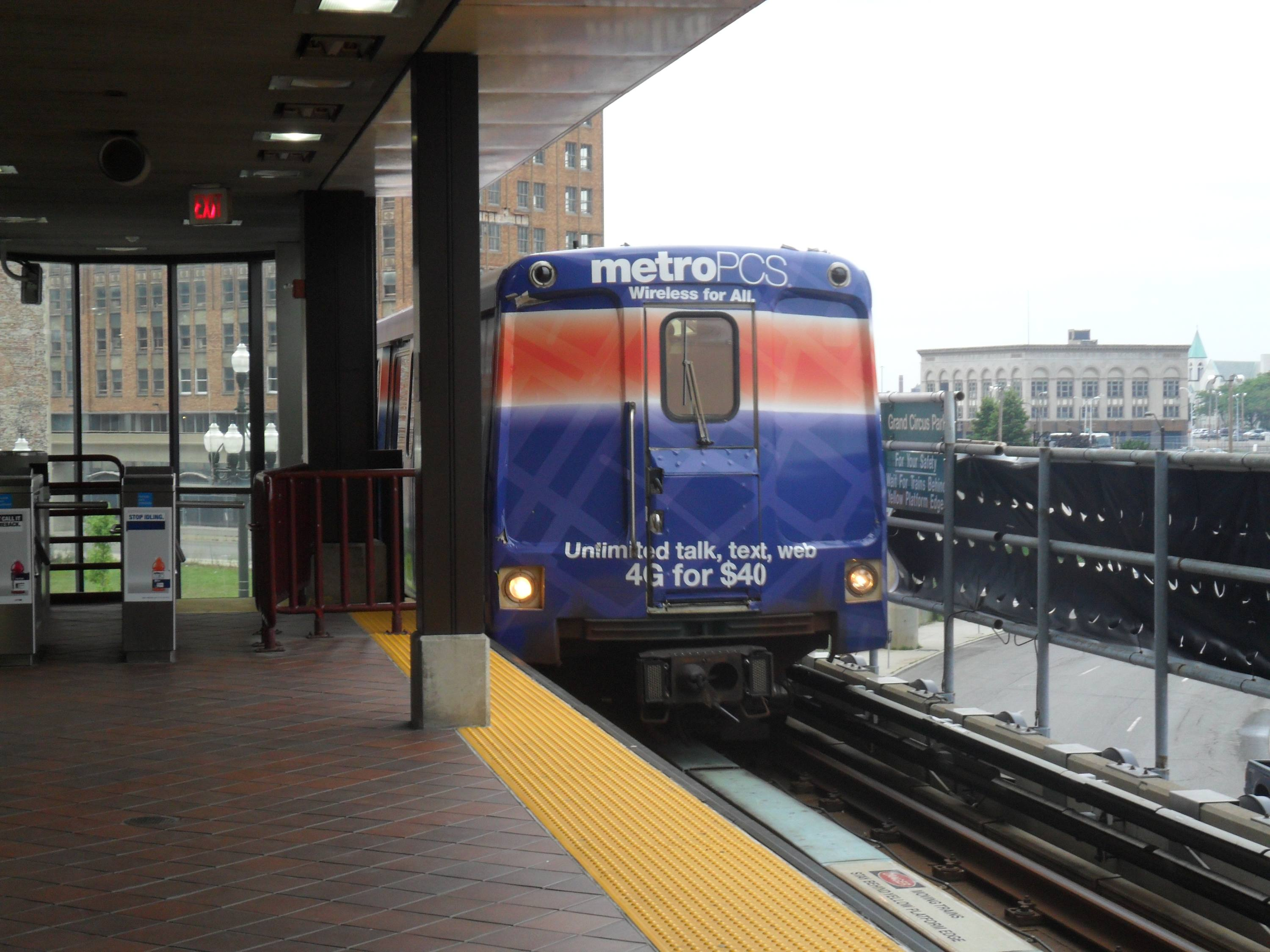
Grand Circus Park station

The Grand Circus Park station closed for renovations on August 16, 2014, as part of renovation work in the David Whitney Building. A new station lobby was added with a direct entrance to the building, and an elevator was added to provide step-free access. Trains continued to operate in a one-way loop, bypassing Grand Circus Park, for most of the station's closure, though the line was briefly split into two segments (with transfers at Millender Center) while part of the track was closed. The Grand Circus Park station officially reopened on June 13, 2015. A connecting QLine station was added shortly thereafter, opening with the system in May 2017.

=== Changes in direction ===
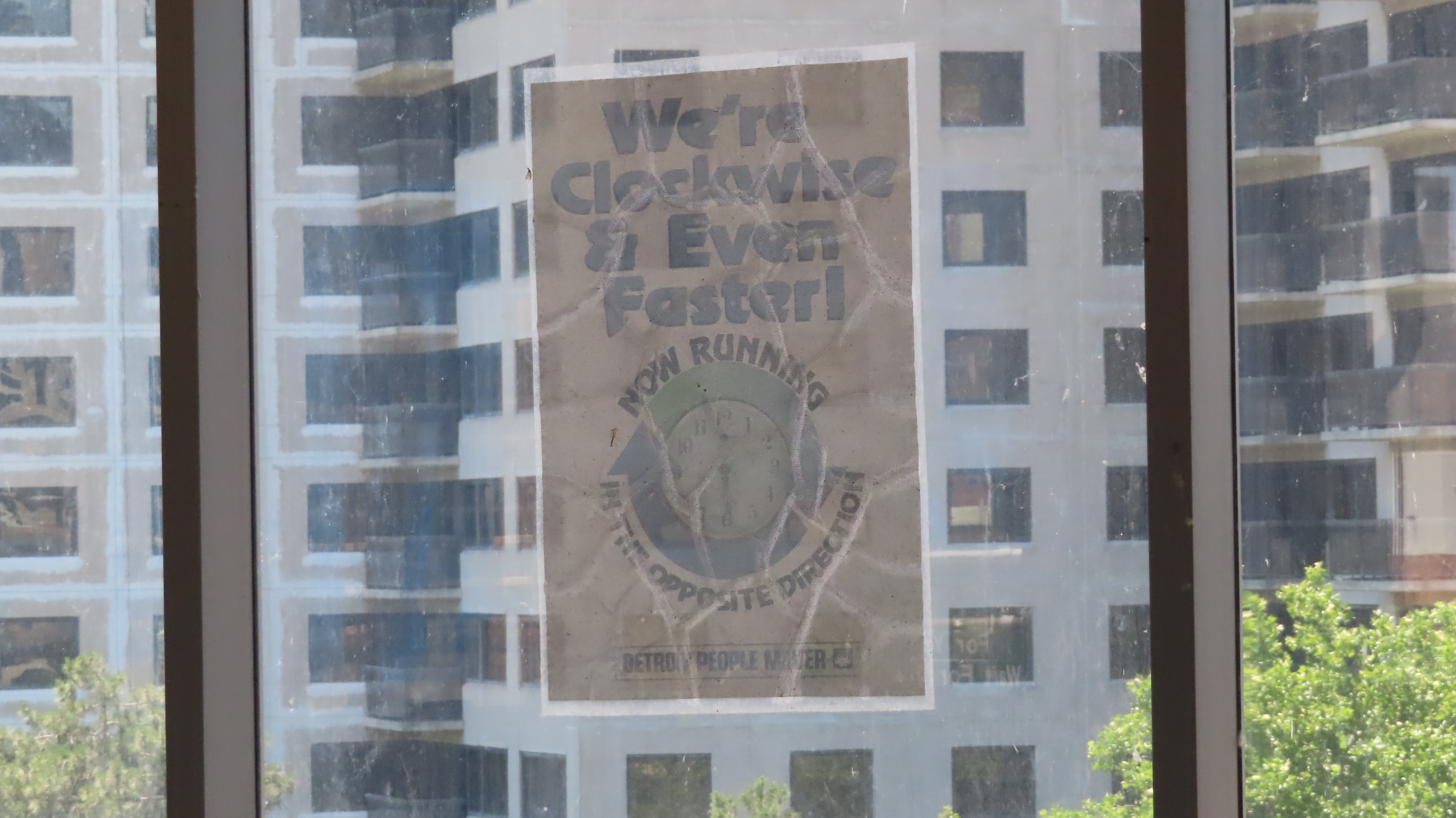
Sign informing riders of the switch to clockwise service in 2008

The system originally ran counter-clockwise. It changed directions to run clockwise in August 2008, following a short closure to replace sections of the track. This change in direction was intended to reduce the time needed to connect between more popular destinations. The switch to clockwise also reduced the time required to complete the loop, as the route, run clockwise, has one short, relatively steep uphill climb, and then coasts downhill for most of the route, allowing trains to use gravity to accelerate.

In late December 2019, the People Mover tested counter-clockwise operation. The system began running counter-clockwise on weekends in February 2020, and then returned to counter-clockwise operation full-time on March 1.

=== COVID-19 shutdown and reopening ===
The People Mover shut down on March 30, 2020, due to reduced ridership amid the COVID-19 pandemic. After a planned 2021 reopening was postponed, the system resumed limited service on May 20, 2022, running six days a week, stopping at only six of the 13 stations. (Note: Michigan, Huntington Place, West Riverfront, Millender Center, Greektown, Grand Circus Park) The remaining seven stations reopened in phases between June 2022 and June 2023. (Note: Broadway and Financial District reopened thirteen days later on June 2, followed by Renaissance Center and Fort/Cass on September 14, Bricktown on November 21, Cadillac Center on May 23, 2023, and Times Square on June 26, 2023.) To attract riders, fares were initially waived from reopening day through August, and later extended through October 2022.

In October 2023, DTC announced that its administrative headquarters would move from the Buhl Building across the street to the Guardian Building.

=== 2020s system upgrades and free service pilot ===
In December 2023, DTC's board of directors approved a one-year pilot program to eliminate fares on the People Mover, supported by a large donation from a corporate sponsor. The program commenced on January 2, 2024, and following an evaluation of the program, in which it was found to have increased system ridership, it was extended through the end of 2025. Priority Waste, a waste management company based in nearby Clinton Township, was announced as the presenting sponsor in March 2024.

Also in December 2023, DTC announced plans to acquire railcars and other surplus equipment from the Toronto Transit Commission, following the decommissioning of the Scarborough RT, a similar system, the prior July.

The system's communication infrastructure was upgraded in early 2024, in preparation for expected large crowds during the 2024 NFL draft. Realtime tracking was added, and each station received upgraded public address and video surveillance systems, plus new passenger information displays and interactive kiosks. Color-changing lights were installed on guideway support columns along Larned Street and Grand Circus Park, and five stations received large exterior murals as part of the Detroit City Walls public art program.

West Riverfront station was renamed Water Square on July 23, 2025. Also in July 2025, station announcements were re-recorded, voiced by Lloyd Jackson Sr., a talk radio personality at WJR.

=== Future planning ===
In October 2025, DTC launched a comprehensive study into potential improvements to the People Mover. The ongoing study will assess the system's efficiency, possible improvements to rider experience and connectivity, and potential expansion of the system.

== Fares ==
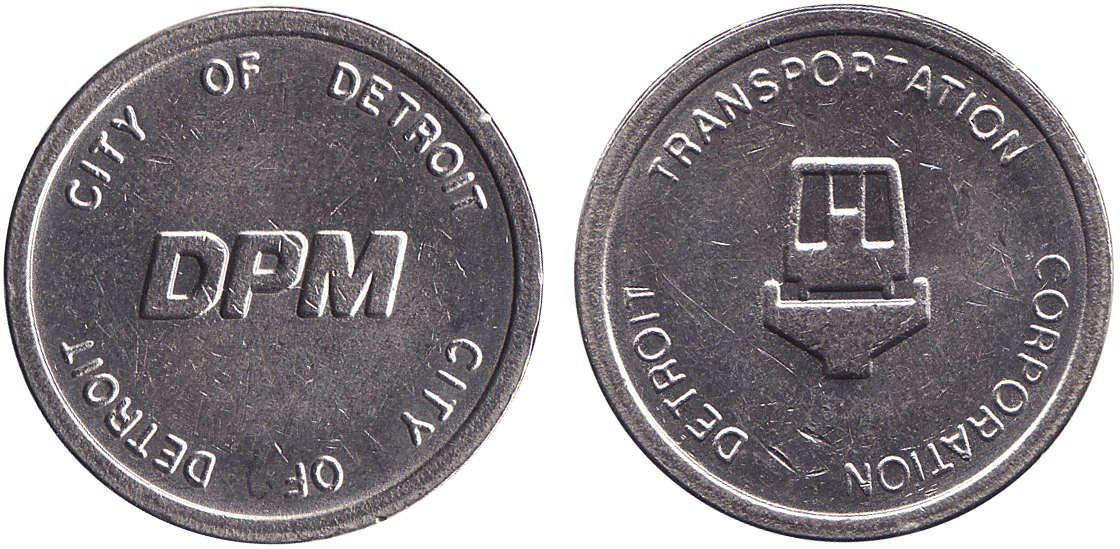
People Mover token

As of 2026, the People Mover is free to ride. Fares were suspended in January 2024 as part of a sponsored pilot program.

Until December 2023, the regular fare was $0.75 per trip, raised from $0.50 in November 2011. Fares were paid at turnstiles with quarters, or with tokens dispensed by vending machines in the stations. Children aged five and under were allowed to ride for free with a paying adult. Monthly and annual passes were sold for $10 and $100 respectively, available on the People Mover's website or at the agency's administrative office. Discounted tokens and passes were available for seniors and disabled riders.

== Ridership, cost-effectiveness, and use ==
The system was designed to move up to 15 million riders a year. In 2008, it served about 2 million riders, an average of about 7,500 people per day, about 2.5 percent of its daily peak capacity of 288,000. In 2006, the Mover filled less than 10 percent of its seats.

Among the busiest periods was the five days around the 2006 Super Bowl XL, when 215,910 patrons used the service. In addition to major downtown concerts and sporting events, other high ridership times include the week of the annual North American International Auto Show in January and the Youmacon anime convention at the end of October, ever since the convention expanded in 2012 to use Huntington Place in addition to the Renaissance Center. The system had 92,384 riders during the 2014 extended con weekend.

In 2006, it was reported that the People Mover cost $8.3 million annually in city and state subsidies to run, and the system has drawn criticism for its cost-effectiveness. In every year between 1997 and 2006, the cost per passenger mile exceeded $3, and was $4.28 in 2009, compared with Detroit bus routes that operated at $0.82 (for comparison, the New York City Subway operates at $0.30 per passenger mile). Edward Glaeser, in his 2011 book, Triumph of the City, referring to high cost of maintenance, calls the Mover "perhaps the most absurd public transit project in the country".

The Mackinac Center for Public Policy reported that according to a 2004 survey, fewer than 30% of the riders were Detroit residents and that Saturday ridership (likely out-of-town residents) dwarfed that of weekday usage.

Before the COVID-19 pandemic, the People Mover generated about $1 million to $1.5 million in revenue annually from fares, conventions, and advertising space. In 2019, about 50% to 60% of riders were office workers in the downtown area, while others included weekend social riders, area residents, tourists, and convention-goers.

== Expansion proposals ==
There have been proposals to extend the People Mover northward to the New Center and neighborhoods not within walking distance of the city's downtown. A proposal was put forward by Marsden Burger, former manager of the People Mover, to double the length of the route by extending the People Mover along Woodward Avenue to West Grand Boulevard and into the New Center area. New stops would have included the Amtrak station, Wayne State University, the Detroit Medical Center, and Henry Ford Hospital. The plan was proposed at a tentative cost of $150–200 million, and would have been paid for by a combination of public and private financing.

Much of the proposed route to the New Center was ultimately adopted by the QLine streetcar, which opened in 2017.

== Rolling stock ==
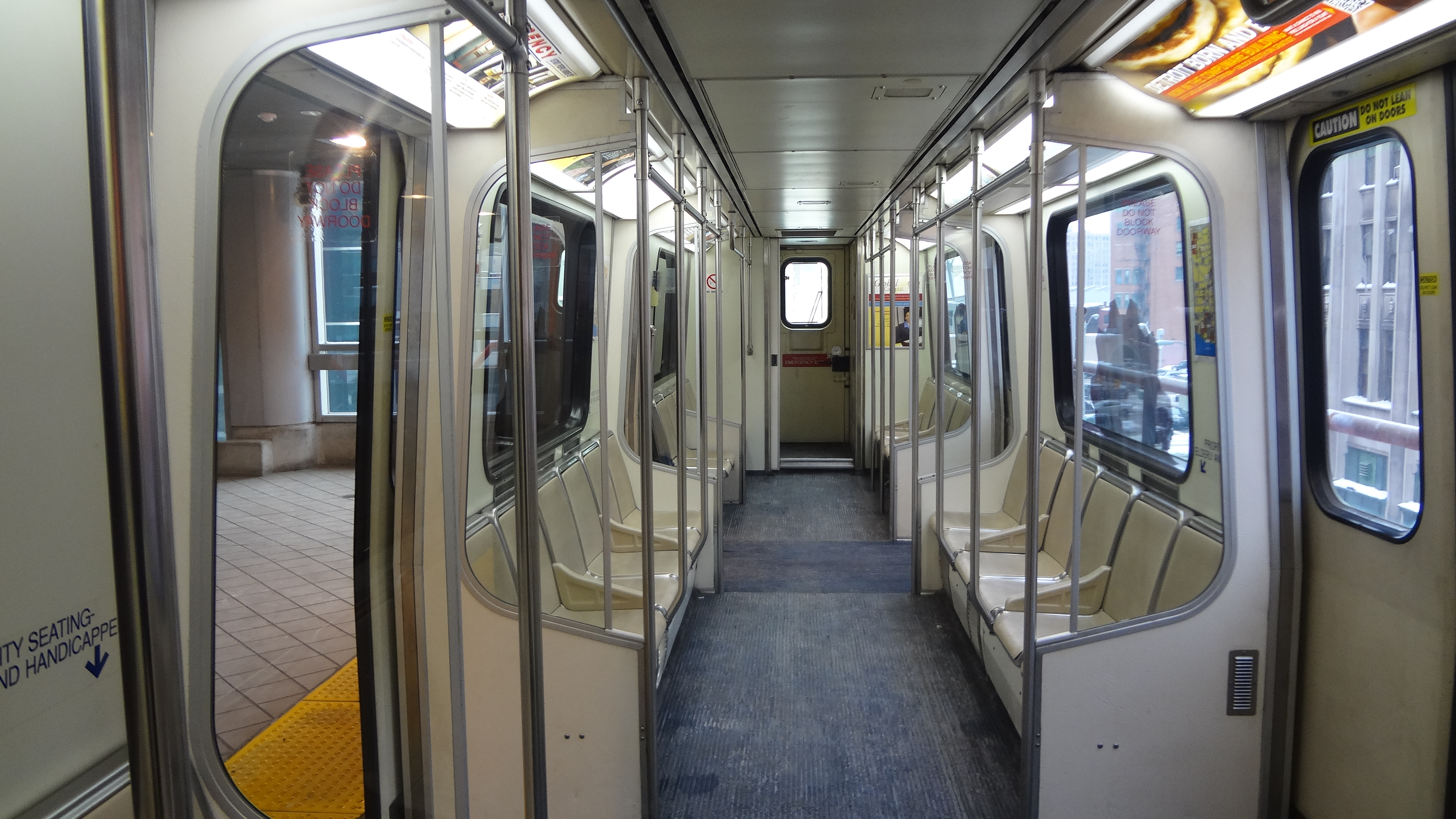
Interior of a People Mover railcar

The People Mover's fleet consists of 12 automated Intermediate Capacity Transit System Mark I cars, built in 1986 by the Urban Transportation Development Corporation in Kingston, Ontario. They nearly always operate in two-car trains, but are not in married pairs, and are capable of interchanging or operating as single units. The trains were delivered in a white livery with green and yellow stripes, but since the 2000s have been wrapped with advertisements.

The model is also used on the SkyTrain in Vancouver, and was also operated on the now-decommissioned Scarborough RT in Toronto.

=== Replacement ===
DTC plans to replace its fleet with 12 used railcars of the same model from the Toronto Transit Commission. These railcars operated on the Scarborough RT until its closure, and were extensively refurbished and upgraded in the 2010s, giving them a longer service lifespan than the People Mover's existing cars, despite being of similar age.

The purchase of these railcars was first announced in December 2023, and also includes surplus parts to repair the People Mover's existing vehicles in the interim. Delivery and integration of the newly purchased cars is expected to take 18 months, with the first of them slated to enter service in 2027.

== Operations ==
As of 2026, the People Mover operates from 6:30 a.m. to midnight on weekdays, from 10:00 a.m. to midnight on Saturdays, and from 10:00 a.m. to 10:00 p.m. on Sundays, with hours extended during certain downtown events. Huntington Place station closes nightly at 10:00 p.m. on all days, except when a major event is taking place there.

The People Mover's operations center, garage, and maintenance shops are located in the Maintenance and Control Facility, attached to the Times Square station. Cars enter the garage via a siding, which branches off from the main line to a second platform at Times Square. This siding allows the system to be used in a two-way bypass manner when part of the circular track is closed. Maintenance equipment is lifted up to track level by crane, but not stored with the DPM cars.

=== Incidents ===
In 1990, a People Mover train derailed at Cadillac Center after a manhole cover fell onto the track.

In January 2015, a train derailed and crashed into the platform at Times Square, dislodging one of its doors on impact. No injuries were reported, though the system was shut down for 17 hours for an investigation. According to a DTC press release, a bracket beneath the train was found to have dislodged and caught underneath the rear car, causing the train to disengage from the track.

In May 2016, a 53-year-old man, reportedly under the influence of alcohol, fell onto the track between the cars of a stopped train at Times Square, and was dragged to his death when the train departed normally. Following the incident, bollards were added to the system's platforms, preventing passengers from falling into the space between the cars. The man's family filed a lawsuit, alleging negligence on the part of DTC. As of 2026, this incident is the only fatal accident in the People Mover's history.

On March 13, 2026, the system was unexpectedly shut down after severe winds blew debris onto the track, which was subsequently found to have significantly damaged track equipment. The system remained closed for repairs for nearly two months before reopening on May 6.

== Governance ==
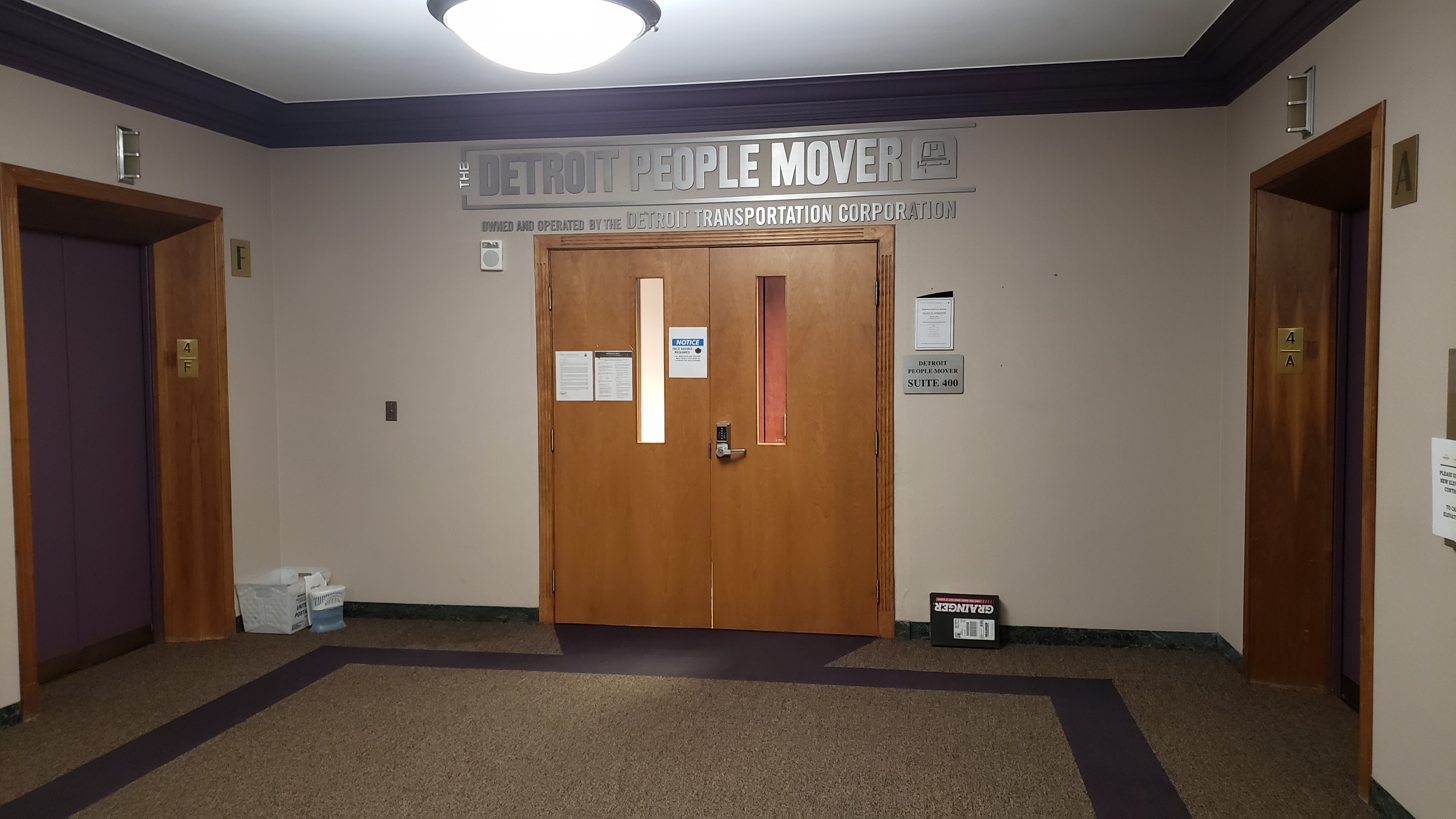
Former DTC offices, Buhl Building

The People Mover is owned and operated by the Detroit Transportation Corporation (DTC), a public body corporate funded primarily by, but independent of, the Detroit city government.

The agency is headquartered on the 29th floor of the Guardian Building, near the Financial District station. It is governed by a six-member Board of Directors, which appoints an executive General Manager to oversee day-to-day operations. The Board consists of four officers from the Mayor of Detroit's cabinet, the president of the Detroit City Council, and the chair of the board of directors of SMART.

=== Transit Police and security ===
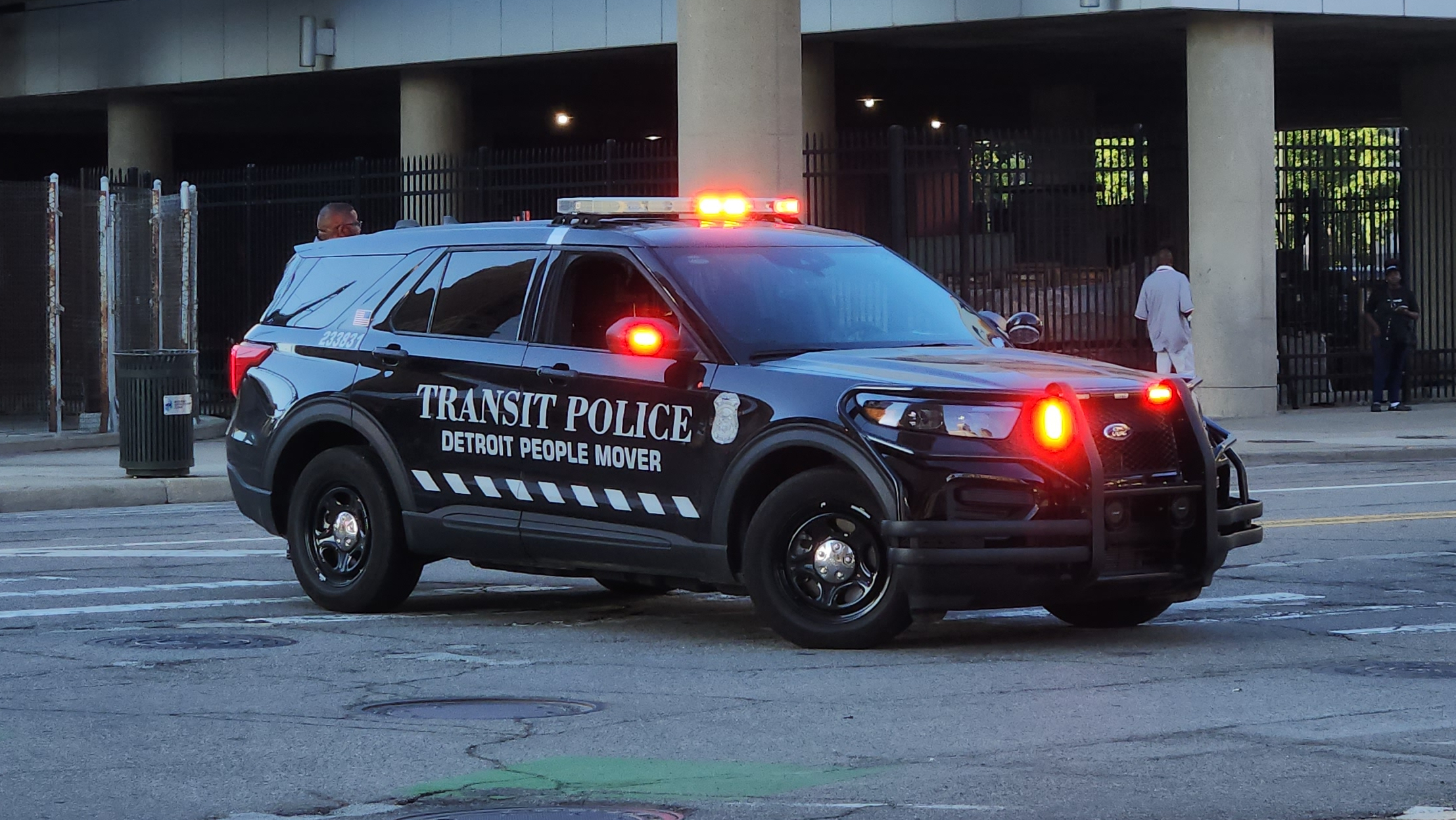
Transit Police patrol vehicle

The People Mover is patrolled by its own in-house police agency, the Detroit Transit Police, a division of DTC that operates separately from the Detroit Police Department. Its 15 officers are dedicated exclusively to the People Mover.

In addition to the People Mover, the Transit Police previously provided police services to DDOT and the QLINE under contract. This arrangement began in March 2014, due to a shortage of Detroit Police Department officers amid the Detroit bankruptcy, and was expanded to include the QLINE when it opened in 2017. Police operations on DDOT and the QLINE were assumed by the Detroit Police Department in July 2024.

Security patrols on the People Mover were contracted to the private security firm City Shield Security Services from May 2022 until April 2023, and to Securitas from April 2023 until June 2024.

=== Collective bargaining ===
The People Mover's control center operators, maintenance technicians, and Transit Police officers are represented by Teamsters Local 214; while maintenance supervisors are members of AFSCME Local 2394.

== Stations ==
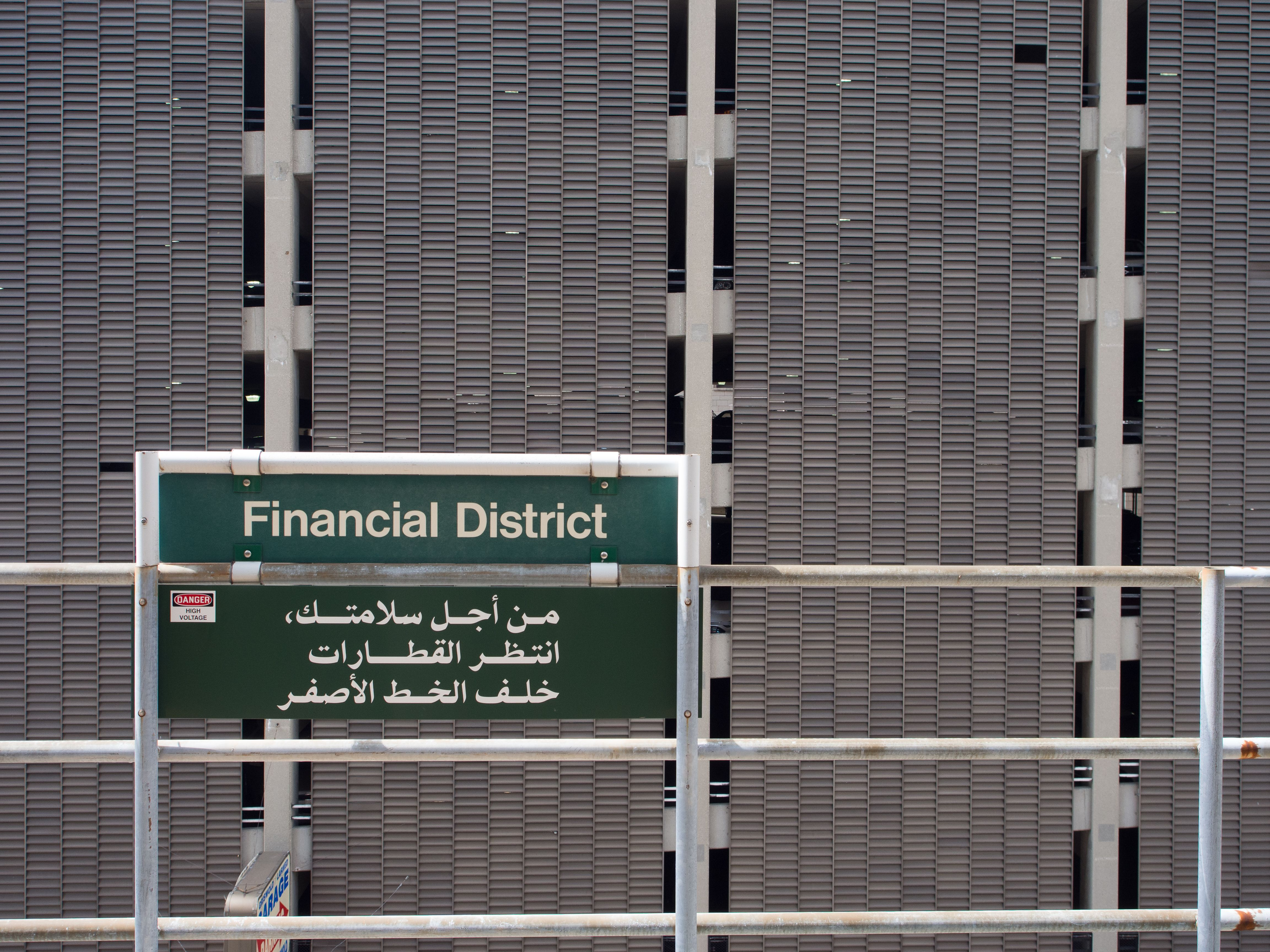
Some station signage is translated into Spanish and Arabic

The network has 13 stations. As the system runs in a one-way loop with a single track, each station only has one side platform, except for Times Square, which has a siding leading to the system's garage and an island platform.

Station	Location
Michigan	1220 Cass Avenue at Michigan Avenue
Fort/Cass	711 Cass Avenue at W Fort Street
Huntington Place	inside Huntington Place, 1 Washington Boulevard at Congress Street
Water Square	600 Civic Center Drive at W Jefferson Avenue
Financial District	133 W Larned Street at Shelby Street (attached to 150 West Jefferson)
Millender Center	inside the Millender Center, 333 E Jefferson Avenue at Randolph Street
Renaissance Center	400 E Jefferson Avenue at Beaubien Boulevard (attached to the Renaissance Center)
Bricktown	710 Beaubien Boulevard at E Fort Street
Greektown	1055 Beaubien Boulevard at Monroe Street (attached to Hollywood Casino at Greektown)
Cadillac Center	110 Gratiot Avenue at Library Street (attached to One Campus Martius parking garage)
Broadway	1441 Broadway Street at John R Street
Grand Circus Park	1 Park Avenue at Woodward Avenue (attached to the David Whitney Building)
Times Square	1250 Park Place at Grand River Avenue

=== Public art ===
Originally, the 13 stations were not planned to have any distinctive features. However, in 1984, after construction had recently begun, Irene Walt assembled a volunteer committee to persuade the project agency to include artwork in each station. Called the Downtown Detroit People Mover Art Commission (later known as Art in the Stations), they raised $2 million to finance the project. As a result, there are 18 new original pieces of art spread throughout the stations, plus a piece from 1903 that had previously been in storage, on permanent loan from the Detroit Institute of Arts.

The commission's efforts and art installation were documented in a 30-minute film, Art in the Stations, by Sue Marx and Pamela Conn, who had recently won an Academy Award for the short documentary Young at Heart. Art in the Stations premiered at the Detroit Institute of Arts in 1989. In 2004, a coffee table book by Walt, also titled Art in the Stations, was published, with photographs by Balthazar Korab and information on all the station artwork and the artists who created them.

Art was completed with the system opening in 1987 unless otherwise noted:

- Grand Circus Park
  - Catching Up (Artist: J. Seward Johnson Jr – bronze statue)
- Times Square
  - In Honor of W. Hawkins Ferry (Artist: Tom Phardel / Pewabic Pottery – glazed tile)
  - Untitled (1993) (Artist: Anat Shiftan / Pewabic Pottery – tile mural)
- Michigan Avenue
  - Voyage (Artist: Allie McGhee – tile mural)
  - On the Move (Artist: Kirk Newman – cast bronze shape on tile)
- Fort/Cass
  - Untitled (Artist: Farley Tobin – tile mural)
  - Progression II (1993) (Artist: Sandra jo Osip – bronze sculpture)
- Huntington Place
  - Calvacade of Cars (1988) (Artist: Larry Ebel/Linda Cianciolo Scarlett – mural)
- Water Square
  - Voyage (Artist: Gerome Kamrowski – venetian glass mosaic)
- Financial District
  - 'D' for Detroit (Artist: Joyce Kozloff – hand painted ceramic mural)
- Millender Center
  - Detroit New Morning (Artist: Alvin D. Loving Jr. – painted glazed tiles)
- Renaissance Center
  - Dreamers and Voyagers Come to Detroit (Artist: George Woodman – ceramic tile mural; destroyed with original station's demolition in 2002)
  - Siberian Ram (1993) (Artist: Marshall Fredericks – cast bronze sculpture)
  - Path Games (2004) (Artist: George Woodman – ceramic tile mural)
- Bricktown
  - Beaubien Passage (Artist: Glen Michaels – bas relief on porcelain panels)
- Greektown
  - Neon for the Greektown Station (Artist: Stephen Antonakos – free form neon light display)
- Cadillac Center
  - In Honour of Mary Chase Stratton (Artist: Diana Kulisek Pancioli/Pewabic Pottery – tile mural interspersed with bronze plaque by Carlo Romanelli 1903)
- Broadway
  - The Blue Nile (Artist: Charles McGee – painted mural panels)
  - Untitled (Artist: Jun Kaneko – tile)

==== City Walls murals ====
In 2024, the exterior walls of five People Mover stations were adorned with large painted murals, as part of the Detroit City Walls public art program.

- Michigan Avenue
  - A Peaceful Place (Artist: Kenyada Kelsaw – acrylic latex paint on Polytab cloth)
- Fort/Cass
  - Slice of Life in Detroit: Homage to the Working Class (Artist: Nicole Macdonald – spray paint)
- Water Square
  - Detroit Moves People (Artist: Nick Pizaña)
- Bricktown
  - Detroit Music Love (Artist: Anthony Lee – enamel and spray paint)
- Broadway
  - Welcome to Date Night in Paradise (Artist: Charles Martin Miller – latex paint on Polytab cloth)

== In popular culture ==
- "People Mover" is the title of a 2007 track, which features Pat Piff, on the first mixtape titled Finally Famous: The Mixtape by Detroit rapper Big Sean. In 2025, Big Sean was featured in a mural painted on the Bricktown station beside other Detroit artists such as Aretha Franklin, Eminem and Smokey Robinson.
- "Detroit People Mover" is the title of a track by British electronic musician Squarepusher, from his 2020 album Be Up a Hello. The music video for the track was filmed on board the People Mover.

== See also ==
- Art on the Move
- List of rapid transit systems
- List of United States rapid transit systems by ridership
- Metromover
- Transportation in metropolitan Detroit
