= Renaissance Center station =

Detroit People Mover station

Renaissance Center
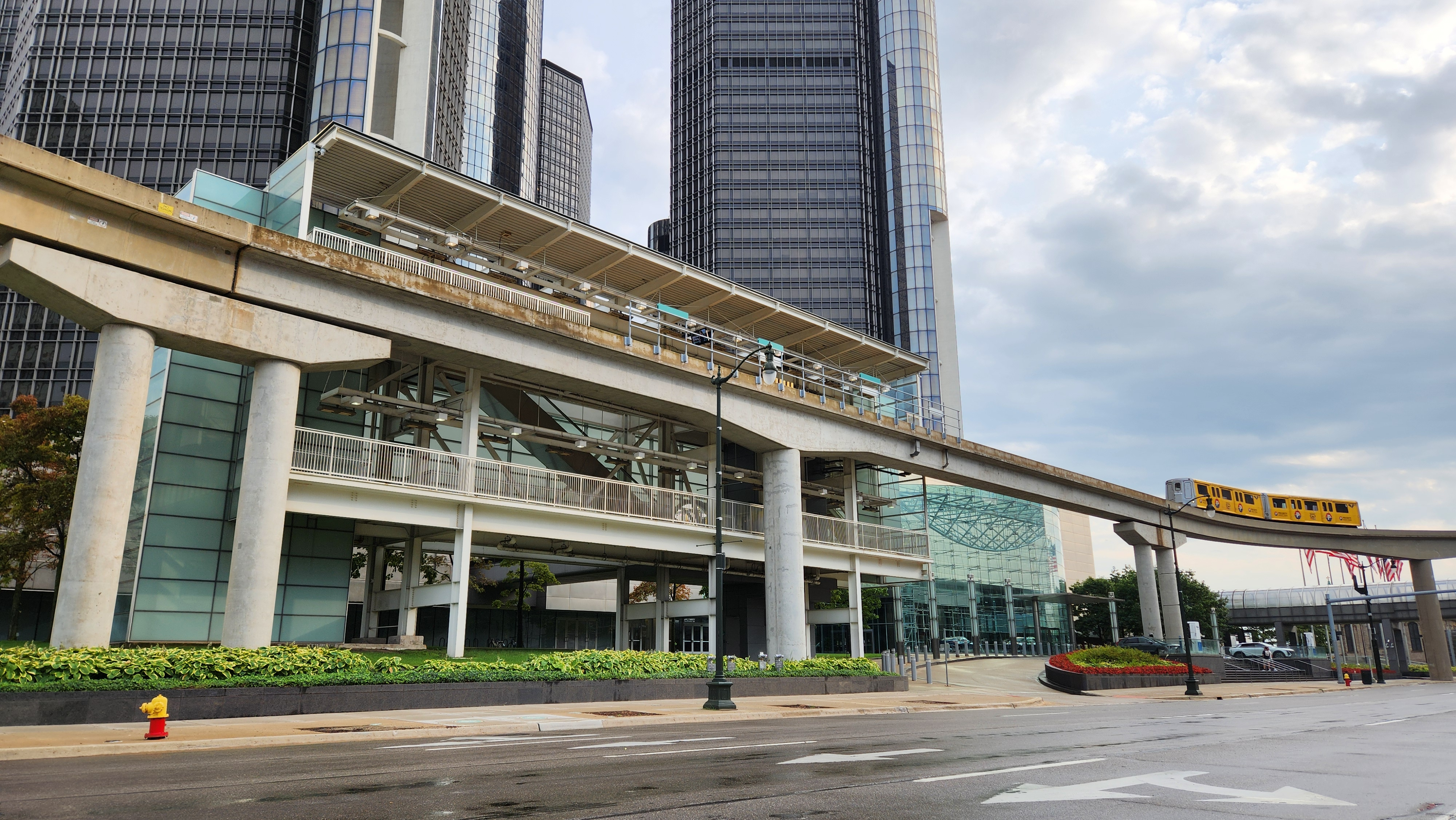

General information
- Location: 400 E Jefferson Avenue; Detroit, Michigan 48243; United States
- Coordinates: 42°19′49″N 83°02′24″W
- Owner: Detroit Transportation Corporation
- Platforms: 1 side platform
- Tracks: 1
- Connections: DDOT 9

Construction
- Structure type: Elevated
- Accessible: yes

History
- Opened: July 31, 1987
- Rebuilt: 2004

Passengers
- 2014: 487,758
- Rank: 2 out of 13

Services
Preceding station	Detroit People Mover	Following station
Millender Center One-way operation	Detroit People Mover	Bricktown Next counter-clockwise
Former services (pre-2001)
Preceding station	Detroit Downtown Trolley	Following station
Jefferson Avenue/Hart Plaza trolley stops toward Grand Circus Park	Detroit Downtown Trolley	Terminus
Location

Renaissance Center station is a Detroit People Mover station in downtown Detroit, Michigan. It is located on Jefferson Avenue at Beaubien Boulevard, attached to the Renaissance Center complex. The station's lobby is located inside the Renaissance Center, on its second floor, with a street-level entrance connected by an elevator; a skybridge connects the lobby to the station structure.

The station serves the Renaissance Center, which provides access to the Detroit Riverwalk, and is connected by skybridge to the Millender Center, which also has its own People Mover station. In 2014, this stop was the second most heavily trafficked (behind only Greektown) with 487,758 riders.

== History ==
The original Renaissance Center station opened with the system on July 31, 1987, and was built into a large concrete berm separating the Center from downtown Detroit. The station and berms were demolished in September 2002, after which the current station was completed, opening on November 22, 2004.

The People Mover shut down temporarily on March 30, 2020, due to decreased ridership amid the COVID-19 pandemic. Following the system's May 2022 restart, the station reopened on September 14, 2022.

== Public art ==
Both the original and rebuilt stations opened with tile mosaics created by George Woodman. The original station's work, Dreamers and Voyagers Come to Detroit, consisted of hundreds of multicolored hexagonal tiles, designed by Woodman to connect in infinite combinations. It was destroyed in 2002 with the station's demolition, and Woodman was commissioned to design a replacement work, Path Games, for the new station. Path Games emulates its predecessor, with 2,625 square tiles of similar design.

The station's lobby also features Siberian Ram, a bronze sculpture by Marshall Fredericks, a Michigan sculptor best known for creating The Spirit of Detroit. Siberian Ram is displayed against a backdrop of green Pewabic Pottery tiles, similar to those used at Cadillac Center station, flanked on either side by Path Games.
