= Water Square station =

Detroit People Mover station

Water Square
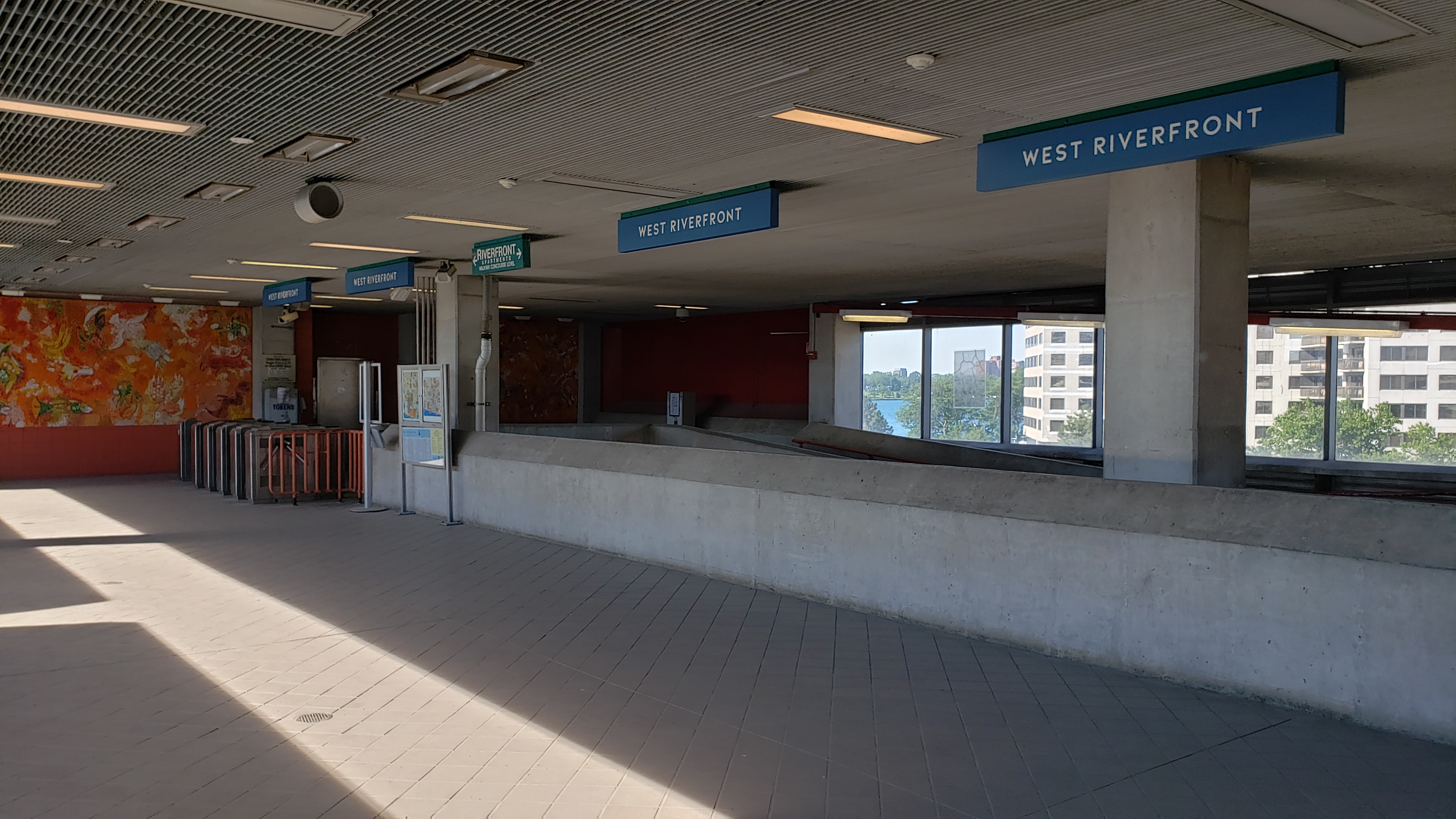
- Station platform in 2022 (as West Riverfront)

General information
- Location: 600 Civic Center Drive; Detroit, Michigan 48226; United States
- Coordinates: 42°19′31″N 83°03′09″W
- Owner: Detroit Transportation Corporation
- Platforms: 1 side platform
- Tracks: 1

Construction
- Accessible: y

History
- Opened: July 31, 1987
- Former names: Joe Louis Arena (1987–2022); West Riverfront (2022–2025)

Passengers
- 2014: 177,618
- Rank: 4 out of 13

Services
| Preceding station | Detroit People Mover | Following station |
|---|---|---|
| Huntington Place One-way operation | Detroit People Mover | Financial District Next counter-clockwise |
Location

Water Square station (formerly Joe Louis Arena and West Riverfront) is a Detroit People Mover station in downtown Detroit, Michigan. It is located on Steve Yzerman Drive across from the former site of the Joe Louis Arena, near the intersection of 3rd Street and Jefferson Avenue.

Water Square is the nearest People Mover station to the Downtown campus of the Wayne County Community College District, and also serves the Detroit Riverwalk.

== History ==
The station previously served the Joe Louis Arena, the home of the NHL's Detroit Red Wings, until the arena's closure in 2017. The station was built with a series of wide concrete ramps from street level to the platform, allowing it to handle the flow of large crowds from events at the arena, and a pedestrian bridge linking the station's concourse level directly to the arena's entrance. The arena bridge was demolished in 2019 alongside the arena itself, though two enclosed skybridges remain, connecting the station to the Riverfront Towers residential complex and the disused arena parking garage.

The People Mover shut down temporarily on March 30, 2020, due to decreased ridership amid the COVID-19 pandemic. Following the arena's demolition, the station was renamed West Riverfront when it reopened with the system's restart on May 20, 2022.

The station was renamed again to Water Square on July 23, 2025 to reflect the under-construction Water Square Development on the arena site, anchored by the Residences Water Square tower. Exterior renovations are planned for the station in 2026, supported by a donation from the Sterling Group, developer of Water Square.

== Public art ==
The platform includes a Venetian glass mosaic, Voyage, created by Gerome Kamrowski. The iridescent mosaic reflects the orange hues used in the station's tile, with designs inspired by mythological and astrological figures.
