= Malacca Sultanate Palace Museum =

Museum in Malacca City, Malacca, Malaysia

- Muzium Istana Kesultanan Melaka
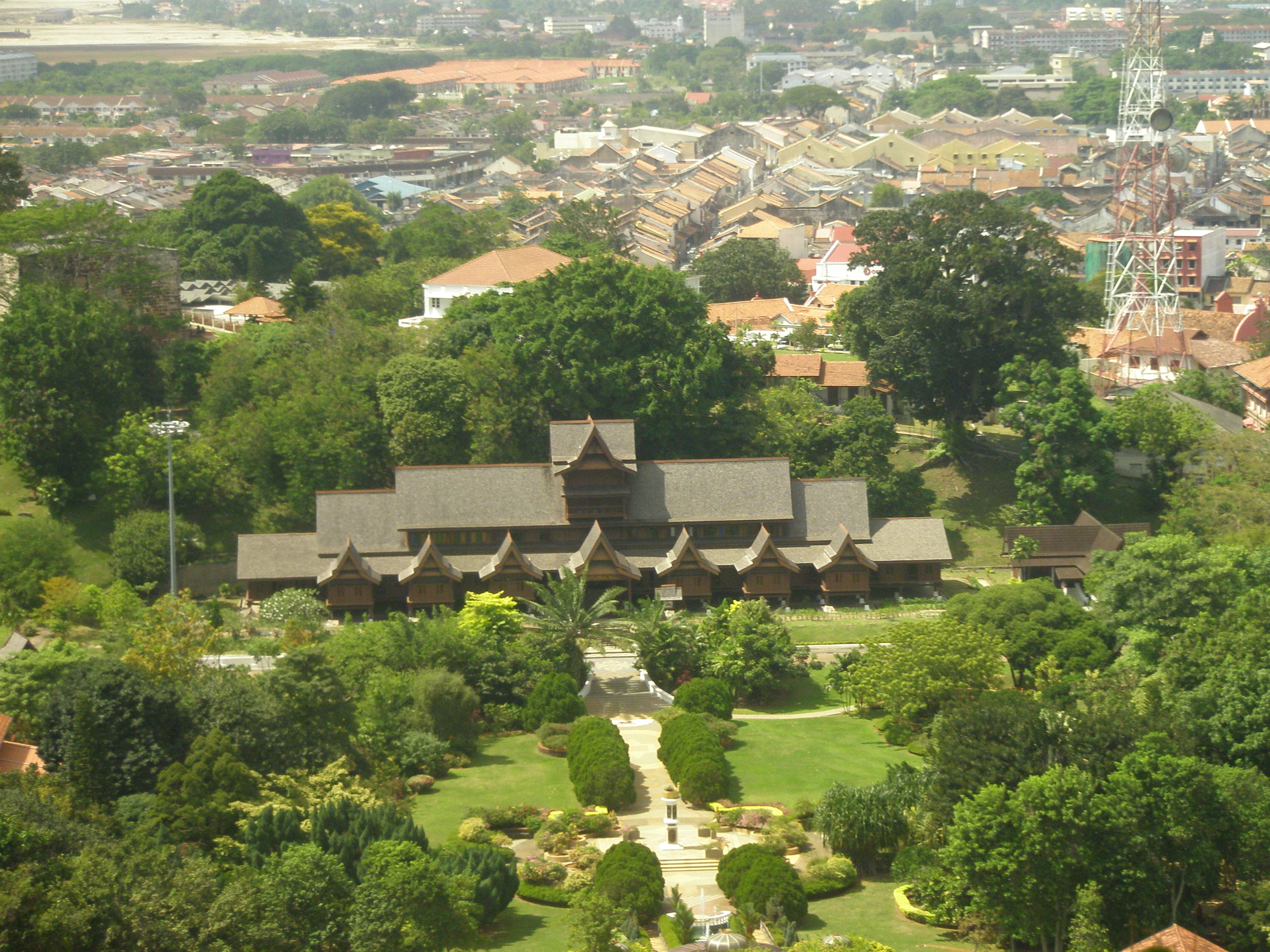
- Bird's-eye view of the Palace Replica Museum at St Paul's Hill. A monument (bottom middle) was erected at its entrance to mark the declaration of Malacca Town as a historic city in 1989.
- Established: 17 July 1986
- Location: Malacca City, Malacca, Malaysia
- Coordinates: 2.1929°N 102.2504°E
- Type: museum
- Owner: Malacca Museum Corporation (PERZIM)

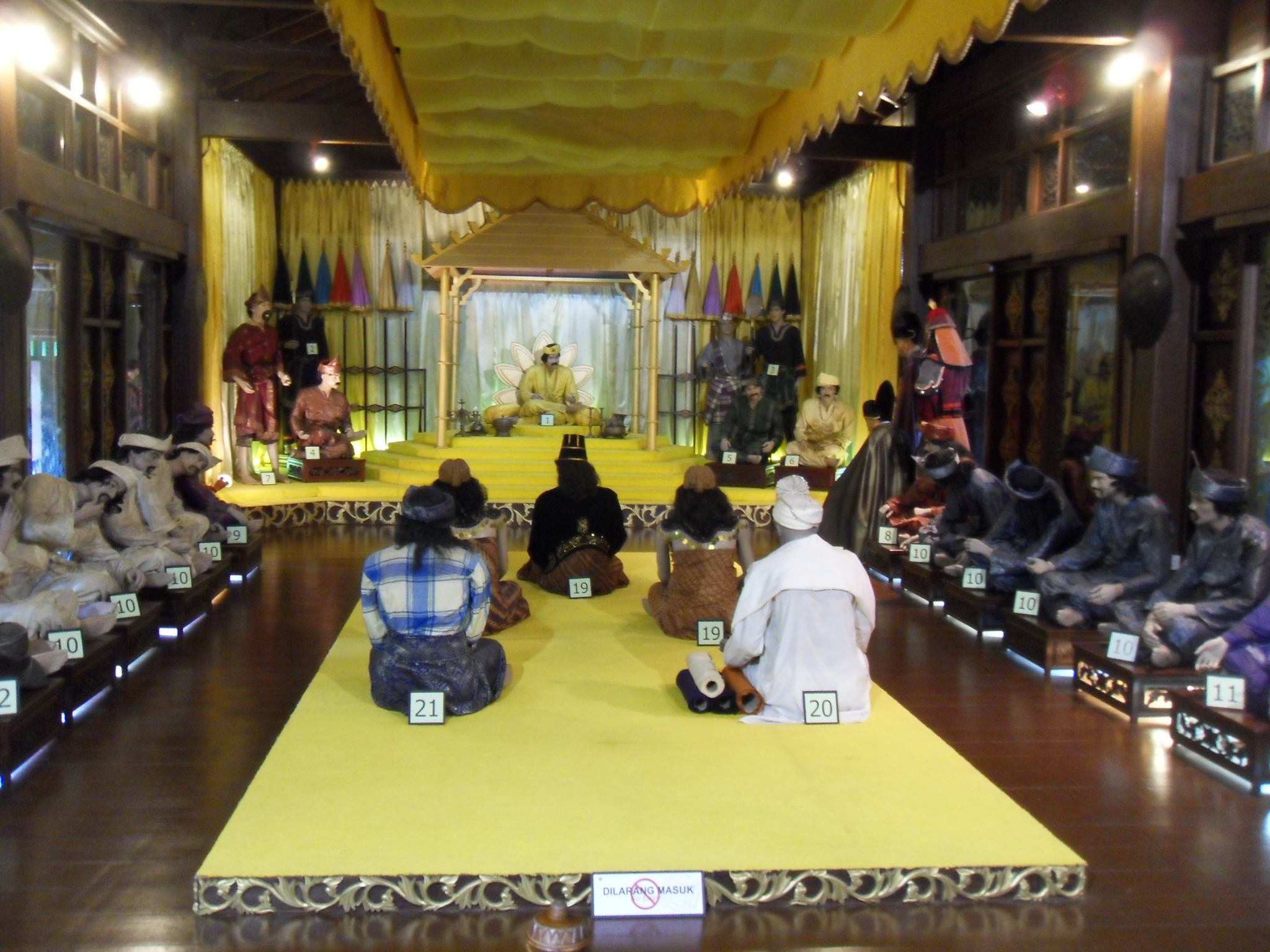
Malacca Sultanate Palace Museum exhibition hall.

Malacca Sultanate Palace Museum (Malay: Muzium Istana Kesultanan Melaka) also known as the Melaka Sultanate Palace Museum (Note: The State Government uses the Malay language spelling of the state, as opposed to the more traditional English language spelling of its name, Malacca.) is a museum located at the foot of St. Paul's Hill in Malacca City, Malacca, Malaysia. The building is a modern reconstruction of the palace of the Malacca Sultanate, based on the information and data obtained from the Malay Annals. It is made up of hardwood (for its structure), 'belian' wood (for its roof) and wooden pegs (instead of nails) and was constructed at a cost of MYR 3.09 million. Construction of this museum began in October 1984 and was completed in April 1986. The museum was officially opened on 17 July 1986 by Prime Minister Mahathir Mohamad.

The museum consists of three floors and divided into eight chambers and three galleries. The first floor mainly consists of the throne room of a typical Sultanate Palace, the second floor consists of various Sultan's chambers including the one used for sleeping, whereas the third one displays many of the sultan's stored possessions. Around 1,350 items including artifacts like sultan's weapons, clothings and regalia and paintings, as well as dioramas of historical events and human figures during the sultanate period are displayed in this museum.

On 15 April 1989, the museum was the site of the declaration of Malacca Town as a historic city. A monument topped by a golden tengkolok (headgear) as well as a semicircular tile art were erected at its entrance to mark this occasion.

== See also ==
- List of museums in Malaysia
- List of tourist attractions in Malacca

== Literature ==
- Lenzi, Iola (2004). Museums of Southeast Asia. Singapore: Archipelago Press. pp. 200 pages. ISBN 981-4068-96-9.
