= Financial District station =

Financial District station may refer to:

- Financial District station (Detroit)
- Financial District station (Miami)
