= Riverfront Towers =

Skyscraper in Detroit

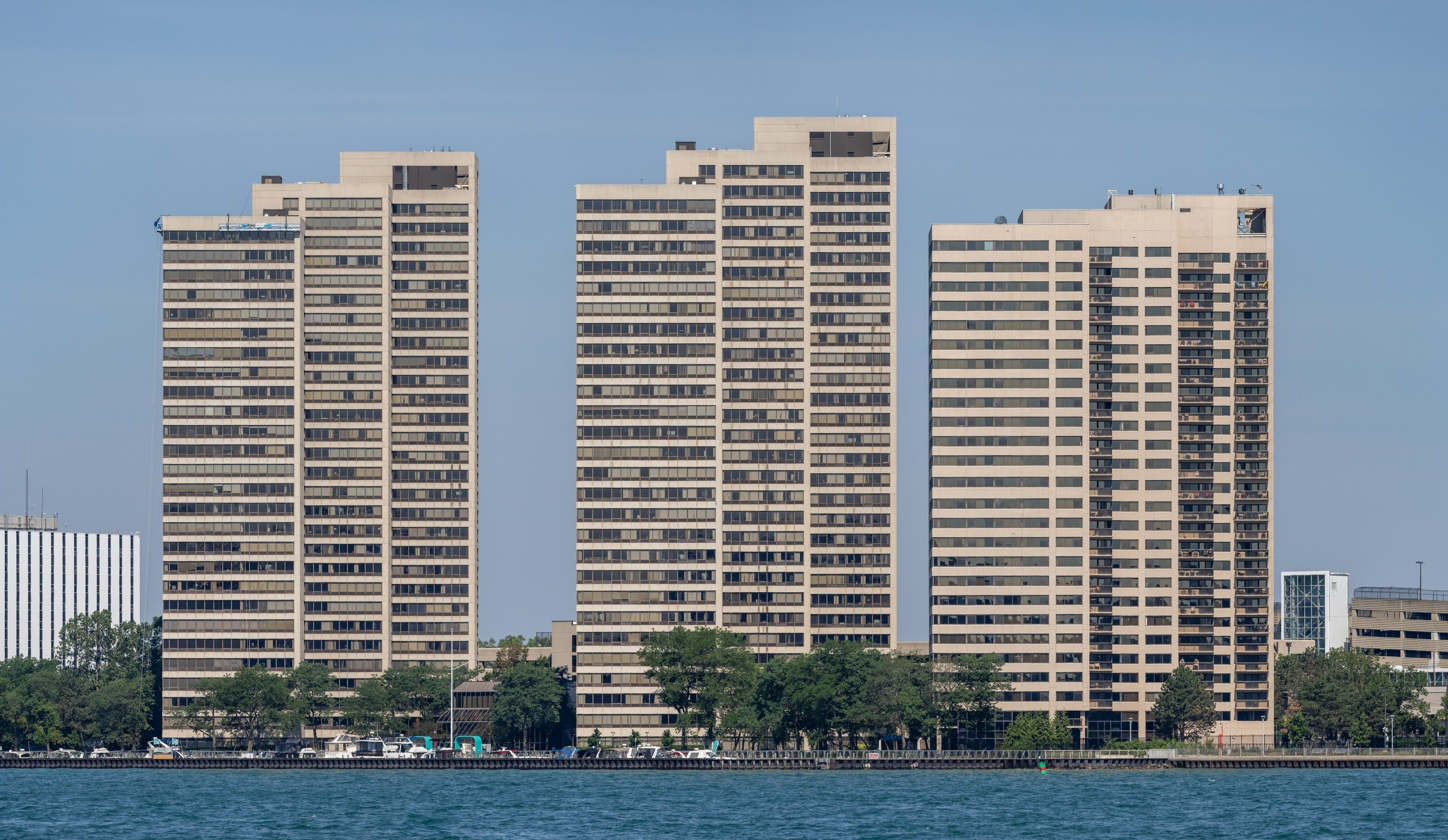
- Riverfront Apartment/Condominium Complex
- Interactive map of the Riverfront Towers area

General information
- Type: residential high rise
- Location: Detroit, Michigan; United States
- Coordinates: 42.324°N 83.055°W
- Construction started: 1982 (Towers 200 & 300); 1991 (Tower 100)
- Completed: 1983 (Towers 200 & 300); 1992 (Tower 100)

Height
- Roof: 256 ft (78 m) (Tower 100); 304 ft (93 m) (Towers 200 & 300)

Technical details
- Floor count: 26 (Tower 100); 29 (Towers 200 & 300)

Design and construction
- Architect: Kadushin

Other information
- Public transit: Water Square

Website
- https://www.ampresidential.com/riverfront-towers-detroit-mi

Riverfront Towers is an apartment and condominium complex of three high rise residential skyscrapers along the International Riverfront in Downtown Detroit, Michigan, United States. Each Riverfront Tower creates an ascending tier of three towers.

== Buildings ==
The three buildings are examples of modern architecture. Towers one and two are apartments, Tower three contains condominiums.

- Riverfront Tower 100 is a 275 unit high rise at 100 Riverfront Drive, built in 1991 and finished in 1992.
- Riverfront Tower 200 is a 280 unit high rise at 200 Riverfront Drive, built in 1982 and finished in 1983.
- Riverfront Tower 300 is a 295 unit high rise at 300 Riverfront Drive, built in 1982 and finished in 1983.

== Amenities ==
The towers include a large pool and a fitness center.

== Education ==
The Riverfront Towers properties are zoned for school attendance in the Detroit Public Schools, the Owen Academy at Pelham (K–8), and King High School.

== Health and safety concerns ==
On January 8, 2018, a pipe burst on the 6th floor of Riverfront Towers at Building 100. The alarms went off at 6 a.m. On September 10, 2018, at around 8:00 PM, power to building 200 was lost. The building was evacuated under emergency conditions. The fire department arrived to verify why the fire alarm went off and determined it was due to loss of power to the building. For the next few days, building 200 did not have running water. The Riverfront management worked to get a temporary generator unit in to have basic power supplied to building 200.

On February 8, 2019, there was a pipe burst that flooded 22 apartments in building 200 of Riverfront towers. According to the Detroit Free Press, there was "no expect completion date for repairs and renovations to the apartment."

== Notable residents ==
- Aretha Franklin, singer, lived in the apartments at the time of her death in 2018.
- Rosa Parks, civil rights activist, lived in the towers from 1994 until her death in 2005.
- Coleman A. Young, mayor of Detroit from 1974 to 1994.
- Nancy Kerrigan, figure skater, lived in the apartments during her infamous 1994 assault.
- Christoper Paul Curtis, Newbery Medal Award-winning author of Bud, Not Buddy and The Watsons Go to Birmingham – 1963.

== Gallery ==
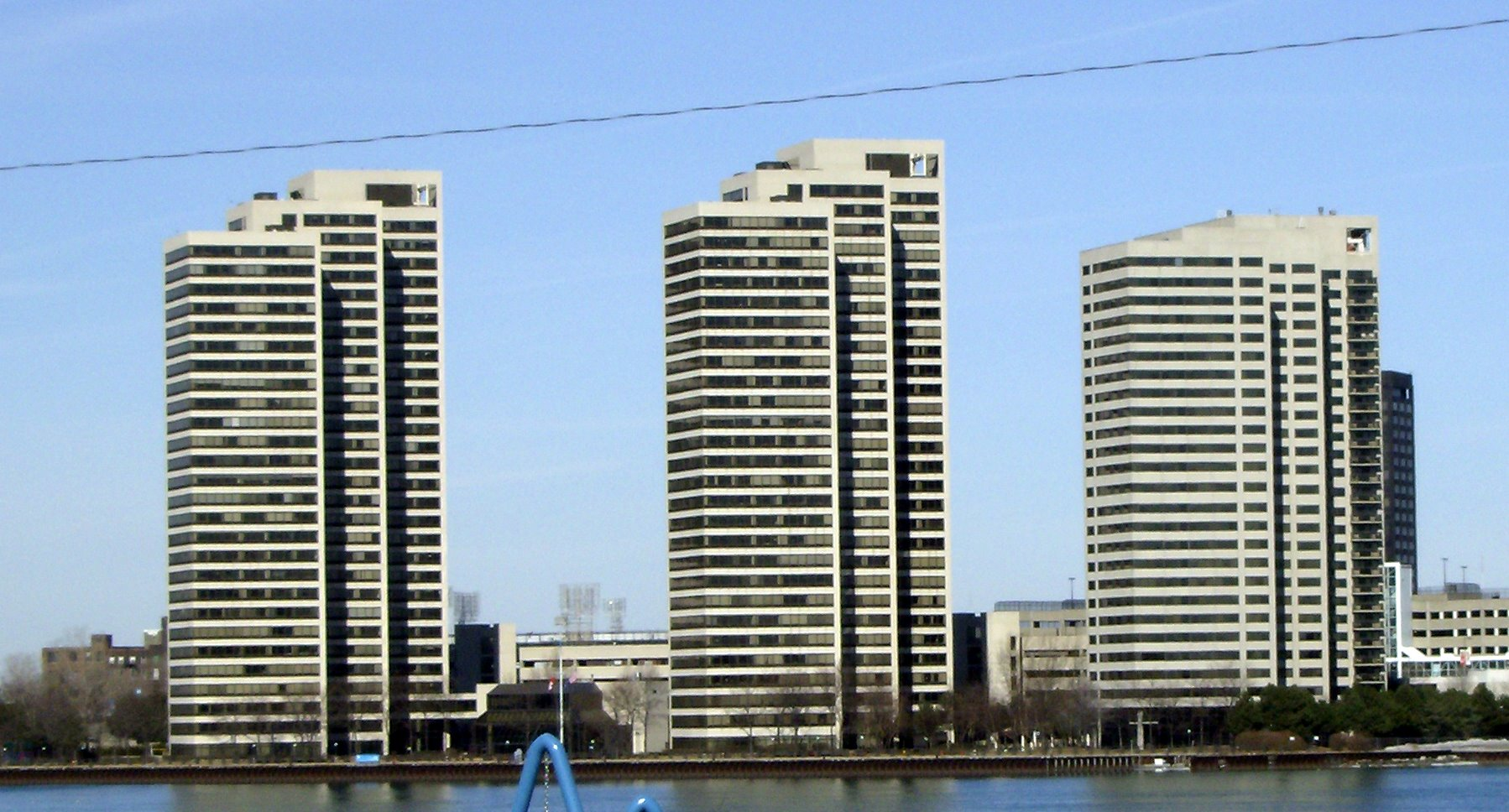
Riverfront Apartments & Condominiums, which have parkland between each building.

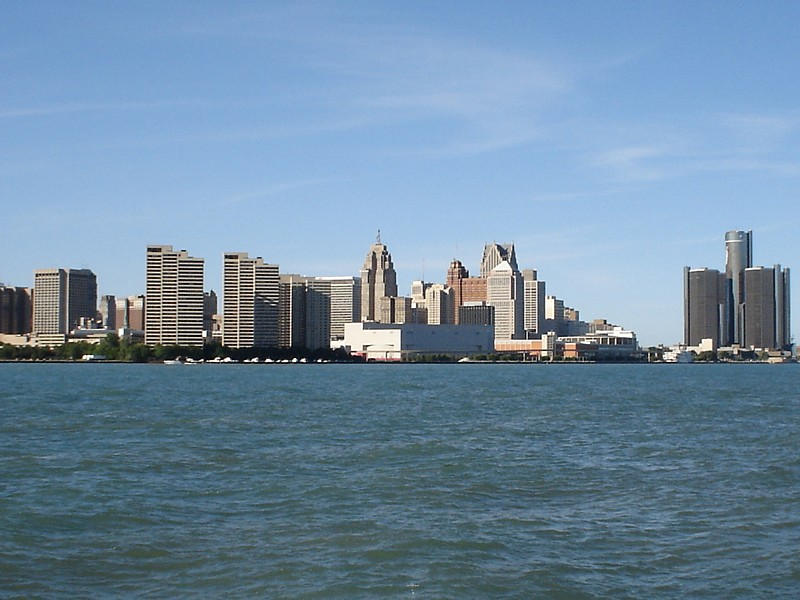
Riverfront Towers (left).

== See also ==
- Alden Park Towers
- International Riverfront
