= Diana Pancioli =

Diana Pancioli Kulisek, born in Detroit, Michigan, is professor of ceramics at Eastern Michigan University and the author of Extruded Ceramics published in 1999 by Sterling Publishing Co., Inc. She is a former head of Production at Pewabic Pottery in Detroit. Among her artistic works are the ceramic arches at the People Mover Cadillac Center Station in Detroit.

== References and further reading ==
- Delicato, Armando (2005). Italians in Detroit (Images of America). Arcadia Publishing. ISBN 0738539856.
- Nawrocki, Dennis Alan and Thomas J. Holleman (1980). Art in Detroit Public Places. Wayne State University Press.
