= Greektown station =

Detroit People Mover station

Greektown
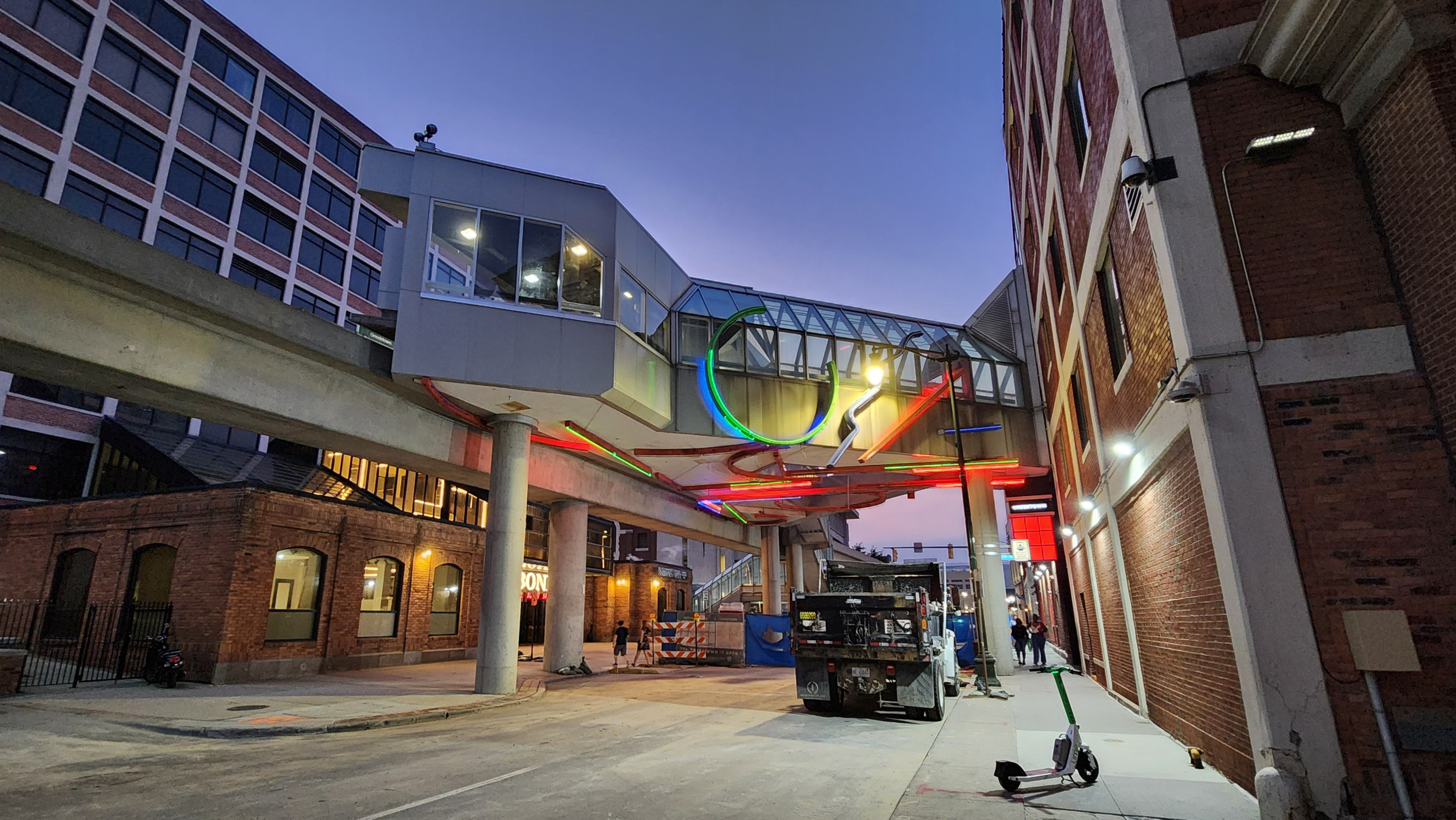

General information
- Location: 1055 Beaubien Boulevard; Detroit, Michigan 48226; United States
- Coordinates: 42°20′05″N 83°02′32″W
- Owner: Detroit Transportation Corporation
- Platforms: 1 side platform
- Tracks: 1

Construction
- Structure type: Elevated
- Accessible: yes

History
- Opened: July 31, 1987
- Former names: MetroPCS-Greektown (2011–12)

Services
Preceding station	Detroit People Mover	Following station
Bricktown One-way operation	Detroit People Mover	Cadillac Center Next counter-clockwise
Location

Greektown station is a Detroit People Mover station in downtown Detroit, Michigan. It is located on Beaubien Street at Monroe Street in the Greektown Historic District, for which it is named. The station's lobby is located inside Hollywood Casino at Greektown, connected to the platform structure by a short skybridge. Its exterior features a large neon sculpture designed by Stephen Antonakos.

The station serves the casino property and the wider Greektown district, and is the nearest People Mover station to Second Baptist Church. In 2014, it was the busiest station on the People Mover, tallying a ridership of 559,048 that year.

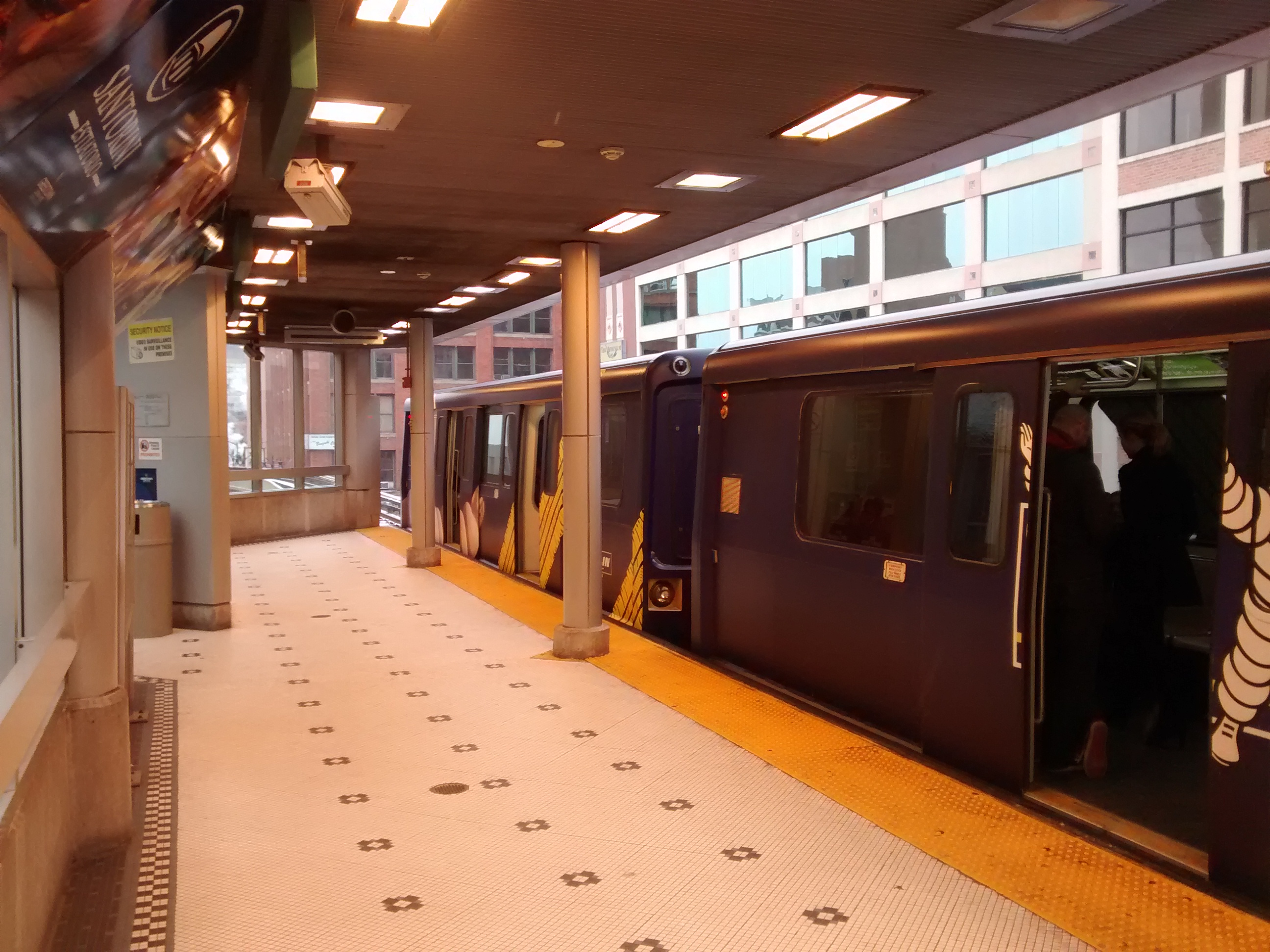
Platform

From September 2011 to September 2012, the station was officially known as MetroPCS-Greektown, under a sponsorship deal with cellular carrier MetroPCS.

As of 2026, the neon sculpture on the exterior is undergoing restoration.

== See also ==
- List of rapid transit systems
- List of United States rapid transit systems by ridership
- Metromover
- Transportation in metropolitan Detroit
