= Cadillac Center station =

Detroit People Mover station

Cadillac Center
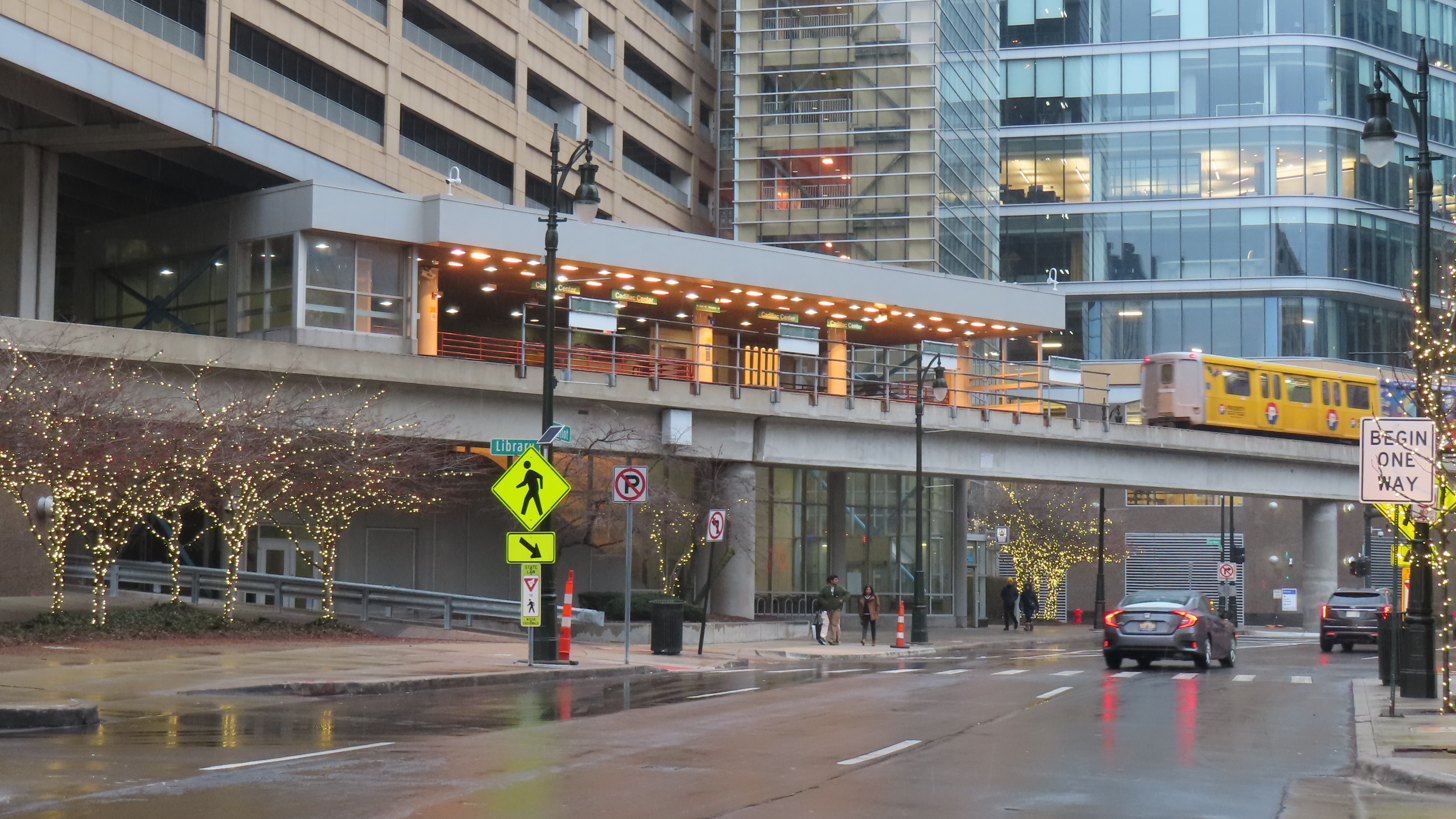

General information
- Location: 110 Gratiot Avenue; Detroit, Michigan 48226; United States
- Coordinates: 42°20′01″N 83°02′46″W
- Owner: Detroit Transportation Corporation
- Platforms: 1 side platform
- Tracks: 1

Construction
- Structure type: Elevated
- Accessible: yes

History
- Opened: July 31, 1987

Services
| Preceding station | Detroit People Mover | Following station |
|---|---|---|
| Greektown One-way operation | Detroit People Mover | Broadway Next counter-clockwise |
Location

Cadillac Center station is a Detroit People Mover station in downtown Detroit, Michigan. It is located at the intersection of Gratiot Avenue and Library Street, beneath the One Campus Martius parking garage. It is named for the Cadillac Center, a shopping center proposed for construction nearby in the 1980s, but never built.

Cadillac Center is the nearest People Mover station to Campus Martius Park, Hudson's Detroit, One Campus Martius, and the Skillman Branch of the Detroit Public Library. It is located one block from the Campus Martius QLine stop, though this is rarely officially signed as a transfer.

== Public art ==
The station's platform and stairwell are adorned with a large tile mosaic, In Honor of Mary Chase Stratton, created by Diana Pancioli of Pewabic Pottery. 26,000 of the tiles used were handmade by Pewabic in the 1930s for a never-built Stroh Brewery Company facility; they were preserved by the Stroh family until the 1980s, when they were donated to the Detroit People Mover Art Commission for use in the station's mosaic.

Also on the stairwell's wall is In Memory of Madame de la Mothe Cadillac, a bronze tablet created by Italian sculptor Carlo Romanelli in 1901, on permanent loan from the Detroit Institute of Arts since the station's opening.

== See also ==
- List of rapid transit systems
- List of United States rapid transit systems by ridership
- Metromover
- Transportation in metropolitan Detroit
