= One Campus Martius =

Building in downtown Detroit, Michigan, United States

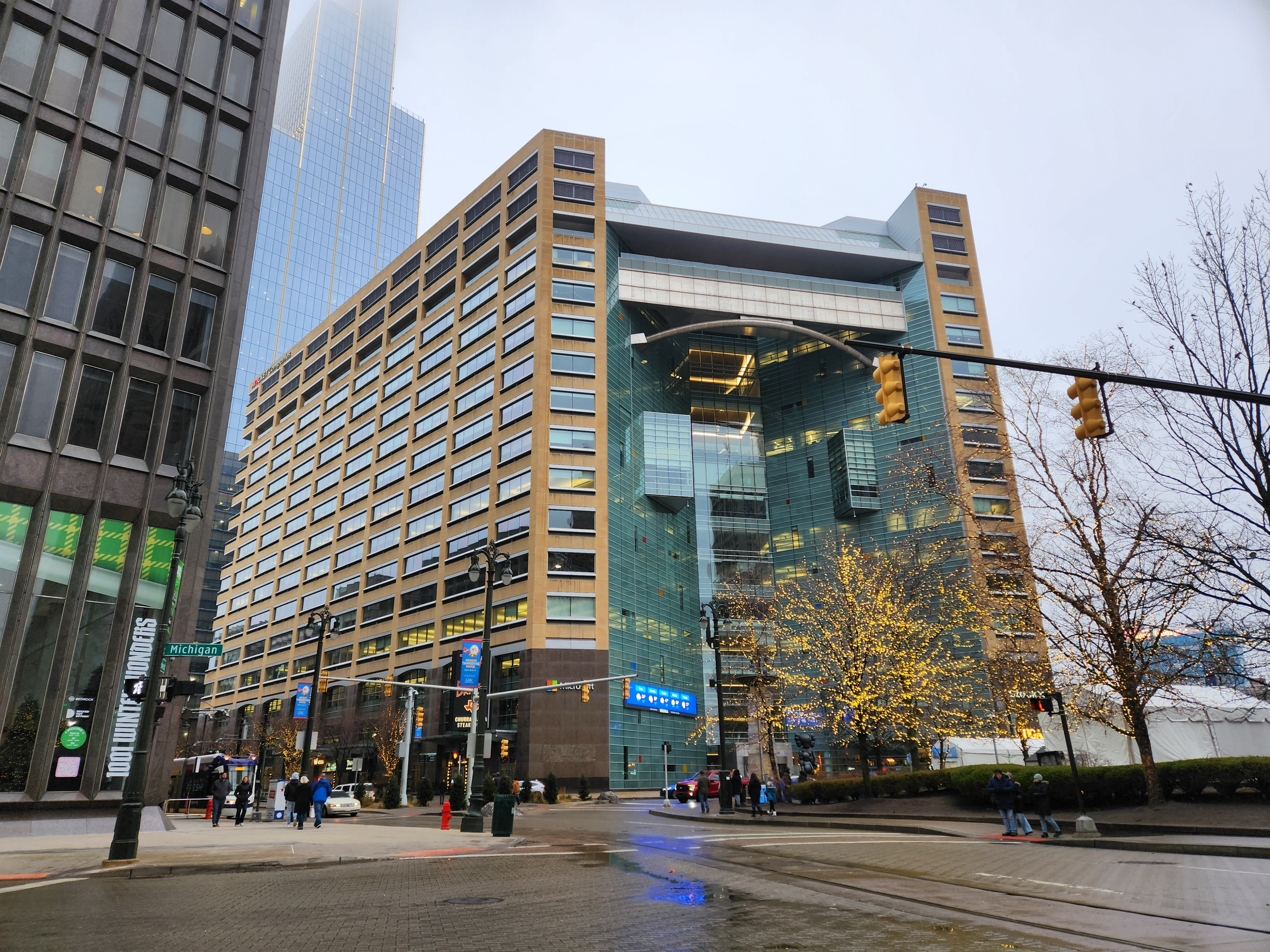
- Former names: Compuware Building (2003–2014)

General information
- Type: office
- Location: 1050 Woodward Ave; Detroit, Michigan, U.S.
- Coordinates: 42.3327°N 83.0464°W
- Construction started: April 12, 2000
- Completed: 2003
- Cost: $350 million (2003)
- Owner: Bedrock Detroit

Height
- Roof: 232 ft (71 m)
- Top floor: 216 ft (66 m)

Technical details
- Floor count: 15
- Floor area: 1,300,000 square feet (120,000 m^{2})
- Lifts/elevators: 24

Design and construction
- Architects: Rossetti Associates; Hamilton Anderson Associates; WET Design
- Main contractor: Walbridge Aldinger

Other information
- Public transit: Cadillac Center; QLine Campus Martius; DDOT 4

Website
- www.bedrockdetroit.com/property/one-campus-martius/

One Campus Martius (formerly and still commonly known as the Compuware Building) is a 15-story office building in downtown Detroit, Michigan, United States. Completed in 2003 as the global headquarters of Compuware, it is currently owned by Bedrock Detroit, and now contains the headquarters of Rocket Mortgage. It stands 232 feet (71 m) tall, and contains 1,300,000 square feet (120,000 m^{2}) of office space.

== History ==
The building stands on the block which contained Kern's, a defunct local department store which had existed on the site in some form since 1900. The last incarnation of the store was demolished in 1966, and the area remained undeveloped greenspace until 1999 when Campus Martius Park began to take shape.

Compuware Corporation announced plans in 1999 to relocate its headquarters to downtown Detroit from the suburb of Farmington Hills. Ground was broken on the new facility on April 12, 2000. The building was constructed at a cost of $350 million, coinciding with the redevelopment of Campus Martius Park. Compuware began moving its employees into the facility in December 2002, consolidating over 4,000 workers from nine facilities across the Detroit area. By August 2003, the building was complete and fully operational, with all employees moved in.

The building includes 60,000 square feet (5,600 m^{2}) of retail space at ground level. Original tenants included a Hard Rock Cafe and a Borders bookstore, which both opened November 10, 2003. Then-mayor Kwame Kilpatrick attended the Hard Rock Cafe's grand opening.

After the Carolina Hurricanes, then owned by Compuware founder and CEO Peter Karmanos, won the Stanley Cup in 2006, a large banner commemorating their victory was raised on the building's exterior, and the Stanley Cup was publicly displayed in the atrium. Borders closed its store in the building in 2009.

In June 2009, Quicken Loans announced that it would relocate its headquarters, with 1,700 employees, from nearby Livonia to the Compuware Building. Quicken had initially planned to construct its own building in downtown Detroit, considering sites including the former site of the J. L. Hudson Department Store (where Hudson's Detroit would eventually be built); it eventually signed a five-year lease of four floors of the Compuware Building, moving in during 2010.

Compuware's presence in the building lessened as the company downsized during the 2010s. Olga's Kitchen opened a location in the building in 2012. Plante Moran opened an office in the building in 2013; it doubled the size of its office in 2016.

In November 2014, Compuware sold the building to a joint venture of Bedrock Real Estate, controlled by Quicken Loans chairman Dan Gilbert, and health insurer Meridian Health for $142 million. With the sale, the building was renamed One Campus Martius in January 2015, and Quicken Loans expanded its space within. Meridian moved 700 employees into the building in spring 2015 with 1,700 employees expected by the end of the year. Compuware publicly committed to keeping its headquarters in the building despite the sale.

A 300,000-square-foot (28,000 m^{2}) expansion was announced by Dan Gilbert in May 2017, adding office space to a previously empty area on the building's north side. Construction began in 2019 and finished in 2020.

Microsoft moved its regional office into the building in 2018. Hard Rock Cafe closed in January 2019.

Compuware was acquired by BMC Software in 2020, and the merged company moved its Detroit office out of One Campus Martius in 2022.

== Description ==
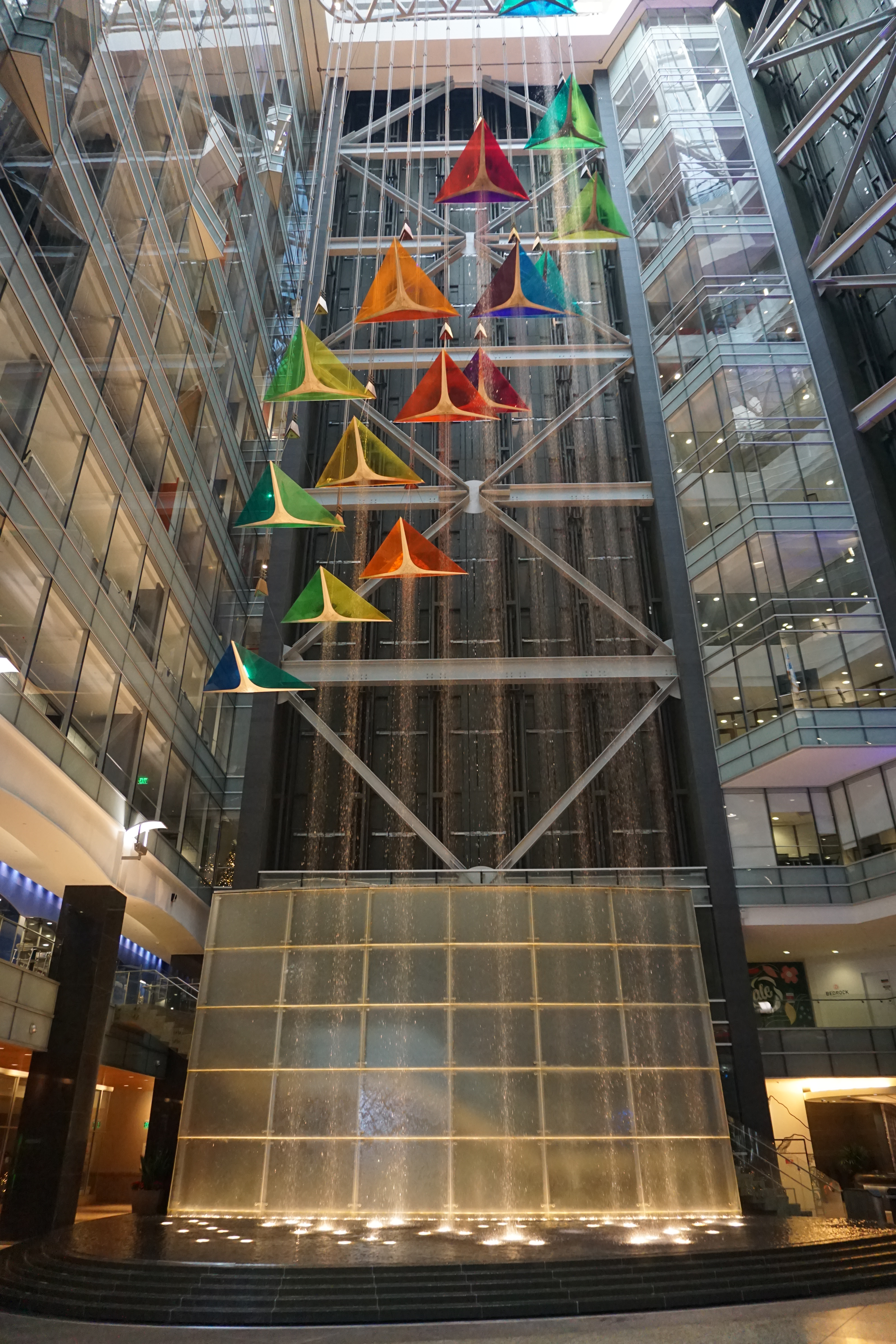
Atrium with waterfall

The building was constructed in the late-modernist architectural style, with a steel frame, and extensive glass, granite and limestone surfaces. At its center is a large atrium, containing an indoor waterfall and glass elevators.

The building has 1,300,000 square feet (120,000 m^{2}) of space. It contains an on-site daycare, a fitness center, a data center, and 55,000 square feet (5,100 m^{2}) of retail space.

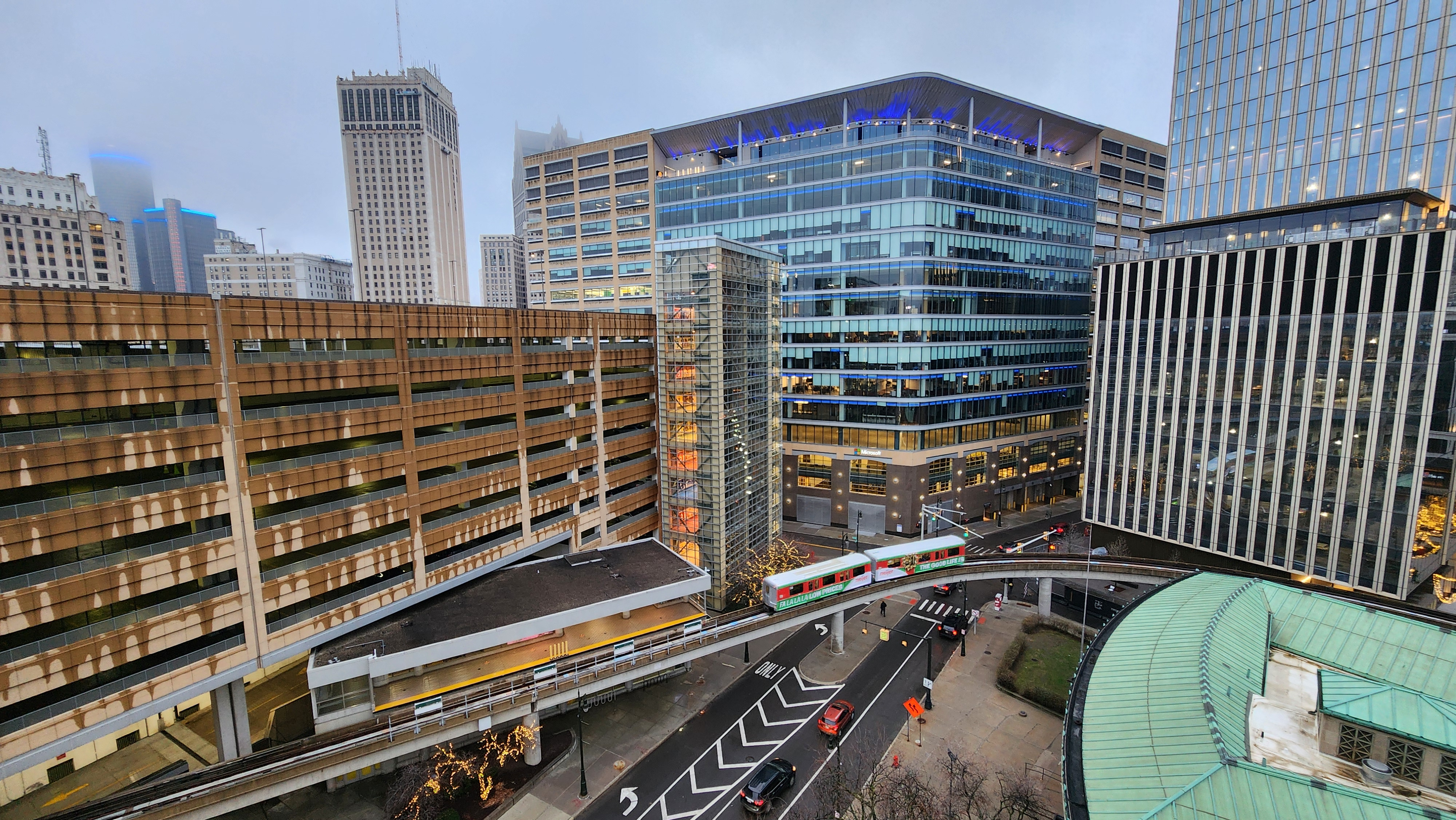
Rear of parking garage (left) and building (center), showing 2019 addition, with Cadillac Center People Mover station at bottom left, and Hudson's Detroit at right

=== Parking garage ===
Northeast of the building is a 12-story parking garage, containing 2,800 to 3,000 parking spaces. The garage was built over and around the Detroit People Mover's Cadillac Center station, and has a direct entrance from the station. It includes more than 20,600 square feet (1,910 m^{2}) of retail space at ground level.
