= Bricktown station =

Detroit People Mover station

Bricktown
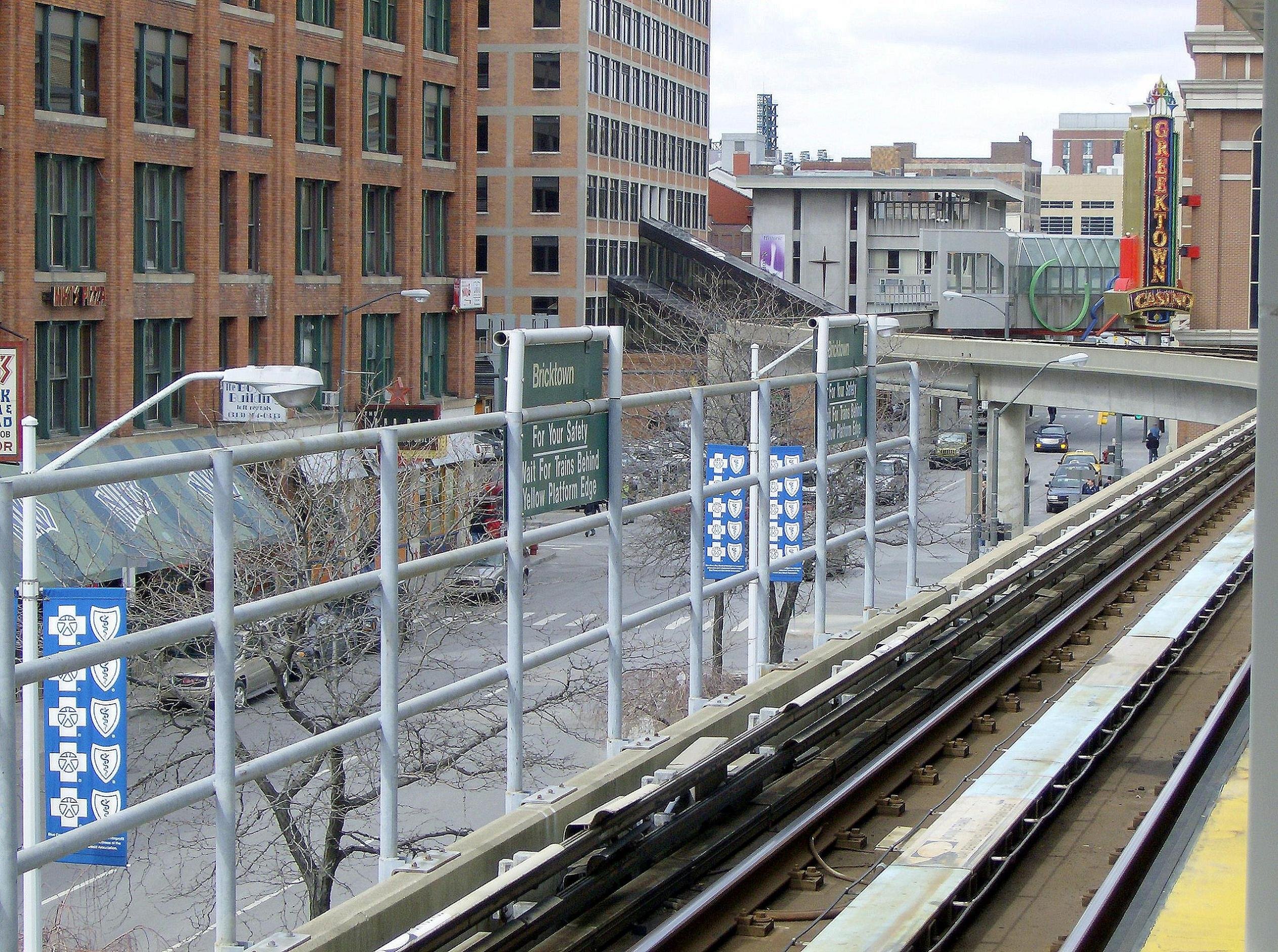

General information
- Location: 710 Beaubien Boulevard; Detroit, Michigan 48226; United States
- Coordinates: 42°20′00″N 83°2′28″W
- Owner: Detroit Transportation Corporation
- Platforms: 1 side platform
- Tracks: 1

Construction
- Accessible: yes

History
- Opened: July 31, 1987

Services
Preceding station	Detroit People Mover	Following station
Renaissance Center One-way operation	Detroit People Mover	Greektown Next counter-clockwise
Location

Bricktown station is a Detroit People Mover station in downtown Detroit, Michigan. It is located on Beaubien Street, just north of Congress Street, in the Bricktown Historic District, for which it is named.

Bricktown is the nearest People Mover station to the Wayne County Building, Saint Andrew's Hall, Cadillac Square, and the Water Board Building. The station is connected to the Blue Cross Blue Shield of Michigan Building, with an employee entrance at the station's rear.

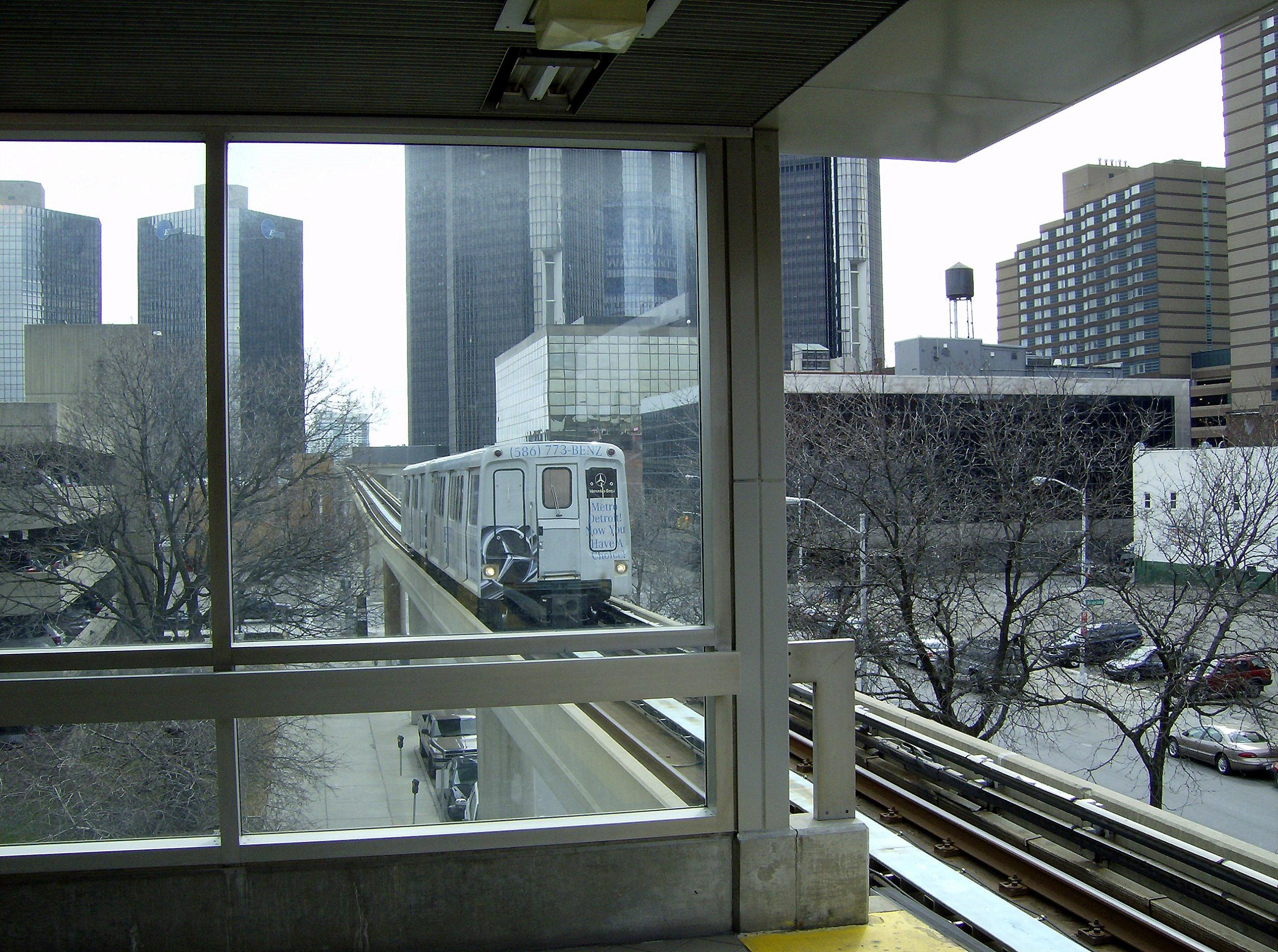
DPM enters Bricktown station

The People Mover shut down temporarily on March 30, 2020, due to decreased ridership amid the COVID-19 pandemic. Following the system's May 2022 restart, the station reopened on November 21, 2022.

== See also ==
- List of rapid transit systems
- List of United States rapid transit systems by ridership
- Metromover
- Transportation in metropolitan Detroit
