= Detroit Festival of the Arts =

- Status: defunct
- Frequency: Annually
- Location: Detroit
- Coordinates: 42°21′33.45″N 83°3′53.27″W
- Country: United States
- Inaugurated: 1986
- Most recent: 2009

The Detroit Festival of the Arts was a three-day arts festival in Detroit, Michigan, held on the second weekend of June. *(Note: It was originally held in September; the festival was only moved to June in the latter few years, after a brief hiatus.) First held in 1986, the Festival featured free musical performances, art showings, activities for children, and local food. It was located in Detroit's cultural center, spanning the Detroit Institute of Arts, the main branch of the Detroit Public Library, and the main Wayne State University campus. A giant sand sculpture had been a fixture of the event since 2004. The theme of the sand sculpture was selected by the sponsors and not by the artists. Official sponsors for the 2007 Festival included DaimlerChrysler, Macy's and the Metro Times.

In 2009, the University Cultural Center Association and Wayne State University produced a new event called "Midsummer Nights in Midtown," which took place every Thursday, Friday, and Saturday in the month of June that year.

== See also ==
- Art on the Move
