= Art on the Move =

Art on the Move is an annual summer arts program held in Detroit, Michigan, launched in 1985.

The organization sponsors temporary art installations during the summer months. These temporary pieces are created by resident artists, who in turn mentor young artists as the public works are executed and erected. Funding for Art on the Move has come from architectural firms in southwestern Michigan, the City of Detroit, and Detroit's Empowerment Zone Development Corporation.

The program has shifted from its original connection with the Detroit People Mover and now provides programs and exhibits for the Detroit Festival of the Arts.
