= Financial District station (Detroit) =

Detroit People Mover station

Financial District
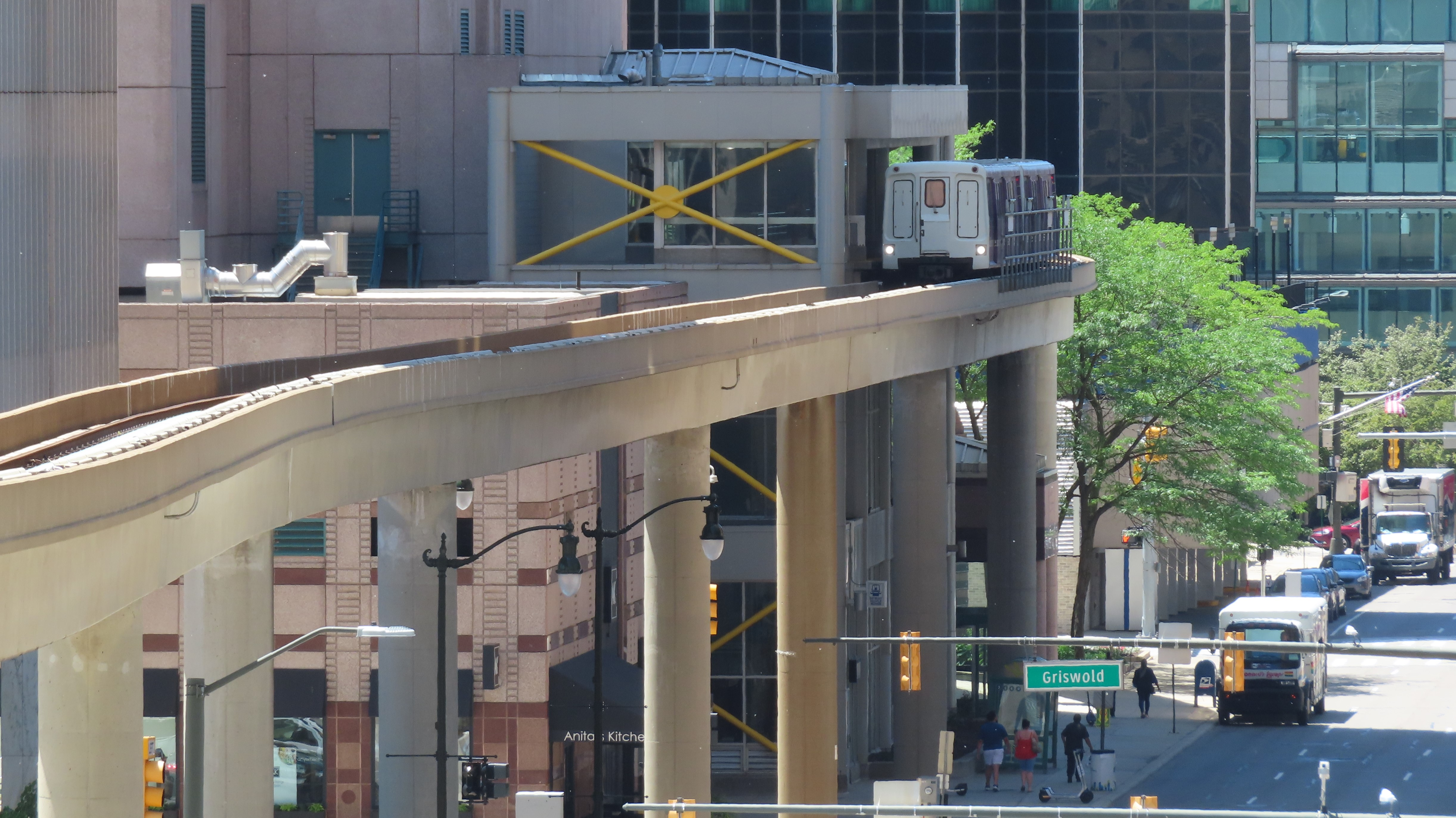
- Financial District station

General information
- Location: 133 W Larned Street; Detroit, Michigan 48226; United States
- Coordinates: 42°19′43″N 83°02′48″W
- Owner: Detroit Transportation Corporation
- Platforms: 1 side platform
- Tracks: 1
- Connections: DDOT 3, 5, 6, 9, 16, 40, 52, 67; SMART FAST Gratiot, Michigan, Woodward; SMART 255, 530, 620, 635, 805, 830, 851

Construction
- Accessible: yes

History
- Opened: July 31, 1987

Passengers
- 2014: 75,819
- Rank: 11 out of 13

Services
Preceding station	Detroit People Mover	Following station
Water Square One-way operation	Detroit People Mover	Millender Center Next counter-clockwise
Location

Financial District station is a Detroit People Mover station in downtown Detroit, Michigan. Located on Larned Street in the city's Financial District, the station is attached to 150 West Jefferson, with direct access from the platform to the building's lobby.

Financial District is the nearest People Mover station to the Guardian Building (which houses the People Mover's administrative offices), Hart Plaza, Spirit Plaza, One Woodward Avenue, and the Buhl, Ford, and Penobscot buildings. It is located roughly two blocks from the Congress Street QLine stop, though this is rarely signed as an official transfer.

== Public art ==
The stairwell and platform walls feature "D" for Detroit, a tile mosaic painted by Joyce Kozloff. The mosaic spans roughly three stories, consisting of 1,200 industrial-grade porcelain tiles, one square foot each, painted and fired at a Kohler plumbing factory in Wisconsin.
