= Carlo Romanelli =

American sculptor (1872–1947)

Carlo Alfred Romanelli (1872–1947) was an Italian sculptor, born in Florence, Italy August 24, 1872 and died August 9, 1947. He came to the United States in 1902, settling in Los Angeles, California. He moved to Detroit, Michigan in the early 1920s. He was the son of Italian sculptor Raffaello Romanelli (1856–1928) who created the 1927 bust of Dante Alighieri on Belle Isle Park in Detroit. Among Carlo Romanelli's Detroit works are the bronze tablet of Cadillac's landing, now at the Cadillac Center People Mover Station downtown, and La Pieta at the entrance of Mt. Elliott Cemetery. Carlo attended the Royal Academy of Art in Italy and studied with his father and sculptor Augusto Rivalta; Rivalta's Detroit statue of Christopher Columbus (1910) is now at Jefferson Avenue and Randolph Street.

Other works by Romanelli completed for Detroit include a bust of Bishop Foley, which was not sited.
