= Gerome Kamrowski =

American artist (1914–2004)

- Kamrowski in his studio, frontispiece of his 1983 retrospective catalogue
- Born: January 29, 1914; Warren, Minnesota, U.S.
- Died: March 27, 2004 (aged 90); Ann Arbor, Michigan, U.S.
- Movement: surrealism, abstract expressionism
- Spouses: Maryanna Fargione; Edith Dines; Mary Jane Dodman
- Children: 1
- Website: geromekamrowski.org

Gerome Kamrowski (January 29, 1914 – March 27, 2004) was an American visual artist and pioneer in the surrealist and abstract expressionist Movements in the United States.

== Early life and education ==
Gerome Kamrowski was born in Warren, Minnesota, on January 19, 1914. In 1932 he enrolled in the Saint Paul School of Art (now Minnesota Museum of American Art - MMAA), where he studied with Leroy Turner, and Cameron Booth. Both Turner and Booth had been students of Hans Hofmann, and were also associated with the Abstraction-Création group in Paris. It was from these peers that Kamrowski was introduced to a "kind of expressionist cubism." In 1933 Kamrowski was awarded a scholarship to the Art Students League, where he would study in New York under Hans Hofmann. Unfortunately immigration problems had prevented Hofmann from assuming his post. Nevertheless, Kamrowski decided to remain in New York for a short time, to attend classes taught by George Grosz. After a few weeks, he returned to St. Paul, and found a position in the mural painting division of the Minnesota FAP/WPA (Works Progress Administration). In 1936 he contributed “Synthetic Cubist Style” frescoes in the Northrup Auditorium of the University of Minnesota.

In 1937 Kamrowski went to Chicago to study under László Moholy-Nagy and Alexander Archipenko at the New Bauhaus (now Illinois Institute of Technology's Institute of Design). There he was exposed to new and interesting ideas regarding the role of nature in art and the "geometric basis of natural form".

== New York years ==
In 1938 Kamrowski received a Guggenheim fellowship to attend Hans Hofmann's summer school in Provincetown, Massachusetts. He then relocated to New York where he met William Baziotes. Together they shared a fascination in Surrealist automatic writing, and both artists explored its possibilities in their paintings. Kamrowski was particularly drawn to Surrealism's fundamental appeal of intuition over intellect. He was interested seeking a process that "binds all things together...a kind of cosmic rhythm".

Throughout the late 1930s and early 1940s while living in New York, Kamrowski became an integral part of the emerging surrealists. In 1942, the artist Roberto Matta attempted to form a group of artists to investigate new applications for Surrealist methods. He invited Kamrowski, along with William Baziotes, Jackson Pollock, Peter Busa, and Robert Motherwell to join. Like Kamrowski, the others were more interested in process than in subject matter—the foundation of Matta's art—and the group soon dissolved. But no matter how short lived the collaboration was, this group was the kernel of the open-ended movement that was referred to as abstract surrealism and would over time prove to be the beginnings of abstract expressionism.

It was during this time, the winter of 1939/1940, that an amazing collaboration was made. Kamrowski and two of his contemporaries, William Baziotes and Jackson Pollock, came together and began to paint. The description of this historic event is described as follows in "Pollock" by Ellen G. Landau: "For a number of years, Kamrowski had been involved with Surrealist image-coaxing techniques. In a letter to B.H. Friedman, Kamrowski recalled that one day he, Pollock, and Baziotes were fooling around' with quart-cans of lacquer paint. Baziotes asked if he could use some 'to show Pollock how the paint could be spun around.' He then looked around the room for something to work on, and a canvas that Kamrowski had 'been pouring paint on and was not going well' was handy, so Baziotes began to throw and drip' white paint on it. He next gave the dripping palette knife to Jackson, who with his intense concentration' started flipping the paint with abandon. ' According to Kamrowski, after all had a chance to play, Baziotes identified the spiral forms he had created as 'birds' nests, ' but Pollock refused to interpret his spots." This painting was a pivotal work, showing the transition from, and fusion of, Surrealism to Action Painting and Abstract Expressionism.

In 1947, Kamrowski was invited to the Surrealist Exhibition in Paris by Surrealist leader André Breton. Breton said of him, "Of all the young painters whose evolution I have been able to follow in New York during the last years of the war, Gerome Kamrowski is the one who has impressed me far the most by reason of the "quality" and sustained character of his research. Among all the newcomers there, he was the only one...tunnelling in a new direction..."

== Michigan years ==
In the 1940s Kamrowski relocated to Ann Arbor, Michigan in order to teach at the University of Michigan School of Art. It was a career that would span thirty-eight years, and would encourage countless others to push their artistic boundaries. Professor Jon Rush, at the University's School of Art and Design, stated: "As a teacher, Professor Kamrowski admonished his students to experiment and push the boundaries of their art. He urged them to be unafraid of failure and consider it a natural part of the creative process," and says "Above all, he stressed the importance of finding one's own path and that it would take hard work and dedication to achieve that. He was a natural teacher who related well to students because he himself never stopped being one."

Teaching became a second passion. Over the years, Kamrowski's energy and drive never faltered, and his style continued to evolve dynamically from the abstract intellectual exercises of the past to colorful 3-D pieces often made of glass, cement, and random found objects. He worked every day and exhibited steadily in Michigan and elsewhere. He once said, "Michigan has been good to me, don't misunderstand me, but on the other hand I have a certain amount of contempt for it."

He cited architects Antoni Gaudi and Simon Rodia as inspirations.

== Work ==
Kamrowski created 2 Venetian glass mosaics for the Joe Louis Arena Station of the Detroit People Mover elevated train. His work is in the collections of the Museum of Modern Art,Metropolitan Museum of Art,Whitney Museum,Minneapolis Institute of Art,Smithsonian American Art Museum,The Phillips Collection,Zimmerli Art Museum at Rutgers University,Israel Museum,Los Angeles County Museum of Art,Weisman Art Museum,Detroit Institute of Arts,Weatherspoon Art Museum,Worcester Art Museum,Flint Institute of Arts, and University of Michigan Museum of Art.

== Personal life ==
His first wife was Maryanna Fargione, with whom he had a son, Felix. His second wife was Edith Dines and his third wife was Mary Jane Dodman. He died at his home in Ann Arbor, Michigan on March 27, 2004. He was 90 years old.
