= Stephen Antonakos =

American sculptor (1926–2013)

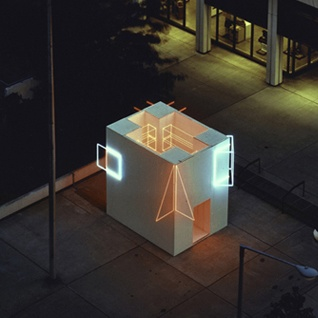
The Room by Stephen Antonakos, 1974

Stephen Antonakos (Greek: Στυλιανός Αντωνάκος; November 1, 1926 in Agios Nikolaos, Laconia, Greece – August 17, 2013 in New York City) was a Greek-American sculptor most well known for his abstract sculptures often incorporating neon.

== Life and works ==
Antonakos moved with his family from Greece to the United States at the age of 4 and was raised in the Brooklyn, New York neighborhood of Bay Ridge. He graduated from Brooklyn Community College. He has taught at Yale, the University of North Carolina and Brooklyn College.

Antonakos's work has been included in several important international exhibitions including Documenta 6 in 1977 in Kassel, Germany and he represented Greece at the Venice Biennale in 1997. His art is included in major international collections including the Metropolitan Museum of Art, The Museum of Modern Art, The Whitney Museum of American Art, The Solomon R. Guggenheim Museum, all in New York City, The National Gallery of Art in Washington D.C., The Hyde Collection in Glens Falls, NY, and the National Museum of Contemporary Art, Athens. Among his public commissions were pieces for airports in Atlanta, Milwaukee, and Bari, Italy and two high-profile works in New York City, "Neon for 42nd Street" (since taken down) and the "59th street piece- Neon for the 59th street transfer station" (still standing). His large-scale neon installation, Proscenium (2000), was on view from January 28-June 24, 2018, at the Neuberger Museum of Art, SUNY Purchase.

Antonakos was a member of the National Academy of Design and received their lifetime achievement award in 2011.

"I feel that everyone should have the opportunity to see and experience… art selected without any compromises. I believe that the best is the only thing worth doing, and that only sometimes what may be difficult to understand can, in the end, be the most rewarding." -Stephen Antonakos on Neons for Back Bay/South End Station

== Selected exhibitions ==
- 2020: A Space Full of Drawings and a Drawing in Space, Daniel Marzona, Berlin, Germany
- 2017: documenta 14, Kassel, Germany
- 2012: Neon, la materia luminosa dell’arte, MACRO Museo d’Arte Contemporanea di Roma, Rome, Italy
- 2009: In and Out of Amsterdam: art & project, Museum of Modern Art, New York, NY, USA
- 2007: The Abstract Impulse: Fifty Years of Abstraction at the National Academy 1956 – 2006, National Academy Museum and School, NY, USA
- 2005: Drawings, Neue Nationalgalerie, Berlin, Germany
- 2002: Adventure of Medias; Sound, Light, and Image, Kamakura Gallery, Kanagawa, Japan
- 2002: Probation Area: Arte Povera, Conceptual Art, Minimal Art, Land Art: The Marzona Collection, Hamburger Bahnhof, Berlin, Germany
- 2001: Im Spiegel der Freiheit: Giannis Tsarouchis, Stephen Antonakos, George Hadjimichalis, Schirn Kunsthalle Frankfurt Frankfurt am Main, Curator: Hellmut Seemann
- 2000: (e così via) (and so on): 99 Artist from the Marzona Collection: arte povera, minimal art, land art, Galleria Comunale d'Arte Contemporanea, Rome, Italy
- 1999: Antonakos: „Welcome“ and „Chapel for P.S. 1“, MoMA PS1, New York City
- 1997: Chapel of the Heavenly Ladder, 47th International Art Exhibition Venice Biennale, Biennale di Venezia, Venice, Italy
- 1990: Neons For Back Bay Station
- 1989: ARTEC, 1st International Biennale, Nagoya, Japan
- 1987: Mathematik in der Kunst der Letzten Dreissig Jahre, Wilhelm-Hack-Museum, Ludwigshafen am Rhein, Curator: Bernhard Holedzek
- 1985 Neon For the Rose Art Museum. Exterior Rose Art Museum at Brandeis University
- 1977: documenta 6, Kassel, Curator: Manfred Schneckenburger
- 1975: USA Zeichnungen 3, Schloss Morsbroich, Leverkusen, Curator: Rolf Wedewer und Rolf Ricke
- 1975: Eight Artists, Eight Attitudes, Eight Greeks, Institute of Contemporary Arts, London, UK
- 1973: Works in Spaces, San Francisco Museum of Modern Art, San Francisco, CA, USA
- 1973: American Drawings, Whitney Museum of American Art, New York City, Curator: Elke M. Solomon
- 1970: Preliminary Drawings, Museum of Modern Art, New York, NY, USA
- 1966: Kunst-Light-Kunst, Van Abbemuseum, Eindhoven, Curator: Jean Leering
