= Tile art =

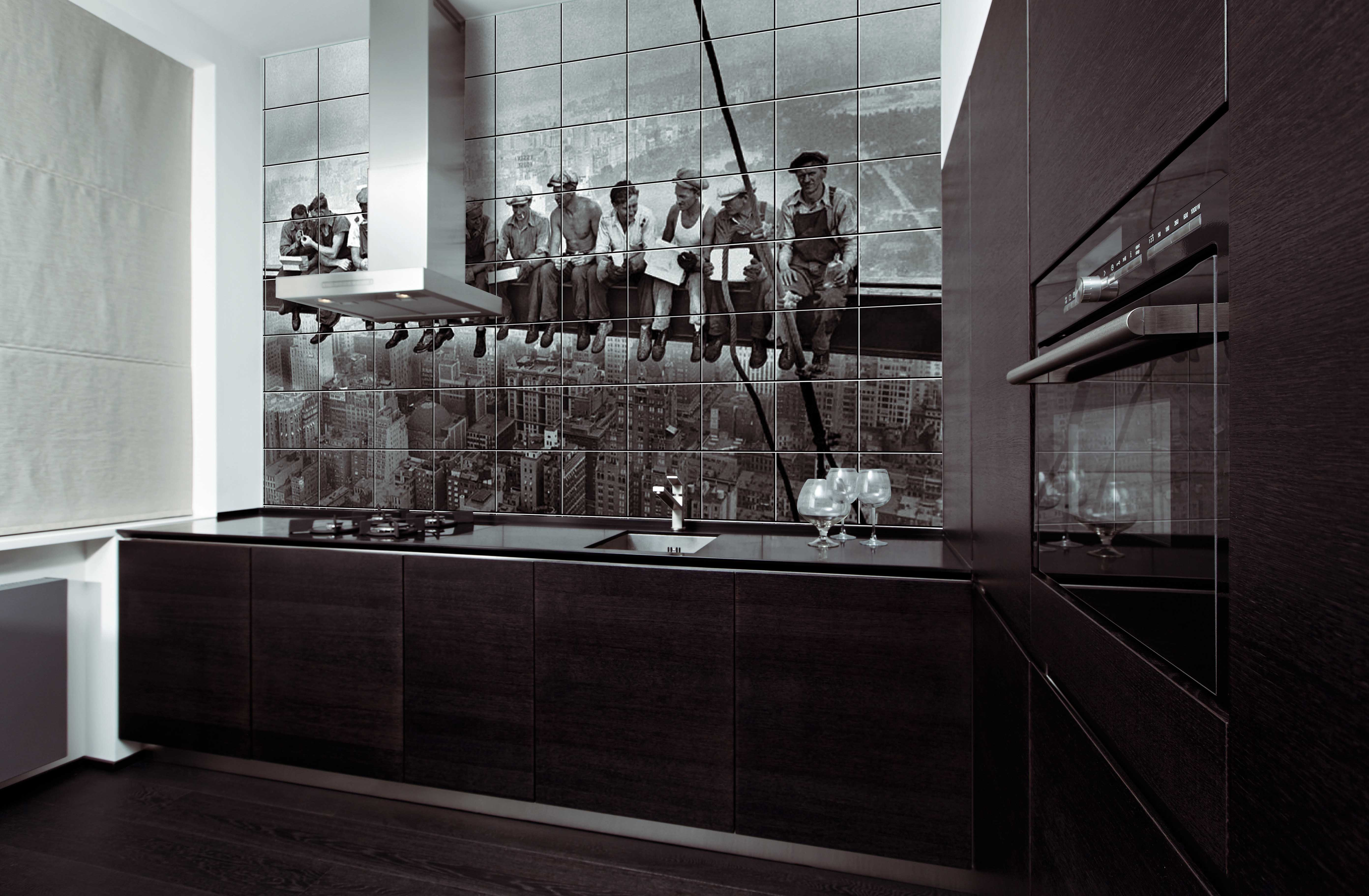
Printed Tile Art

Tile art is a small arrangement of tiles, or in some cases a single tile, with a painted pattern or image on top. Tile art includes other forms of tile-based art, such as mosaics, micromosaics, and stained glass.

Unlike mosaics, tile art can include larger pieces of tiles that are pre-decorated. While mosaics use pieces of tesserae or another material to construct a pattern from small components, other methods, such as engraving, carving, and molding may be used in tile art. While mosaics are considered a type of tile art, there are many other forms that are also considered tile art.

== Types of tile art ==
Many types of art can be considered tile art. Different types of tile art have different features and can be created in different mediums, such as ceramic, porcelain, glass tiles, and other tiled mediums.

Listed below are some of the different types of artwork considered tile art:

- Mosaics
- Ceramic tiles
- Stained glass
- Porcelain tiles
- Photo tiles
- Tile murals
- Engraving on a tile

== Modern tile art ==
=== Design ===
Many modern tile art designs are based on abstract and pattern-based designs. These are non-representational, unlike older tile art formats, such as mosaics, which were often portraits or other representational forms of artwork. The design on a piece of tile art may be used as decoration, but may also represent an idea, philosophy or pose a historical, religious or social significance.

An example of such non-representational art is a set of tiles integrated into an interior or exterior design. The design of the tile art is often based on the theme of the surrounding design. As tiles are built into the surrounding, they can be installed seamlessly into the surrounding area.

=== Usage ===
Modern tile art serves many purposes. The general definition of tile art includes many mediums and many different designs achieved by various techniques and media. For example, tile art may be used to decorate one's home, but must also be practical as a wall or flooring element, as the tiles in an interior design could be replaced by tile art.

Tile art can also be used in the garden to complement the colors in the plants and foliage.

Using modern printing technology, images can be digitally printed onto a set of tiles or a tile. This can be used in lieu of hanging paintings or using wallpaper.

== Creation technique ==
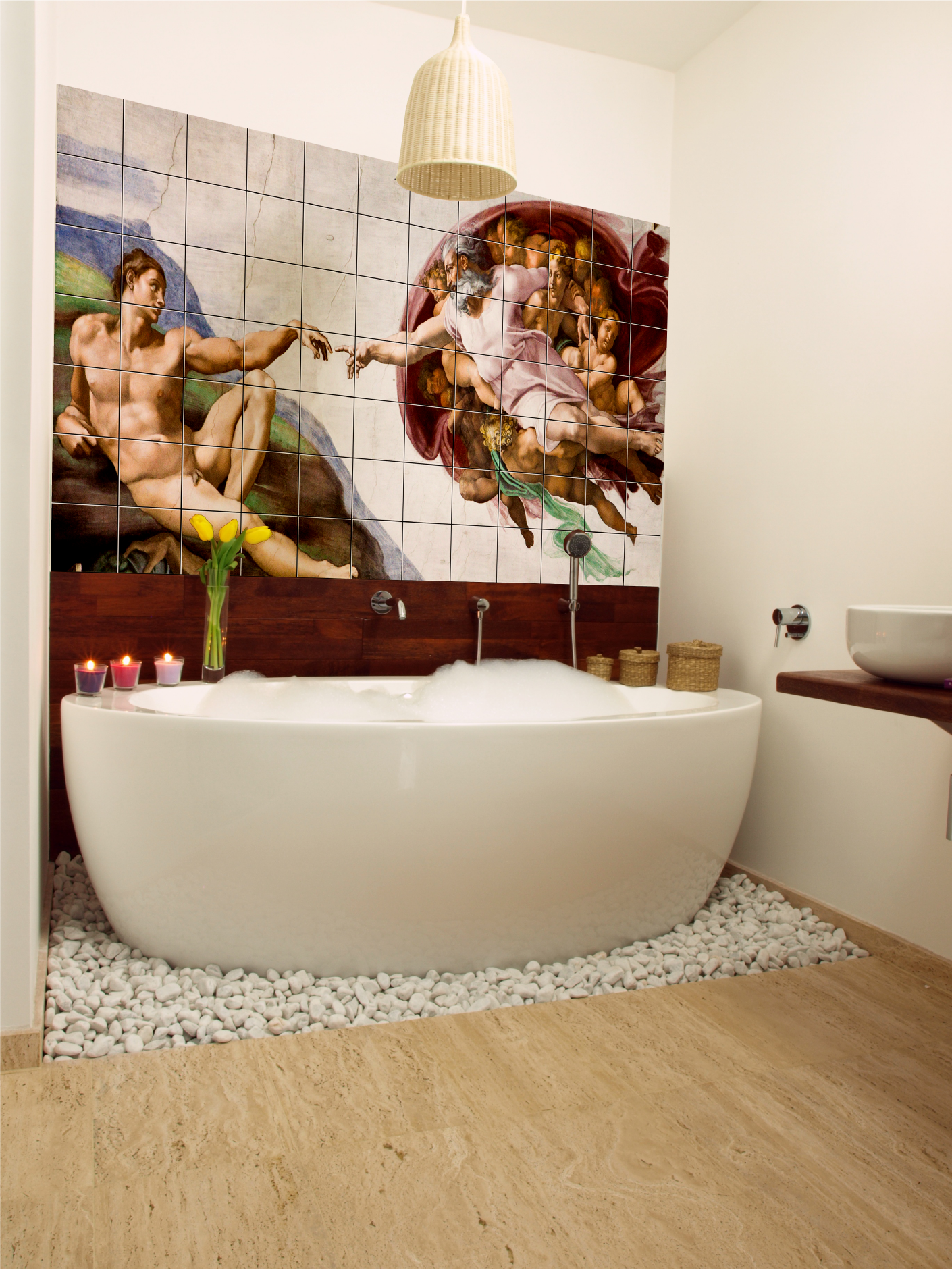
Art on tiles

The many different types of tile artwork mean that there are many different methods of creating a piece of tile artwork.

- Engraving
- Carving
- Painting
- Molding
- Printing
- Trimming
- Tile staining

== See also ==
- Mosaic
- Ceramic
- Tile
- St Giles' Cathedral
- Siena Cathedral
