= Grand Park Centre =

Building in Detroit

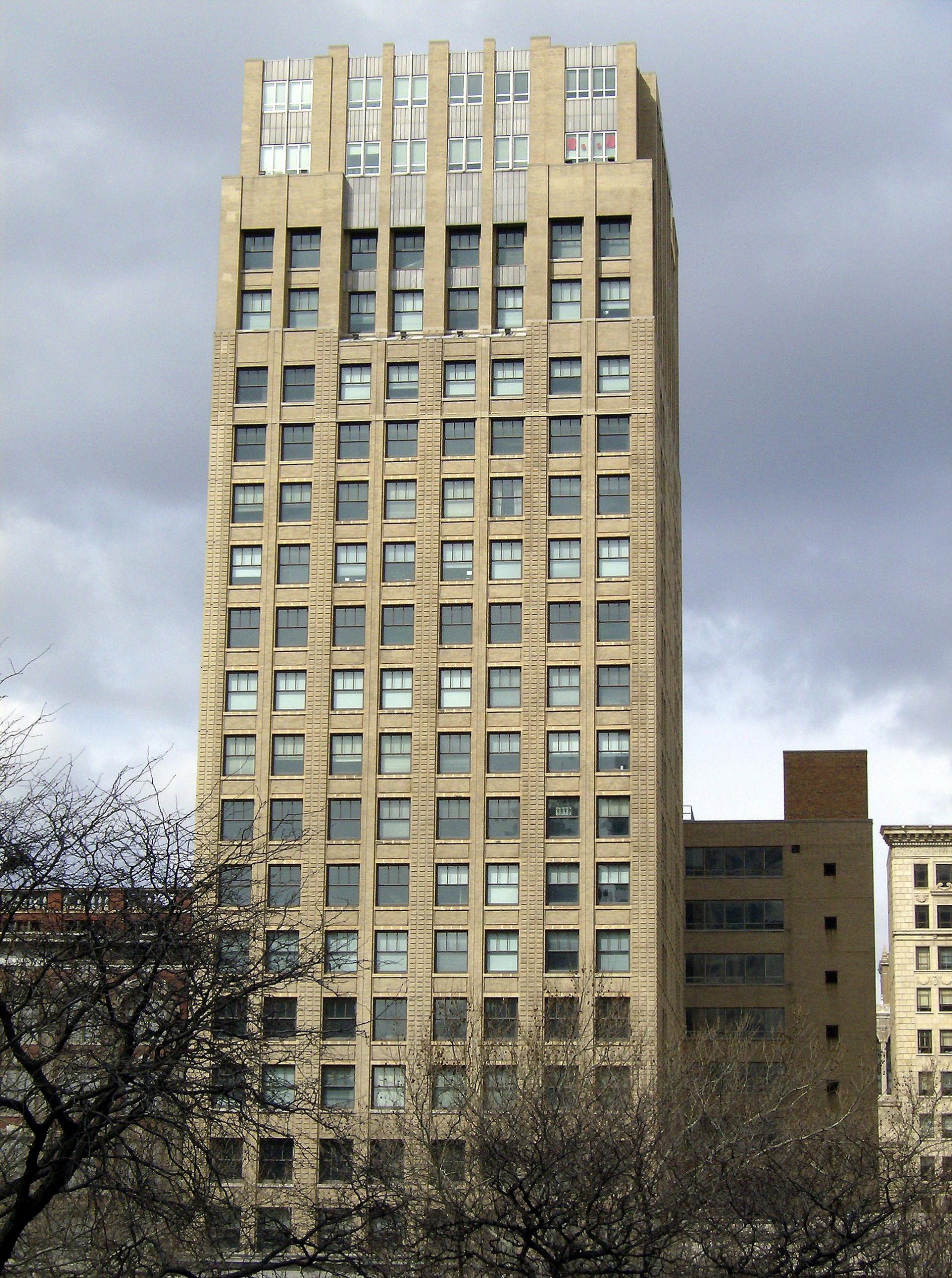
- Interactive map of the Grand Park Centre area

General information
- Type: office
- Location: 28 West Adams; Detroit, Michigan, U.S.
- Coordinates: 42.33687°N 83.05136°W
- Completed: 1922

Height
- Roof: 250 ft (76 m)

Technical details
- Floor count: 19

Design and construction
- Architects: Giaver & Dinkelberg; Paul Kamper

Other information
- Public transit: Grand Circus Park; Grand Circus; SMART FAST Woodward 461, 462; DDOT 4 D2A2

Grand Park Centre, also known as the Michigan Mutual Building, is a high-rise office building in downtown Detroit, Michigan, located at 28 West Adams Avenue, at the corner of Adams Avenue West and Woodward Avenue, standing across from Grand Circus Park in the Foxtown neighbourhood. Nearby buildings and attractions are Grand Circus Park, Comerica Park, Ford Field, the Dime Building, and Campus Martius Park. The building is a part of the Michigan Mutual Liability Company Complex, with the Michigan Mutual Liability Annex. The building is located in the Foxtown neighborhood of Detroit.

Grand Park Centre was constructed in 1922 as an eighteen-story office building. It was originally constructed as the headquarters for Strohs Brewery Company, and as such, had a beer garden on the roof. An artist's rendering of the building, as it originally was designed, including the rooftop beer garden, hangs in the building's management office. The first floor has limited retail space and the remaining floors are utilized as office space. The building had a cafeteria in the lower level, decorated with ornate plaster, which is currently used for storage. The building was designed in the Chicago School architectural style with a steel and concrete structural system that allowed for numerous large window openings. The non-load-bearing exterior walls consist of three wythes of brick masonry. The east facade abuts a two-story building. The west wall is solid masonry for the bottom seven floors as a result of the six-story Fine Arts Building (Adams Theater), which stood on the adjacent site until 2009, when it was demolished, leaving only the Adams Avenue facade.

== Renovations ==
In the 1950s, in an effort to both modernize the building and increase leaseable space, the original cornice and beer garden were removed and two additional floors were added to the tower, which are clad with brick masonry and stainless steel. At the same time, a nine-story Annex building, which contains one parking level and seven office floors above grade and two parking levels below grade, was added. The Annex is clad with brick masonry. The north and south facades have both original and replacement strip windows. The east and west facades are solid masonry. The Tower and Annex are connected by an enclosed walkway at floors three through ten.

After being purchased by Capozzoli Advisory in 2000, the building was subsequently renovated at a cost of $7 million by Barton Malow Company.
