= Algerism =

Algerism may refer to:

- Horatio Alger (1832–1899), an American writer of young adult novels characterized by the "rags-to-riches" narrative
- Russell A. Alger (1836–1907), U.S. Secretary of War criticised for inadequate preparation and inefficient operation of the department during the Spanish–American War
