= Russell A. Alger =

American politician (1836–1907)

Russell Alger
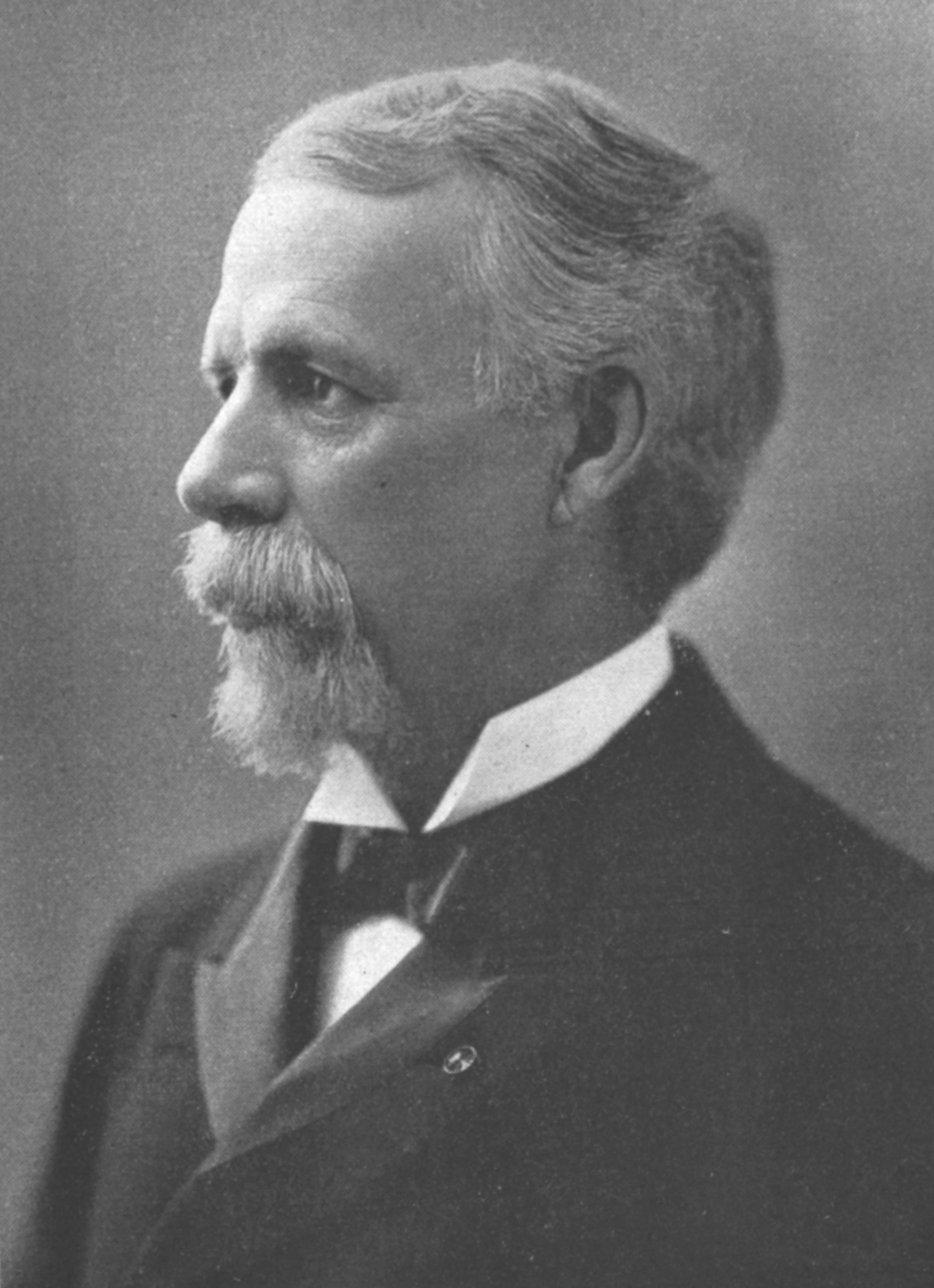

United States Senator from Michigan
- In office September 27, 1902 – January 24, 1907
- Preceded by: James McMillan
- Succeeded by: William Smith

40th United States Secretary of War
- In office March 5, 1897 – August 1, 1899
- President: William McKinley
- Preceded by: Daniel S. Lamont
- Succeeded by: Elihu Root

20th Governor of Michigan
- In office January 1, 1885 – January 1, 1887
- Lieutenant: Archibald Buttars
- Preceded by: Josiah Begole
- Succeeded by: Cyrus G. Luce

Personal details
- Born: Russell Alexander Alger; February 27, 1836 Lafayette Township, Ohio, U.S.
- Died: January 24, 1907 (aged 70) Washington, D.C., U.S.
- Party: Republican
- Spouse: Annette Huldana Squire Henry (m. 1861)
- Children: 6

Military service
- Allegiance: United States • Union
- Branch/service: United States Army • Union Army
- Years of service: 1861–1864
- Rank: Colonel; Brevet Major General
- Commands: 5th Michigan Cavalry Regiment
- Battles/wars: American Civil War; Battle of Booneville; Valley campaigns of 1864; Battle of Trevilian Station

Russell Alexander Alger (/ˌældʒər/ AL-jər; February 27, 1836 – January 24, 1907) was an American politician and businessman. He served as the 20th governor of Michigan, U.S. Senator, and U.S. Secretary of War. Impoverished as a child, Alger accumulated wealth throughout his life and died a respected businessman. He was at various points an army officer, a financier, lumber baron, and railroad owner. He was supposedly a distant relation of author Horatio Alger, who often wrote about such "rags to riches" tales.

== Early life and career ==
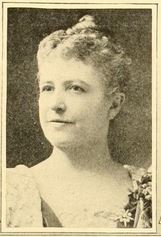
Annette Huldana Squire Henry

Russell Alexander Alger was born on February 27, 1836, in Lafayette Township, Medina County, Ohio. His parents were Russell and Caroline Alger (née Moulton). Hailing from a New England family, his ancestors came from England to Massachusetts in 1759.

His parents died in 1848, leaving Russell the oldest of three orphaned children, without money and with a brother and sister to care for and support. He had been accustomed to working for the neighbors for a small quantity of provisions or a few pennies a day even before the death of his parents, who were very poor.

He now found homes for his brother and sister and secured work for himself on a farm, his remuneration being his board, clothes and the privilege of attending school three months out of the year. He attended Richfield Academy in Richfield, Summit County, Ohio, and taught country school for two winters.

He studied law in Akron, Ohio, and was admitted to the bar in March 1859. He first began to practice law in Cleveland. In 1860, he moved to Grand Rapids, Michigan, and engaged in the lumber business.

== Civil War ==
Alger enlisted as a private soldier in the American Civil War on September 2, 1861. He was commissioned and served as a captain and major in the 2nd Michigan Cavalry Regiment. In three years, he served in 66 different battles and skirmishes.

On July 1, 1862, at the Battle of Booneville, Alger attacked the enemy's rear with ninety men. He was wounded and taken prisoner, but escaped the same day. The Confederate forces were soundly defeated.

On October 16, he was made lieutenant colonel of the 6th Michigan Cavalry.

On February 28, 1863, he was promoted to colonel of the 5th Michigan Cavalry. His command was the first to enter Gettysburg on June 28. Alger was personally mentioned in the report of General George Armstrong Custer on cavalry operations there.

Alger was considered a military strategist and surveyed Union supplies with President Lincoln.

Alger participated in General Sheridan's Valley Campaigns of 1864 in Virginia. On June 11, 1864, at Trevilian Station, he captured a large force of Confederates with a brilliant cavalry charge.

On July 8, 1864, Alger was severely wounded pursuing the enemy at Boonesborough, Maryland.

Alger resigned from the army on September 20, 1864. On January 13, 1866, President Andrew Johnson nominated Alger for the award of the grade of brevet brigadier general of volunteers to rank from June 11, 1865, and the U.S. Senate confirmed the award on March 12, 1866. On February 28, 1867, President Johnson nominated Alger for the award of the grade of brevet major general of volunteers to rank from June 11, 1865, and the U.S. Senate confirmed the award on March 2, 1867.

In 1868, he was elected the first commander of the Michigan department of the Grand Army of the Republic. In 1889, he became the Grand Army's National Commander-in-Chief. He was also a member of the Michigan Commandery of the Military Order of the Loyal Legion of the United States.

== Lumber baron ==
After the Civil War, Alger settled in Detroit as head of Alger, Smith & Company and the Manistique Lumbering Company. His holdings included a great pine forest on Lake Huron covering over 100 square miles (260 km^{2}) and producing more than 75,000,000 board feet (180,000 m^{3}) of lumber per annum.

In order to transport the lumber, Alger led his company to create the Detroit, Bay City and Alpena Railroad, of which Alger served as president.

After clear cutting forests in the lower peninsula, his lumber companies acquired land in the Upper Peninsula of Michigan including Kingston Plains, just south of the Pictured Rocks National Lakeshore. These bleak stump plains have resisted 90 years of reforestation efforts. Alger made a fortune logging the area which he used to propel himself to governor of Michigan.

At the turn of the 20th century, he and Florida landowner Martin Sullivan established the Alger-Sullivan Lumber Company, which milled lumber in Foshee, Alabama, and Century, Florida.

== Political activism ==
Alger was active in politics as a Republican. In 1866, he was a delegate to the party's Wayne County convention and its state convention. In the late 1860s, Alger was a leader of the Boys in Blue, an organization of Union veterans formed to support Republican Party policies and candidates. In October 1872, Alger was a vice president of the committee that organized a Republican campaign event which featured a speech by James G. Blaine, then serving as Speaker of the United States House of Representatives.

In June 1876, Alger was a vice president of the committee which sponsored a Republican rally in Detroit that began that year's presidential campaign. In early October 1876, Alger was a vice president of the committee that organized a mass Republican rally in Detroit which featured a speech by former governor Edward Follansbee Noyes of Ohio. In late October 1876, he was one of the vice presidents of the committee that organized a Republican rally in Detroit which included a keynote address by U.S. Senator James G. Blaine of Maine.

In early June 1880, Alger was a delegate to a mass interstate meeting of Union veterans which met in Chicago to devise a plan for supporting Republican candidates in that year's elections. In mid-June, he presided over the Republican meeting in Detroit which was organized to ratify the results of the 1880 Republican National Convention, which had been held earlier in the month.

== Governor of Michigan ==
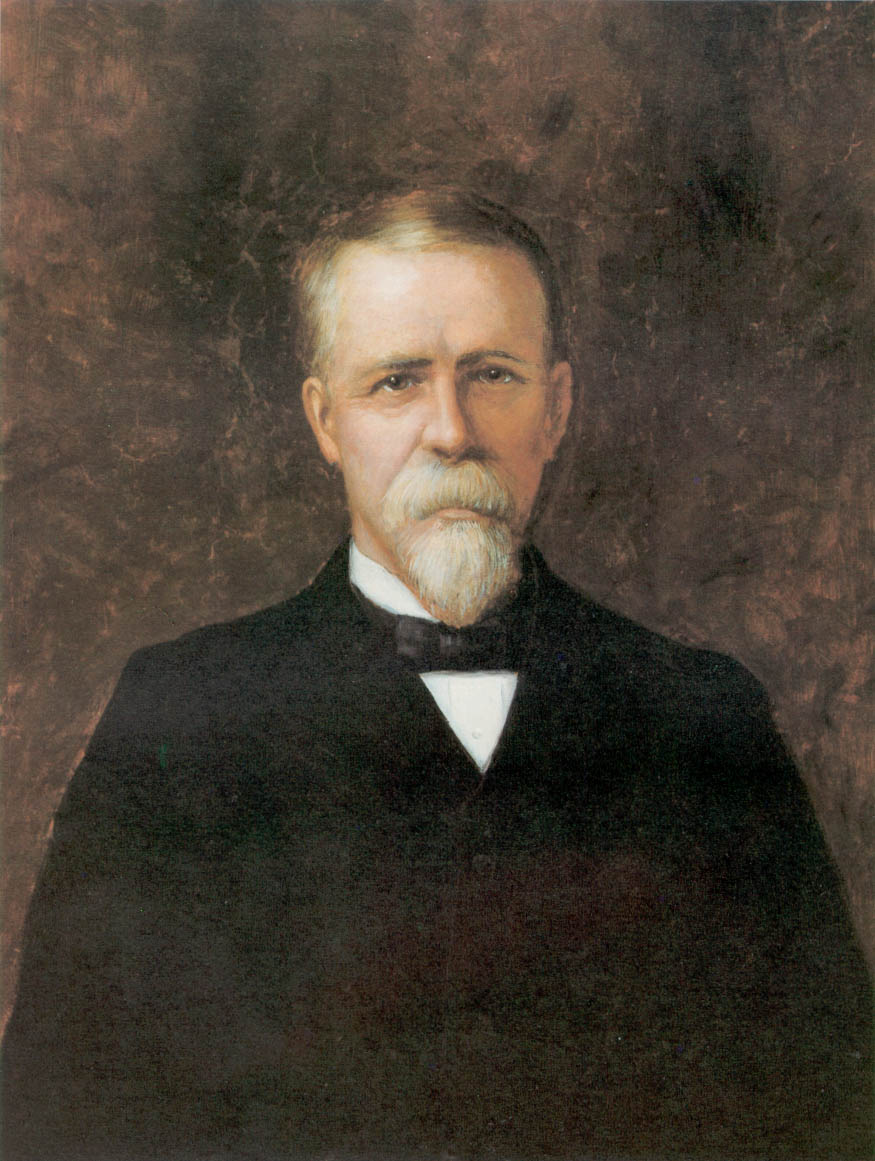
Alger in 1900, in a portrait by Percy Ives

In 1884, Alger was elected Governor of Michigan and served from January 1, 1885, to January 1, 1887. Highlights of his term included creation of the state board of pardons, the founding of a veterans home in Grand Rapids, the creation of two new counties (Alger and Iron), and establishment of the Michigan College of Mines. Alger declined renomination in 1886.

Alger's name was placed in nomination for president at the 1888 Republican National Convention. He rose in balloting to 142 votes, with 416 necessary to win, but Benjamin Harrison ultimately obtained the nomination and went on to win the general election. After the election, Alger served as a presidential elector for Harrison.

== Secretary of War ==
On March 5, 1897, Alger was appointed Secretary of War in the Cabinet of U.S. President William McKinley.

As Secretary, Alger recommended pay increases for military personnel serving at foreign embassies and legations, legislation to authorize a Second Assistant Secretary of War, and a constabulary force for Cuba, Puerto Rico, and the Philippines.

He was criticized for the inadequate preparation and inefficient operation of the department during the Spanish–American War, especially for his appointment of William R. Shafter as leader of the Cuban expedition and the United States Army beef scandal, in which poor-quality canned beef was supplied to the Army. "Algerism" became an epithet to describe the claimed incompetence of the Army, especially as compared to the more stellar performance of the Navy.

Alger resigned at President McKinley's request on August 1, 1899. He published a personal history of the war titled The Spanish–American War in 1901.

=== Vendetta against John S. Mosby ===
John Singleton Mosby accused Alger of pursuing a vendetta against him during Alger's tenure as War Secretary. Mosby had been a Confederate partisan during the Civil War. Afterwards, he became a Republican and supported the presidential candidacies of Ulysses S. Grant and Rutherford B. Hayes. In 1878, Hayes appointed Mosby as U.S. Consul in Hong Kong, where Mosby served until 1885.

Mosby supported William McKinley for president in 1896, and was assured by members of Congress close to McKinley that he could expect appointment to a consulship in Asia or South America. When no appointment was forthcoming, Mosby concluded that Alger was blocking his return to the consular service and claimed that Alger was pursuing a vendetta. According to Mosby, this was because during the war Mosby had ordered the execution of soldiers under Alger's command who were accused of looting and destroying the property of supporters of the Confederacy in 1864. Historians and authors have concluded that it is more probable that the official preventing Mosby from receiving an appointment under McKinley was Secretary of State John Sherman. When Mosby began serving in Hong Kong, he concluded that his predecessor, David H. Bailey, had been involved in embezzlement and fraud. Bailey was forced to resign as U.S. Consul in Shanghai. Bailey was from Sherman's home state of Ohio, and Sherman had authority over diplomatic appointments, so Sherman is more likely than Alger to have taken revenge on Mosby.

== U.S. Senator ==
On September 27, 1902, Alger was appointed by Michigan Governor Aaron T. Bliss to the United States Senate to fill the vacancy caused by the death of James McMillan. He was elected to the seat by the Michigan State Legislature in January 1903.

Alger was chairman of the Senate Committee on Pacific Railroads during the 59th Congress.

== Personal life ==
Alger was the founder of a prominent family, many of whom became involved in 20th century Michigan politics and active in the Republican Party.

The Algers had a home in Black River, Alcona Township, Michigan, from which Alger oversaw his lumbering operations.

On April 2, 1861, he married Annette Huldana Squire Henry of Grand Rapids. They had six children; Henrietta, Caroline, Frances, Russell Jr., Frederick, and Allan.

Frederick graduated from Harvard in 1899, served as a lieutenant colonel with the American Expeditionary Force in France during the First World War, and was awarded the French Legion of Honor.

Russell Jr. was instrumental in persuading the Packard Motor Car Company to move to Michigan from Ohio. He built a palatial Italian Renaissance style estate, "The Moorings," in Grosse Pointe. It was donated in 1949 and became the Grosse Pointe War Memorial.

== Death ==
He died in Washington, D.C., in 1907. He is interred in Elmwood Cemetery in Detroit, Michigan.

== Legacy ==
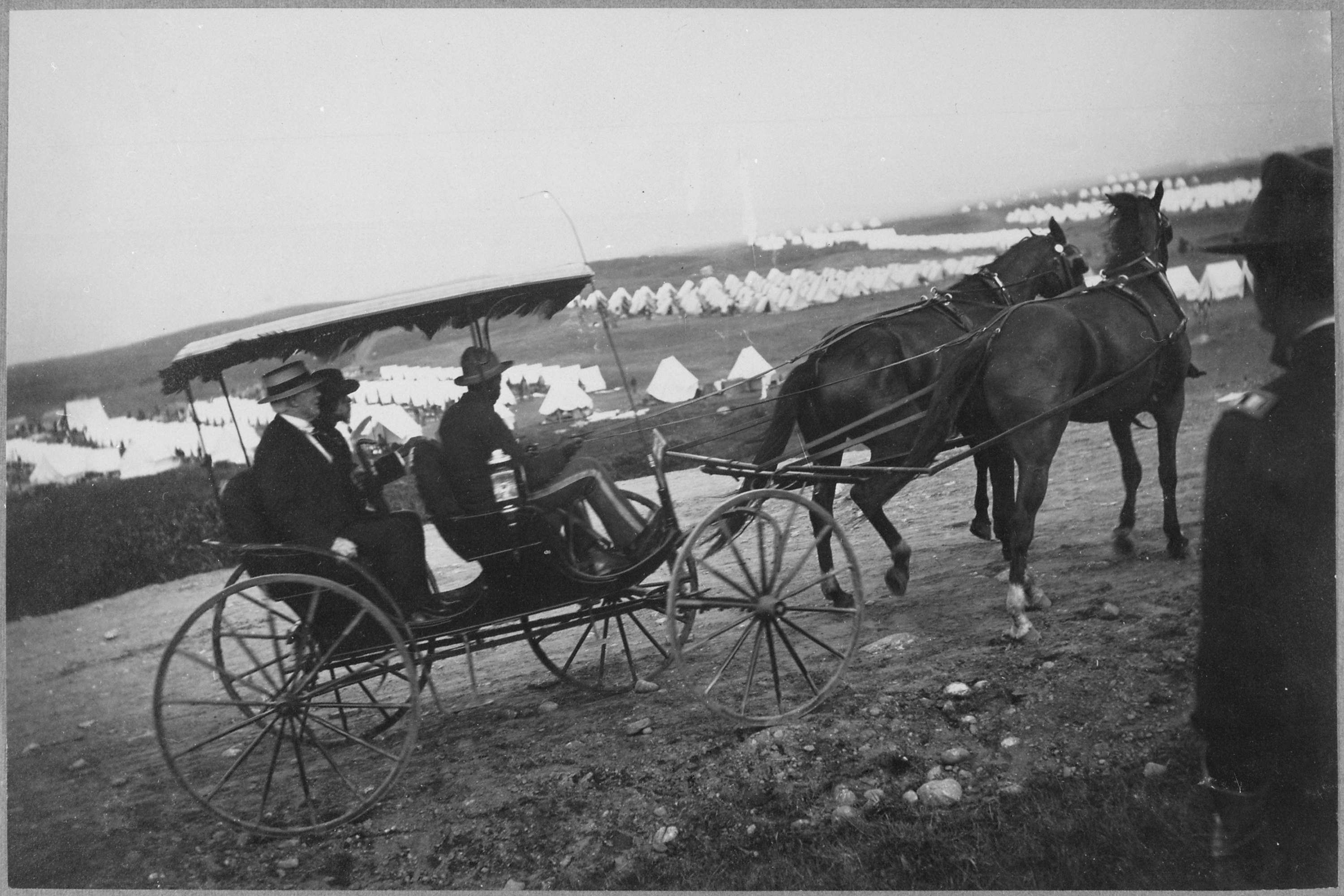
Alger as Secretary of War reviewing returning Spanish-American soldiers in 1898 at Camp Wikoff, New York

In a memorial address, Senator John Spooner of Wisconsin said of Alger, "No man without noble purpose, well-justified ambitions, strong fiber, and splendid qualities in abundance could have carved out and left behind him such a career."

An early movie entitled General Wheeler and Secretary of War Alger at Camp Wikoff documents an official visit to Camp Wikoff, New York, as Secretary of War. The visit and film were produced to garner support from the New York newspapers.

In May 1898, the War Department established Camp Russell A. Alger on a farm near Falls Church and Dunn Loring, Virginia. Faced with a typhoid fever epidemic, it was abandoned the month at the war's end in August 1898 and sold the following month. In its brief existence, 23,000 men trained there for service. It is commemorated by an official Virginia historical marker.

=== Named for Alger ===
- Alger, Michigan (1882)
- Alger County, Michigan (1885)
- Russell A. Alger Street and Alger Street in Black River, Michigan
- Alger Street in Lincoln, Michigan
- Alger Heights, a neighborhood of Grand Rapids, Michigan
- A United States Liberty ship named the SS Russell A. Alger was planned but cancelled in 1942 before construction.
- Alger Road in Richfield, Ohio.

=== Monuments ===
In 1909, a monument to Alger was erected on the William G. Mather Building in Munising, Michigan. It consists of a bronze bust of Alger on a stone pedestal, and was sculpted by Detroit sculptor Carlo Romanelli with funds provided by the heirs of Alger and by the Board of Education of the Munising Township Schools.

In 1921, a memorial fountain was dedicated to Alger in Grand Circus Park, Detroit by sculptor Daniel Chester French and architect Henry Bacon.

== See also ==
- List of members of the United States Congress who died in office (1900–1949)
- Russell Alger Memorial Fountain

== Bibliography ==
- Russell Alexander Alger (1901). The Spanish–American War. Kessinger Publishing. "The Spanish American War Russell A. Alger."
- Dictionary of American Biography
- Bell, Rodney E. "A Life of Russell Alexander Alger." Ph.D. dissertation, University of Michigan, 1975'
- Eicher, John H., and David J. Eicher, Civil War High Commands. Stanford: Stanford University Press, 2001. ISBN 0-8047-3641-3.
- U.S. Congress. Memorial Addresses for Russell Alexander Alger. 59th Cong., 2nd sess. Washington, D.C.: Government Printing Office, 1907.
- Michigan Historical Commission. 1924. Michigan Biographies: Russell Alger, Lansing.
- Michigan Commandery of the Military of the Loyal Legion of the United States.
- Final Journal of the Grand Army of the Republic, 1957. Compiled by Cora Gillis, Jamestown, New York, Past National President, Daughters of Union Veterans of the Civil War from 1861 to 1865, Inc. and last National Secretary of the Grand Army of the Republic.
- United States Congress. "Russell A. Alger (id: A000107)". Biographical Directory of the United States Congress. Retrieved on 2008-02-11

Party political offices
Preceded by David Jerome	Republican nominee for Governor of Michigan; 1884	Succeeded by Cyrus G. Luce
Political offices
Preceded by Josiah Begole	Governor of Michigan; 1885–1897	Succeeded by Cyrus G. Luce
Preceded by Daniel S. Lamont	United States Secretary of War; 1897–1899	Succeeded by Elihu Root
U.S. Senate
Preceded by James McMillan	U.S. Senator (Class 2) from Michigan; 1902–1907; Served alongside: Julius C. Burrows	Succeeded by William Smith
