= Central United Methodist Church (Detroit) =

Historic church in Michigan, United States

- U.S. National Register of Historic Places
- U.S. Historic district – Contributing property
- Michigan State Historic Site
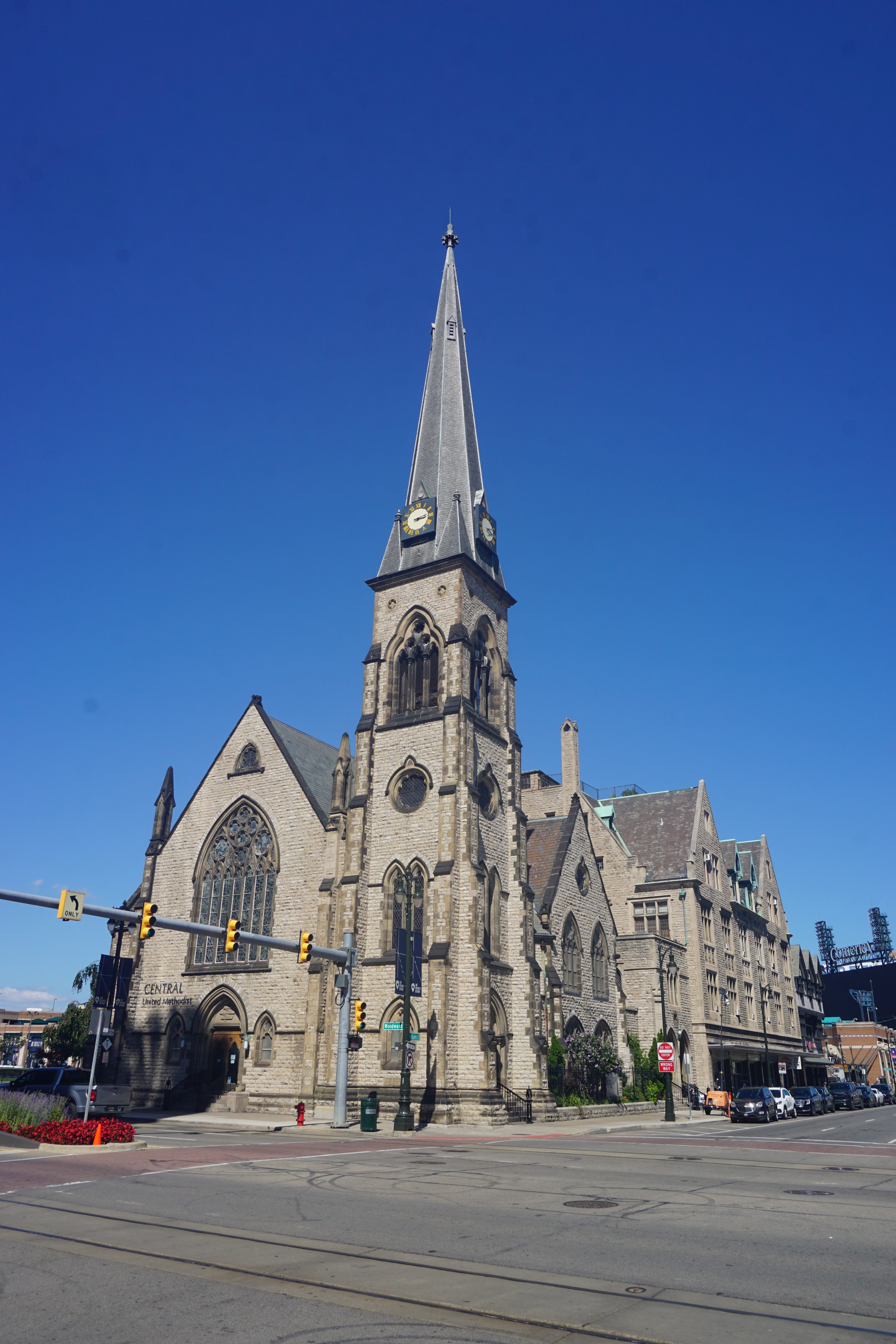
- Central United Methodist Church from across Woodward
- Interactive map
- Location: 23 East Adams Street; Detroit, Michigan
- Coordinates: 42°20′15″N 83°3′3″W
- Built: 1866
- Architect: Gordon W. Lloyd; Smith, Hinchman & Grylls
- Architectural style: Tudor Revival, Gothic Revival
- Part of: Grand Circus Park Historic District (ID83000894)
- MPS: Religious Structures of Woodward Ave. TR
- NRHP reference No.: 82002895

Significant dates
- Added to NRHP: August 3, 1982
- Designated CP: February 28, 1983
- Designated MSHS: June 6, 1977

The Central United Methodist Church is located in Downtown Detroit, Michigan. It was designated a Michigan State Historic Site in 1977 and listed on the National Register of Historic Places in 1982.

== Congregational history ==
The Central United Methodist Church's roots date back to 1804, when the first Methodist circuit riders came to Detroit for a brief visit. On the third visit of the Rev. Nathan Bangs that year, youth of the city put gunpowder in the candlesticks and cut the mane and tail off his horse. He left, "shaking the dust off his feet in testament against them," he wrote in his journal. After that experience, no circuit rider ventured to Detroit until 1809, when the Rev. William Case arrived. Case wrote to Bishop Asbury that he found it difficult to find "any serious people" in Detroit, but did note that there were a few who wanted to form a congregation. When the next circuit rider, the Rev. William Mitchell, came in 1810, the congregation was established as the First Methodist Society of Michigan. Thus Central became the first organized Protestant congregation in what was then the Michigan Territory.

Its first building, a log church, was built in 1818 outside the city on the banks of the Rouge River in what is now Dearborn. It had met in the territorial council house up until that time. The church was legally incorporated in 1822. Construction was completed on the congregation's first building within the city of Detroit in 1826, at the corner of Gratiot and Farmer. This building was replaced in 1833 by a building at Woodward and Congress, and again in 1849 by a building at Woodward and State. A church for a second congregation spun off by Central (the Congress Street Society), was built at Congress and Randolph in 1846.

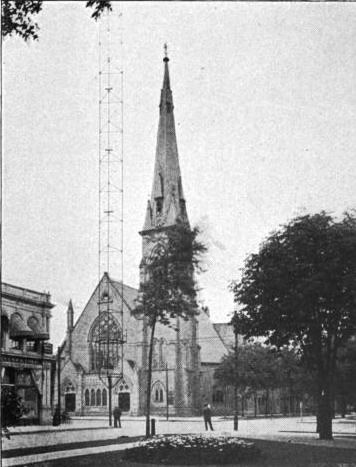
Central United Methodist Church, c. 1899

Central has long been known as a "Peace and Justice" church. In 1830 Sheriff Thomas S. Knapp, who was a member of Central, resigned rather than carry out a hanging on the commons right outside the church. Members joined a throng so horrified by the hanging that they threw the flogging post into the river and demanded an end to capital punishment in Michigan. That was the last execution in Michigan, which became the first English-speaking territory in the world to abolish the death penalty.

In 1934 the Rev. Dr. Dr. Frederick Bohn Fisher, former bishop of India, became pastor of Central. He had previously been pastor of First United Methodist Church, Ann Arbor. He was a personal friend of Gandhi, and wrote a book about him, published in 1932. In 1936 Woodward Avenue was widened and the church nave shortened to save the steeple and west wall. Dr. Fisher redesigned the now recessed divided chancel to include a pulpit, lectern, and reredos of Appalachian white oak, and a mural of the 12 apostles. He was much criticized for this ostentatious sanctuary, to which Fisher once responded, "I challenge any man or woman who thinks he has found reality because he worships in some crass, unbeautiful church. I believe symbolism is the most beautiful approach to reality. Reality is eternal and therefore this beautiful sanctuary is a symbol of the eternity of God." The sanctuary has been little changed since.

Dr. Henry Hitt Crane, senior pastor from 1938 to 1958, was a pacifist in both World Wars I and II. He was summoned to both Sen. Joseph McCarthy's committee and the House Unamerican Activities Committee, accused of being a communist. His successor Dr. James H. Laird was hung in effigy for his opposition to the Vietnam War. Central also had a draft counseling center for many years. Central became integrated in the 1950s and was known as a leader in civil rights movement. Dr. Martin Luther King, Jr. preached from Central's pulpit many times, the last just two weeks before his death.

Central has been active in the movement against the war in Iraq, Afghanistan, and Palestine. It is often the gathering place for peace rallies and the starting point for many marches. Central has taken a strong stance for the rights of unions to organize and was the headquarters for the strike against both of Detroit's major newspapers in the 1990s. In 2001 it became a Reconciling Congregation, welcoming LGBT people into all aspects of its ministry. Central's Associate Minister in the early part of the 2000s, Rev. DaVita McCallister, was the first avowed gay or lesbian to serve as a United Methodist pastor in Michigan. When she wanted to get married, she had to leave because of United Methodist Church policy. Central's congregation supported her and is working to change the churchwide policy that forced her to leave.

Central is cosponsor of The NOAH Project (Networking Organizing Advocating for the Homeless), which operates a Community Center, serving lunch four times a week, one-on-one social services, volunteer nurses, a Job Readiness Class, and an arts program for the homeless. Storefront spaces in the church building house the Swords Into Plowshares Peace Center and Gallery and The Value Shop, a resale shop primarily serving the impoverished people of Detroit. Central also houses the National Welfare Rights Organization, a Library of Black Labor History, Westside Mothers, and Moratorium Now, an organization working to ban banks from foreclosing on homes for at least two years. Central celebrated its bicentennial in 2010 with many guest speakers and performers throughout the year including the Rev. Jesse Jackson, Sr. on Sun. Jan. 24, 2010.

== Building history ==
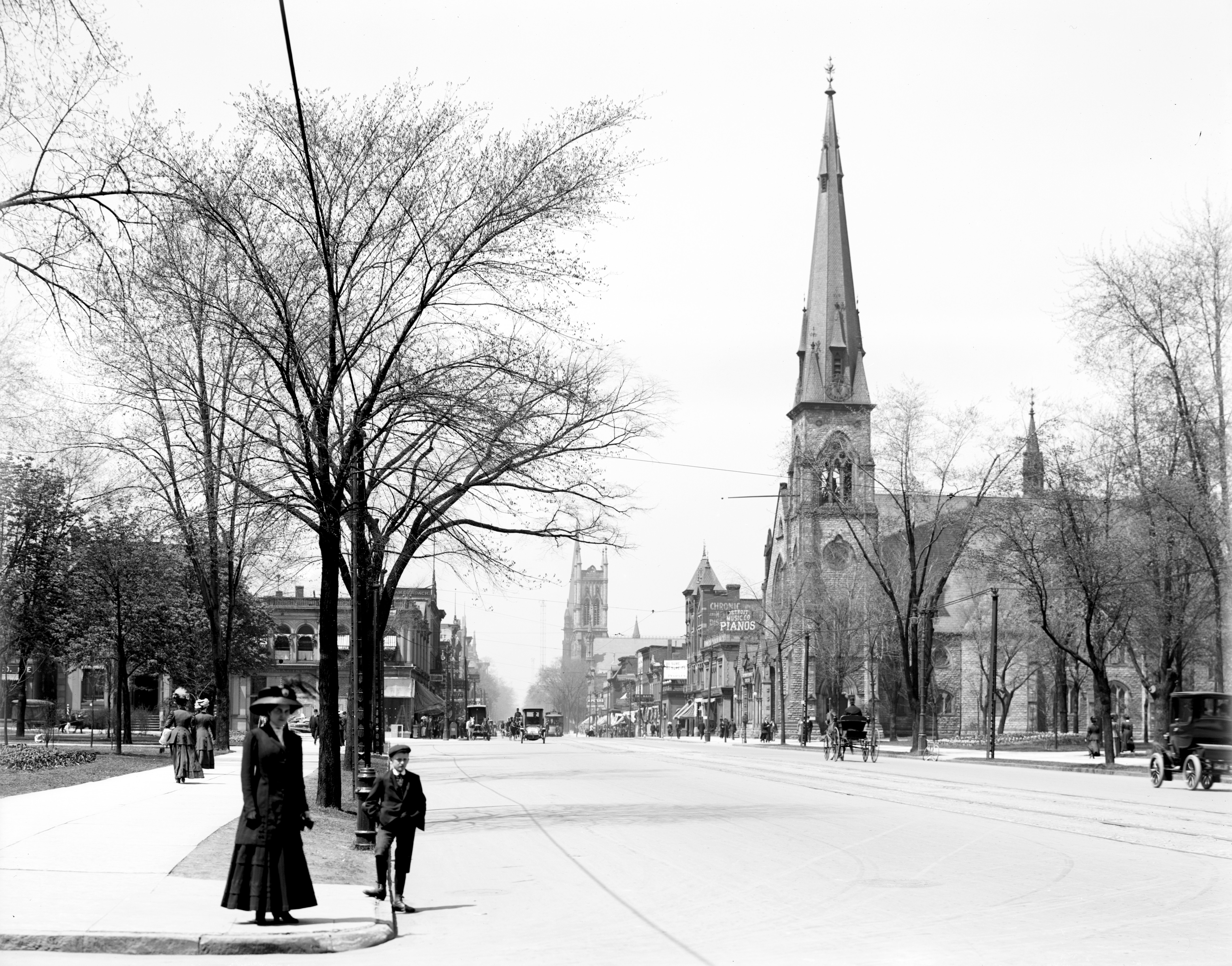
Central United Methodist Church c. 1910, looking north along Woodward Avenue. St. John's Episcopal Church can be seen in the far background

When the church at Congress and Randolph burned down in 1863, the two congregations consolidated and decided to build a church at Woodward and Adams. The cornerstone of Central Church's sanctuary was laid on July 3, 1866. The original church campus included the sanctuary, a chapel, an office building, and a parsonage on Adams Street. The smaller buildings were demolished in 1916, and a six-story church house was built in their place.

In 1936, Woodward Avenue was widened. To reconfigure the church, a thirty-foot section of the nave was torn down and the west wall and steeple rolled eastward 26 feet (7.9 m), thus shortening the nave. At the same time the sanctuary was remodeled, with a new recessed chancel with an elevated pulpit and lectern, and high altar carved of Appalachian Mountain White Oak by Grand Rapids master wood carver, Alois Lang. The main altar has a 30 ft (9.1 m) high reredos carved of Appalachian Mountain White Oak also by woodcarver Alois Lang. . On the arch surrounding the altar is a mural of the 12 Apostles painted by Detroit artists Elliott and David Skinner, who were members of Central at the time. Thomas Di Lorenzo painted the ceiling, with 230 panels of symbols of the Christian church. Those symbols were taken from the Temple of Heaven in Peking (China), the Mosque of Omar in Jerusalem, and the Vatican's Sistine Chapel. Stained glass windows made by the Henry Lee Willett Studios in Philadelphia were installed in 1956.
