= Michigan Mutual Liability Company Complex =

Coordinates: 42.3372°N 83.0518°W

The Michigan Mutual Liability Company Complex is located in Foxtown, along West Elizabeth Street and West Adams Avenue, between Woodward Avenue and Park Avenue, just across Adams Ave. from Grand Circus Park, in downtown Detroit, Michigan. The two buildings that make up the complex are the Grand Park Centre and Michigan Mutual Liability Annex, which are connected via a skyway.
