= Frederick Bohn Fisher =

Frederick Bohn Fisher Bishop of the Methodist Episcopal Church
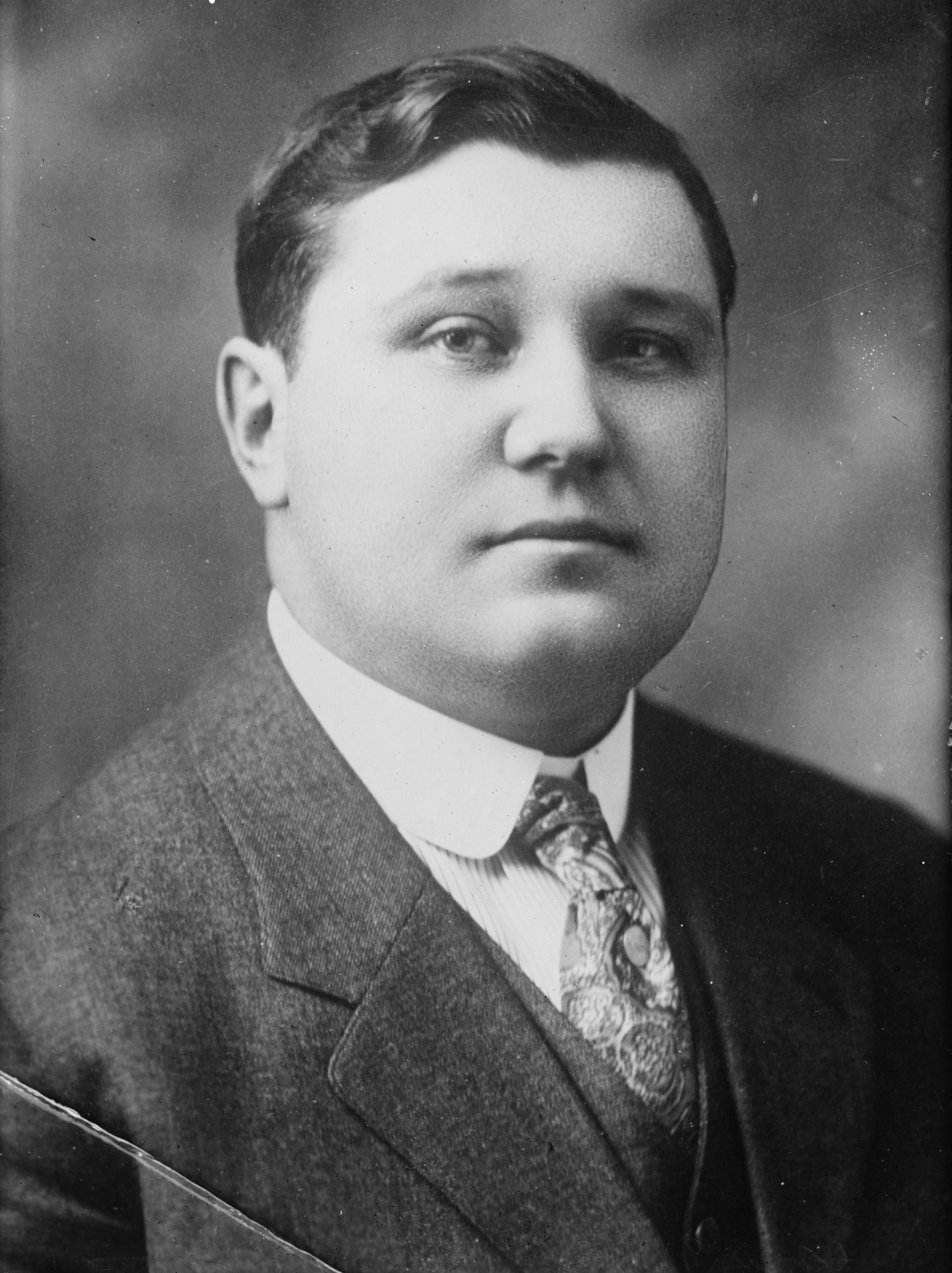
- Frederick Bohn Fisher circa 1920
- Born: February 14, 1882; Greencastle, Pennsylvania
- Died: April 15, 1938 (aged 56)
- Education: Asbury University (B.Sc) (B.A); Boston University; Harvard Divinity School
- Spouse(s): Edith Jackson (m. 1904) Welthy Honsinger (m. 1924, died)
- Parents: James Edward Fisher (father); Josephine Fisher (mother)

Frederick Bohn Fisher (14 February 1882 – 15 April 1938) was an American bishop of the Methodist Episcopal Church, elected in 1920. He also gained notability as a pastor, missionary, author, and official in the Methodist missionary and men's movements. He is also one of the founders of the prestigious Mount Hermon School, Darjeeling. The yellow house in Mount Hermon School is named after him as Fisher House.

== Birth and family ==
Fisher was born in Greencastle, Pennsylvania. He was of English ancestry, the son of James Edward and Josephine (née Shirey) Fisher. He married Edith Jackson on 4 February 1903. In 1924 he married Welthy Honsinger.

== Education ==
He graduated from Muncie Central High School. He earned both B.S. and A.B. degrees from Asbury University in 1902. He studied at both Boston University and Harvard Divinity School, 1907–1908.

== Ordained ministry and missionary service ==
Fisher entered the North Indiana Annual Conference of the Methodist Episcopal Church, serving as pastor in Kokomo, Indiana (1903). He then went as a missionary to Agra, India (the North West India Conference), serving 1904–1905. He transferred his conference membership to the New England Annual Conference, serving the First Methodist Episcopal Church in Boston (1907).

Rev. Fisher then became the Eastern Field Secretary for the Board of Foreign Missions of the Methodist Episcopal Church (1911–1912). He was then appointed the General Secretary of the Laymen's Missionary Movement of his denomination (1913–1915), then the Associate General Secretary of the Laymen's Missionary Movement in the U.S. and Canada (beginning in 1916), transferring his conference membership back to the North Indiana Conference in 1913. His office was located at 1 Madison Avenue, New York City. He resided in Edgewater, New Jersey.

Rev. Fisher was a delegate to the World's Missionary Conference in Edinburgh, 1910. He was a Trustee of Asbury College, as well. In his official capacities, he organized conventions of Methodist Men in Indianapolis (1913), Boston (1914), and Columbus, Ohio (1915). The volumes Militant Methodism, New England Methodism, and The Challenge of Today were produced as a result.

== Episcopal ministry ==
Rev. Fisher was elected to the episcopacy in 1920 and assigned as Resident Bishop of the Calcutta episcopal area. He resigned the Episcopacy in 1930 and returned to the U.S. to become pastor of First United Methodist Church, Ann Arbor, Michigan. This is the only time on record that a Methodist bishop has resigned for other than health reasons, and he was the only bishop ever to return to the local pastoral work. In 1934 he accepted appointment as senior pastor of Central United Methodist Church in Detroit. While there, Woodward Avenue, the main street in the city, was widened. In order not to lose the steeple and west wall, a thirty-foot section was removed and the steeple and wall moved back to meet the rest of the church thus shortening the knave. Dr. Fisher designed a new recessed chancel including the new pulpit, reredos, mural of the apostles and had the ceiling painted with religious symbols from all over the world. He died 15 April 1938, Good Friday, in Detroit. His funeral was held on Easter Sunday in Central United Methodist Church, the only Easter funeral Detroit had ever known.

== Selected writings ==
- Editor, Militant Methodism, New York: Methodist Book Concern, 1913.
- Editor, New England Methodism, New York: Methodist Book Concern, 1914.
- Editor, The Challenge of Today, New York: Methodist Book Concern, 1915.
- The Way to Win, New York: Methodist Book Concern, 1915.
- The Man That Changed the World. Nashville, TN: Cokesbury Press. 1917.
- That Strange Little Brown Man Gandhi. New York: Ray Long and Richard R. Smith Inc. 1932.

== See also ==
- List of bishops of the United Methodist Church
