= Michigan Mutual Liability Annex =

Office building in downtown Detroit, Michigan

Coordinates: 42.3372°N 83.0518°W

The Michigan Mutual Liability Annex is an office building in downtown Detroit, Michigan, located at 25 West Elizabeth Street.

The high-rise was constructed in 1950 and finished in 1951. It stands at 13 floors in height, 10 above, and 3 below-ground. it is a part of the Michigan Mutual Liability Company Complex.

The Michigan Mutual Liability Annex is used mainly for offices, and includes a parking garage. The building was designed in the modern architectural style, and was built with brick and granite.

== Description ==
- Architect: Harley, Ellington, Day
- This building includes a 4-story parking garage at its base.
- Though rather plain in design and decoration, the building's ground floor is clad in granite.
- This building's first four floors are a 115-space parking garage that serve both the annex and the adjoining Grand Park Centre.
- The ground floor of this building is faced in granite, while the rest of the building is faced in simple brick.
- The main roof deck parapet rises to a height of 125'-4.25".
- The building is joined to the adjacent Grand Park Centre by a ramp in the lowest basement of the building, and by a skybridge that starts at the 4th floor lobby connecting all the way to the top at each floor of the building.
