= Russell Alger Memorial Fountain =

Fountain in Detroit, Michigan, U.S.

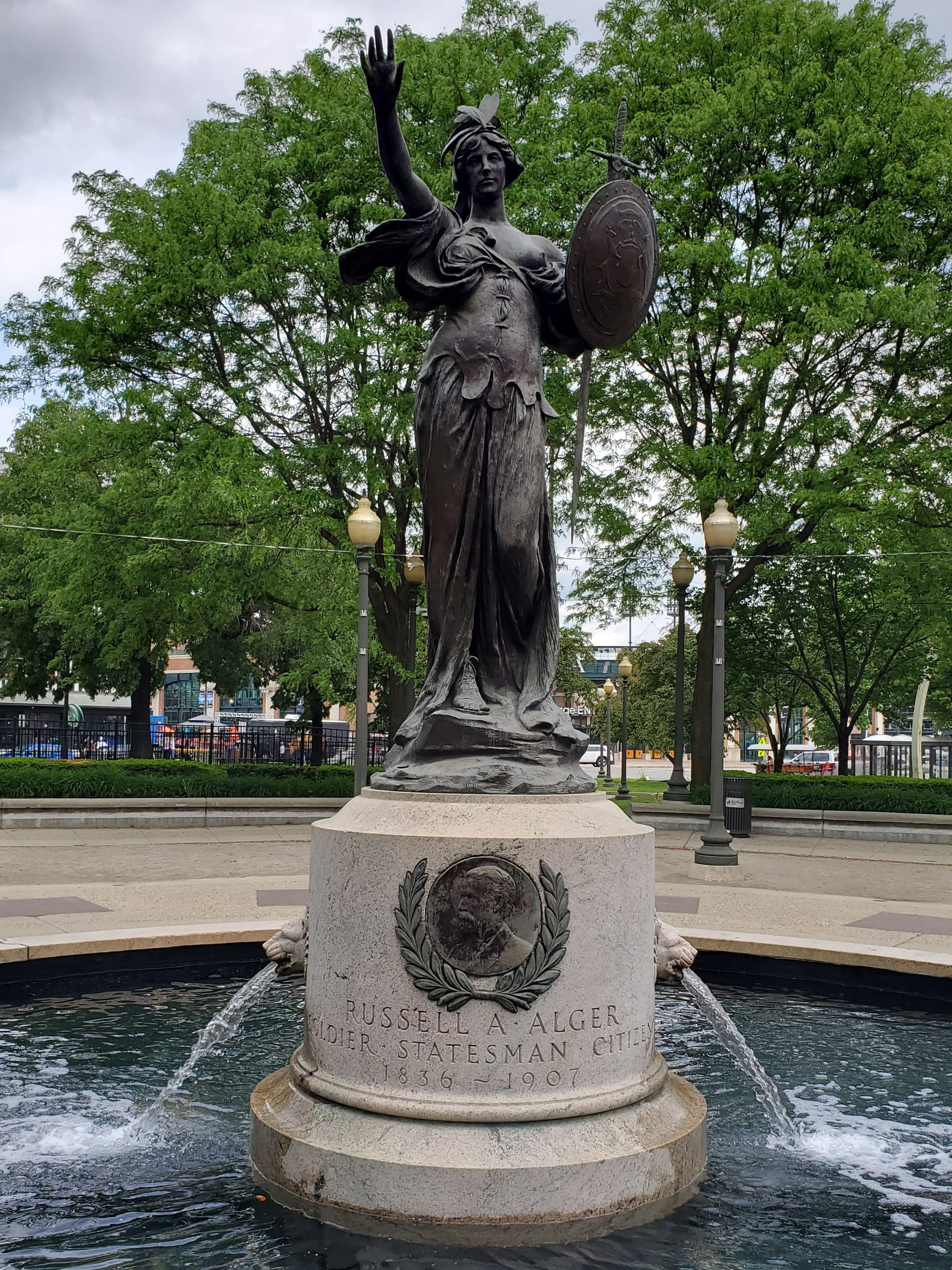
- The fountain in 2022
- 42.33689°N 83.04993°W
- Location: Grand Circus Park Historic District, Detroit, Michigan, United States
- Designer: Daniel Chester French (sculptor); Henry Bacon (architect)
- Type: Fountain; Statue
- Material: Bronze
- Dedicated date: July 27, 1921
- Dedicated to: Russell A. Alger

Russell Alger Memorial Fountain is a Detroit, Michigan fountain, one of the "most successful collaborations" created by the sculptor, Daniel Chester French and architect Henry Bacon. The bronze statue was cast by the Gorham Manufacturing Company. It is located in Grand Circus Park and was dedicated on July 27, 1921.

The Beaux-Arts styled bronze monument consists of a "spirited" female personification of "Michigan" with one hand raised in greeting while the other holds a sword and shield. The crest of the state of Michigan is on the shield in shallow relief. There is a bas relief portrait of Alger on the granite base. Lion heads on the base serve as founts to pour water into the surrounding bowl.

Russell Alger (1836–1907) was a Civil War veteran (he enlisted as a private and ended the war as a general), politician (Governor of Michigan, U.S. Senator from Michigan, and U.S. Secretary of War), and a very successful businessman. Following Alger's death a "memorial society" of Civil War veterans convened and commissioned the work.

== See also ==
- Public sculptures by Daniel Chester French
