= Detroit Opera House =

Historic theater in Detroit, Michigan, US

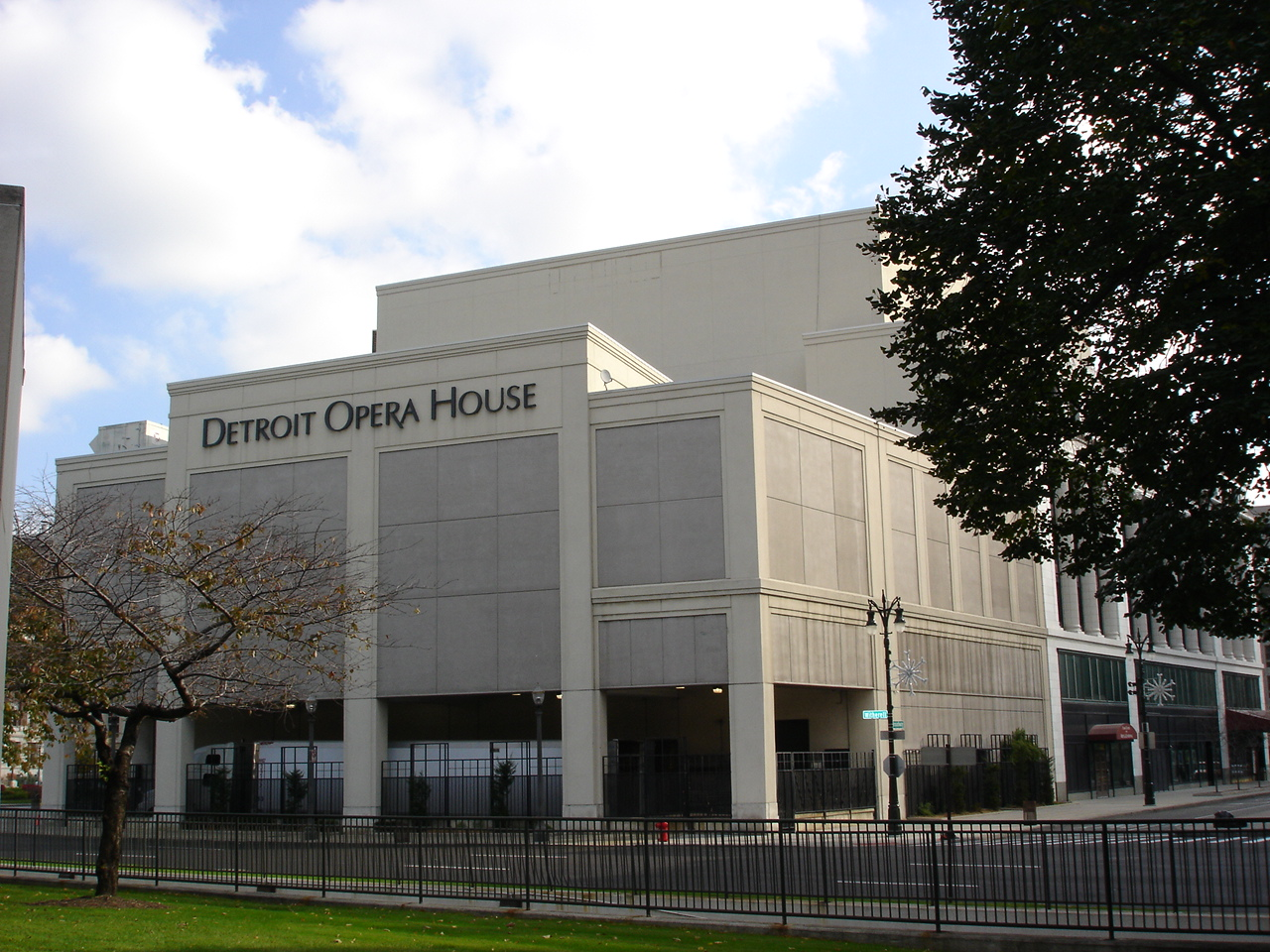
- Detroit Opera House overlooks Grand Circus Park.
- Interactive map of Detroit Opera House
- Former names: Grand Circus Theater (1960s–1985) (Note: The name Grand Circus Theatre may cause confusion, since another Grand Circus Theatre (1913–1924), originally known as the Central Theatre, once stood at 2115 Woodward Avenue. What is now The Fillmore Detroit Theatre (1925) arose on the same site at 2115 Woodward.); Broadway Capitol Theater (1934–1960s); Paramount Theater (1929–1934); Capitol Theater (1922–1929)
- Location: 1526 Broadway Street; Detroit, Michigan
- Coordinates: 42°20′11″N 83°2′55″W
- Capacity: 2,700
- Type: Opera
- Public transit: Broadway

Construction
- Opened: January 22, 1922
- Reopened: 1996

Website
- Detroit Opera official site
- Detroit Opera House
- U.S. Historic district – Contributing property
- Part of: Grand Circus Park Historic District (ID83000894)
- Designated CP: February 28, 1983

The Detroit Opera House is an ornate opera house located at 1526 Broadway Street in Downtown Detroit, Michigan, within the Grand Circus Park Historic District. The 2,700-seat venue is the home of productions of the Detroit Opera and a variety of other events. The theatre was originally designed by C. Howard Crane, who created other prominent theatres in Detroit including The Fillmore Detroit, the Fox Theater, and the Detroit Symphony's Orchestra Hall. It opened on January 22, 1922.

The building underwent an extensive restoration which took place under the control of Detroit-based architectural design firm, Albert Kahn Associates, Inc. It reopened in 1996.

== History ==
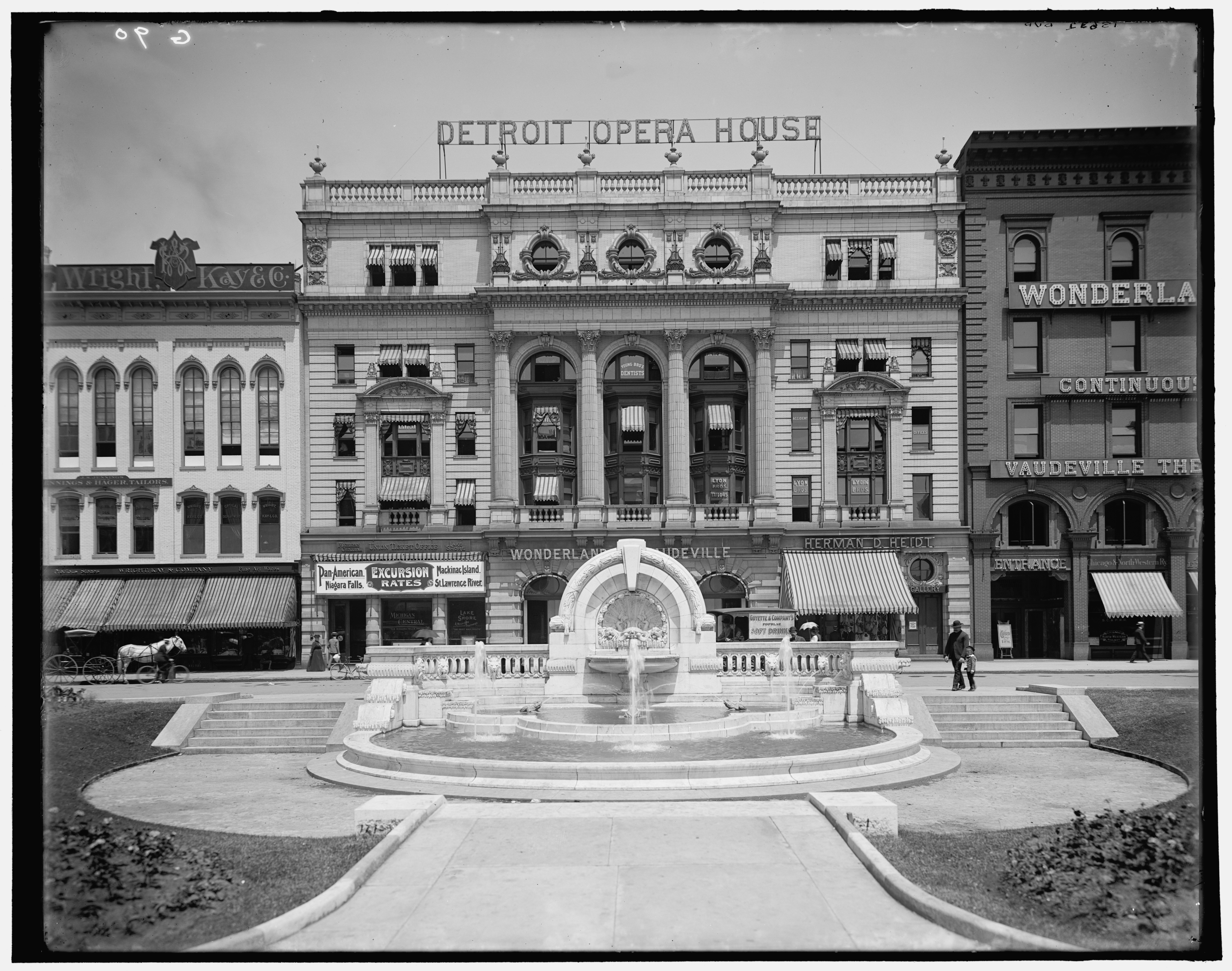
Old Detroit Opera House in 1906

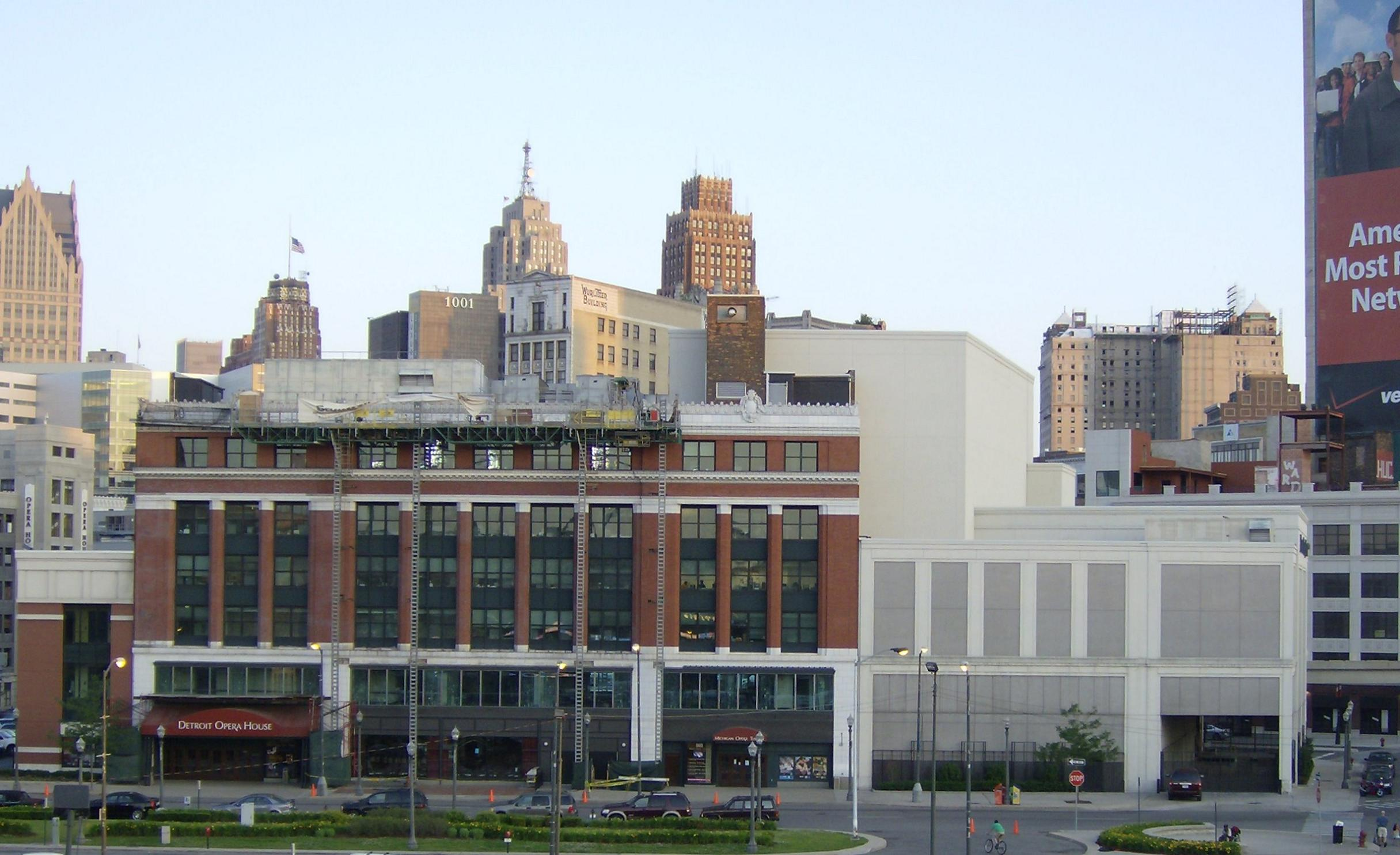
The original Opera House structure (left) and stagehouse extension along Madison Avenue

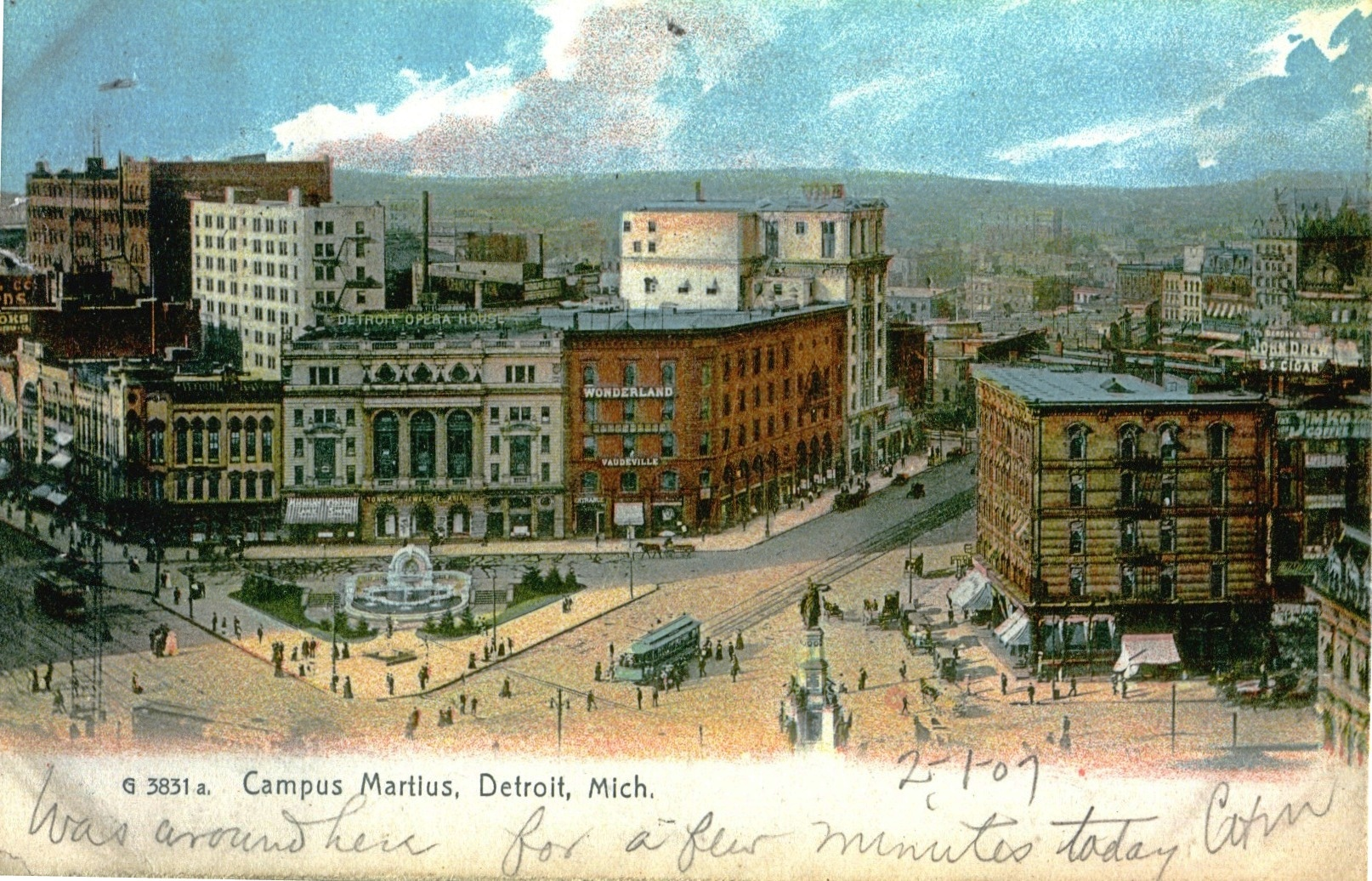
Old Detroit Opera House (behind fountain) on Campus Martius in 1907.

Over the years, opera has been presented at a variety of venues in Detroit - the Old Detroit Opera House (1869–1963) at Campus Martius, the Whitney Grand Opera House (Garrick Theatre) at Griswold Street and Michigan Avenue, and the New Detroit Opera House (1886–1928) at Randolph and Monroe Streets.

The Nederlander Organization, a major theatrical producer, began in Detroit with a 99-year lease on the Old Detroit Opera House in 1912.

The present Detroit Opera House opened in 1922 and was known as the Capitol Theatre. It was among the first of several performance venues built around Detroit's Grand Circus Park. When it opened, the Capitol was reportedly the fifth largest movie theater in the world, seating about 3,500 people. In 1929, the Capitol Theater became the Paramount Theater, and in 1934, the Broadway Capitol Theater.

During the first few decades of its history the theater presented feature films along with live entertainment including artists such as jazz legends Louis Armstrong and Duke Ellington. Later the Broadway Capitol converted to a movies-only policy. Following a minor restoration in the 1960s, the building became the 3,367-seat Grand Circus Theatre. The theater closed in 1978 after surviving several years exhibiting second-run and soft-core porn films. It reopened again briefly in 1981, but closed after a minor fire in 1985 caused damage.

In 1988, the Michigan Opera Theatre purchased the building and dubbed it the Detroit Opera House, after an extensive restoration and stage expansion. The reopening in 1996 was celebrated with a gala event featuring Luciano Pavarotti and other noted artists. The Detroit Opera House is now configured with seating for an audience of 2,700. Since 1996, the opera house has annually hosted five opera productions, five dance productions from touring companies, and a variety of other musical and comedy events.

The Opera House is featured prominently in the 2012 documentary Detropia.
