= Welthy Honsinger Fisher =

American activist

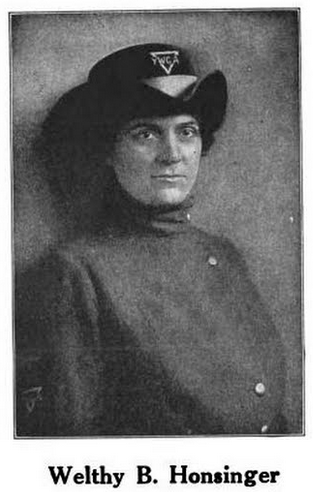
- Welthy B. Honsinger, from a 1918 publication
- Born: Welthy Blakesley Honsinger; September 18, 1879; Rome, New York, United States
- Died: December 16, 1980 (aged 101); Southbury, Connecticut, United States
- Education: Syracuse University
- Occupation: Teacher
- Spouse: Frederick Bohn Fisher (m. 1924; died 1938)
- Honours: Ramon Magsaysay Award (1960)

Welthy Honsinger Fisher (September 18, 1879 – December 16, 1980) was the American founder of World Education and World Literacy Canada. She was married to Frederick Bohn Fisher, a bishop of the Methodist Episcopal Church, missionary, author, and official in Methodist missionary and men's movements. She was an intellectual, and activist requested by her friend Mahatma Gandhi to begin Literacy House outside of Lucknow, India, at the age of 73.

== Birth and family ==
Welthy Blakesley Honsinger was born in Rome, New York, on September 18, 1879.

== Education and early work ==
After graduating from Syracuse University in 1900, Honsinger became a teacher at Rosebud College, a one-room school in Haverstraw, New York, where she was in charge of 15 students. In 1906, Honsinger become the headmistress of the Baldwin Memorial School in Nanchang. While there, she encouraged her girls to develop into new, modern Chinese women, often against the wishes of their traditional parents. She was committed to the idea of women's independence, however, and knew that if she could give them the tools they needed through education, they could change the face of China.

== Personal life ==
In 1924 she married Frederick Bohn Fisher. The Fishers were well-acquainted with and respected by Gandhi and other prominent leaders of the Indian Independence movement. Following her husband's death in 1938, she wrote her husband's biography and traveled widely, returning to China and then to India.

== Literacy work ==
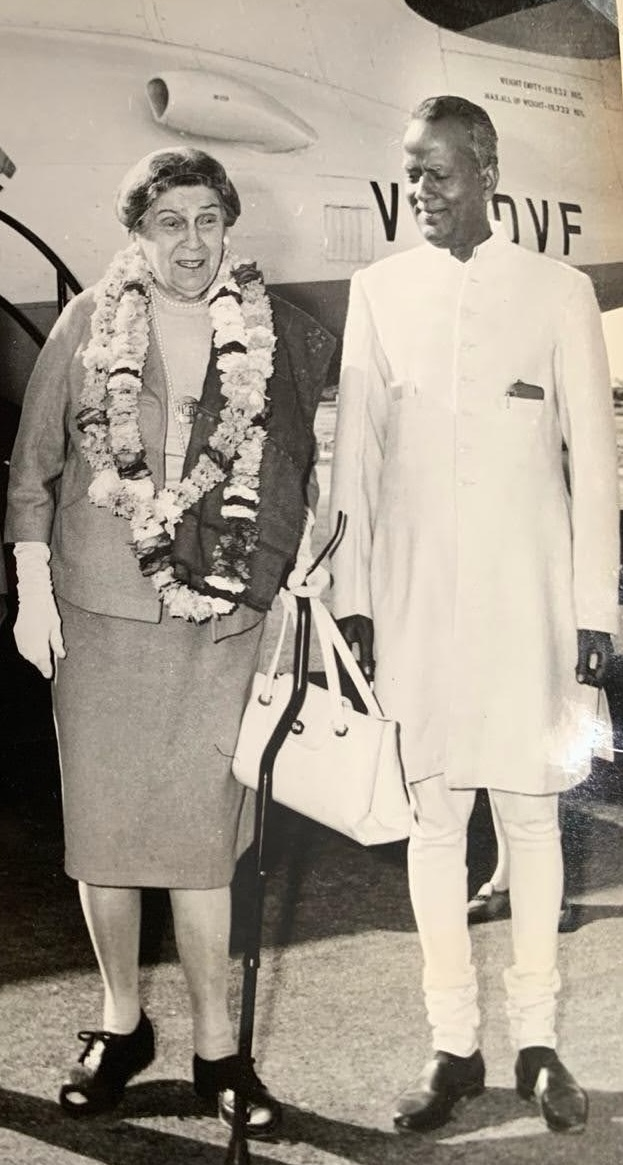
Founder of Literacy House Welthy Fisher with Kedar Nath Srivastava Director in Udaipur 1967-68

During the 1940s, Fisher spent "semesters" studying the educational systems of Mexico, Peru, Bolivia, Brazil, India and the Middle East. During this time she studied women and educational systems, and lectured throughout the U.S. on women of the world and Chinese Industrial Cooperatives. In December, 1947, six weeks before his death, Gandhi urged Fisher to return to his country to continue her work in education in India's villages.

In 1952, at the age of 73, Fisher returned to India to work with Frank Laubach, the Christian Evangelical missionary and literacy pioneer. Deciding that literacy training linked with agricultural and industrial development was a key strategy to eradicate poverty, Fisher broke with Laubach. In 1953, she founded Literacy House at Allahabad, a small, non-formal school that combined literacy with vocational training. In 1956, Literacy House moved to Lucknow, Uttar Pradesh, where it became famous for its effectiveness.

Realizing the need for literacy programs linked with social and economic development throughout the world, Fisher and her fellow literacy pioneers started two non-profit organizations, World Education (in 1951, which started as World Literacy) and the World Literacy of Canada (in 1955). Fisher was closely involved in both organizations for many years, either as President or an advisor. Throughout her nineties, she traveled throughout the world. Fisher made her final trip to India as a government guest in 1980, shortly before her death at the age of 101 in Southbury, Connecticut.

Fisher was honored by the Indian government, which based its village literacy programs on her ideas, and issued a stamp in her likeness.

== Awards and honors ==
- 1964 Ramon Magsaysay Award for International Understanding.
- On March 18, 1980, the government of India issued a Welthy Honsinger Fisher commemorative postage stamp. She is the only American to be so honored.
- She became the first recipient of the Nehru Literacy Award, India

== In the media ==
Welthy's work in India was highlighted in the 1966 Time magazine article "Education Abroad: India's Literacy Lady".
