= Grand Circus Park Historic District =

Historic district in Michigan, United States

- U.S. National Register of Historic Places
- U.S. Historic district
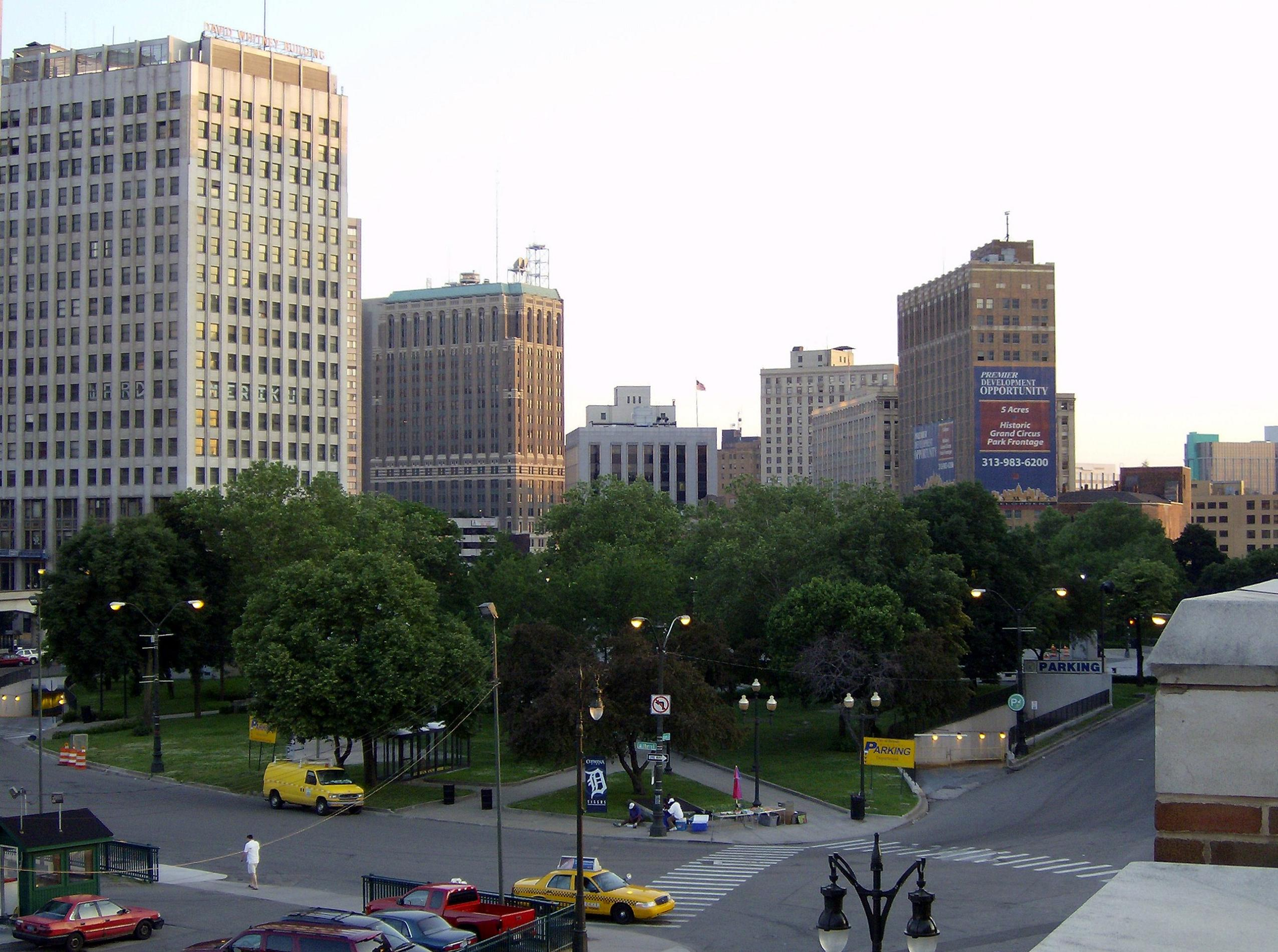
- Looking southwest
- Interactive map
- Location: Detroit, Michigan, U.S.
- Coordinates: 42°20′10″N 83°3′2″W
- Built: 1867
- NRHP reference No.: 83000894; 00001488 (boundary increase)
- Added to NRHP: February 28, 1983; December 07, 2000 (boundary increase); December 12, 2012 (additional documentation approved)

The Grand Circus Park Historic District contains the 5-acre (2.0 ha) Grand Circus Park in Downtown Detroit, Michigan that connects the theatre district with the financial district. It is bisected by Woodward Avenue, four blocks north of Campus Martius Park, and is roughly bounded by Clifford, John R. and Adams Streets. The district was listed on the National Register of Historic Places in 1983. The building at 25 West Elizabeth Street was added to the district in 2000, and additional structures located within the district, but built between 1932 and 1960, were approved for inclusion in 2012.

== History ==
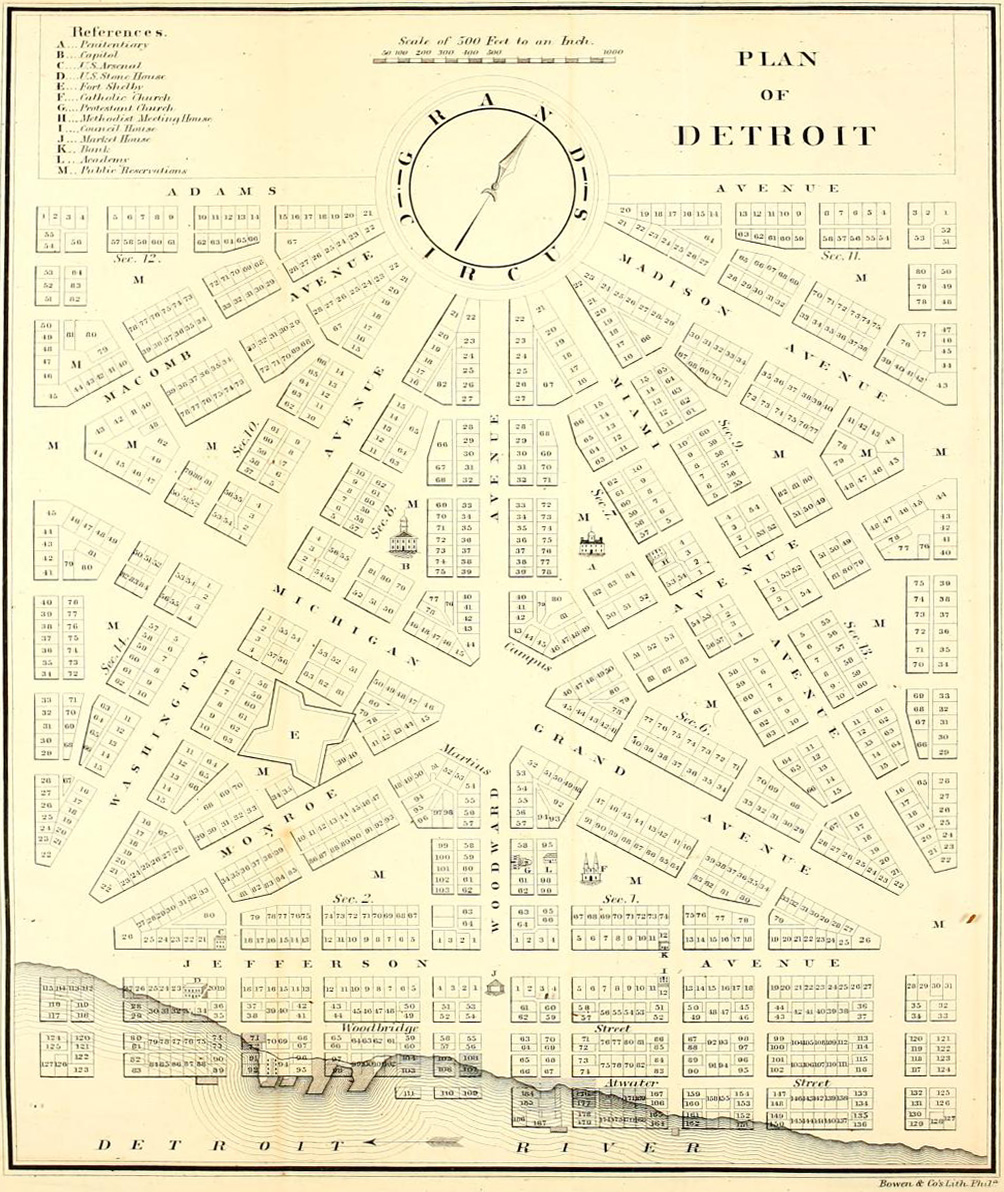
Augustus Woodward's plan for Detroit's baroque styled radial avenues and Grand Circus Park

A part of Augustus Woodward's plan to rebuild the city after the fire of 1805, the city established the park in 1850. Woodward's original plan called for the park to be a full circle, but after construction began, property owners north of Adams Street were reluctant to sell due to rising land values. The Detroit Opera House overlooks the eastern edge of the park and the grounds include statuary and large fountains. Near this historic site, General George Armstrong Custer delivered a eulogy for thousands gathered to mourn the death of President Abraham Lincoln. Architect Henry Bacon designed the Russell Alger Memorial Fountain (1921) in Grand Circus Park. Bacon's other projects include the Lincoln Memorial (1915–1922) in Washington, D.C. The fountain contains a classic Roman figure symbolizing Michigan by American sculptor Daniel French who sculpted the figure of Lincoln for the Memorial.

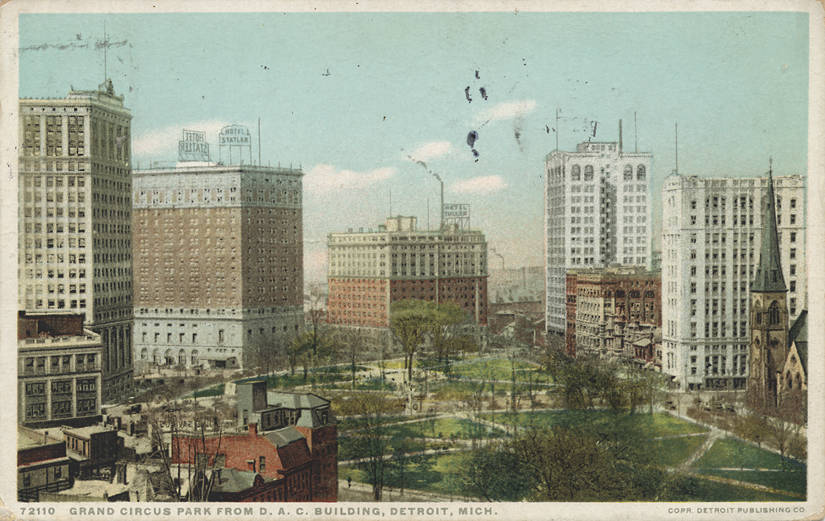
Grand Circus Park, circa 1910s

In 1957, the City of Detroit constructed a parking garage under the two halves of the park. The eastern portion houses space for 250 cars and the western portion accommodates 540.

The half-moon shaped park is divided down its center by Woodward Avenue, the city's main thoroughfare. The Alger Fountain anchors the eastern half and is capped on its north western edge with a statue of mayor William Cotter Maybury. Its western half is anchored by the Edison Fountain and capped on its north eastern edge with a statue of mayor Hazen Pingree.

The Maybury and Pingree monuments have been relocated several times. The Pingree statue was erected in 1904 near Woodward and Park Avenues facing south, while his rival, Maybury, occupied a site in the eastern half of the park facing Pingree across Woodward Avenue. After the 1957 garage construction, Pingree was returned to his original site while Maybury was placed at the north boundary of the park with his back to his foe. In the 1990s, both statues moved once again to their current locations.

Among the notable buildings encircling the park are the David Broderick Tower and David Whitney Building on the south, Kales Building, and Central United Methodist Church on the north, and Comerica Park and Detroit Opera House on the East.

== Development ==
On November 12, 2007, Quicken Loans announced its development agreement with the city to move its headquarters to downtown Detroit, consolidating about 4,000 of its suburban employees in a move considered to be a high importance to city planners to reestablish the historic downtown. The construction sites reserved for development under the agreement include the location of the former Statler on Grand Circus Park and the former Hudson's location. (The western edge of the park was formerly home to the now demolished Statler and Tuller hotels). Grand Circus is serviced by a QLine and People Mover station.

== East necklace ==
The Detroit Opera House is located at Broadway and Grand Circus. The east necklace of downtown links Grand Circus and the stadium area to Greektown along Broadway. The east necklace contains a sub-district sometimes called the Harmonie Park District, which has taken on the renowned legacy of Detroit's music from 1930s through the 1950s to the present. Near the Opera House, and emanating from Grand Circus along the east necklace are other venues including the Music Hall Center for the Performing Arts and the Gem Theatre and Century Club. The historic Harmonie Club and Harmonie Centre are located along Broadway. The Harmonie Park area ends near Gratiot and Randolph. The Detroit Athletic Club stands in view of center field at Comerica Park. Part of the east necklace, the area contains architecturally notable buildings planned for renovation as high-rise residential condominiums such as the Gothic Revival Metropolitan Building at 33 John R Street. The Hilton Garden Inn is also in the Harmonie Park area. The east necklace area is serviced by the People Mover at the Cadillac and Broadway Stations.

== Gallery ==
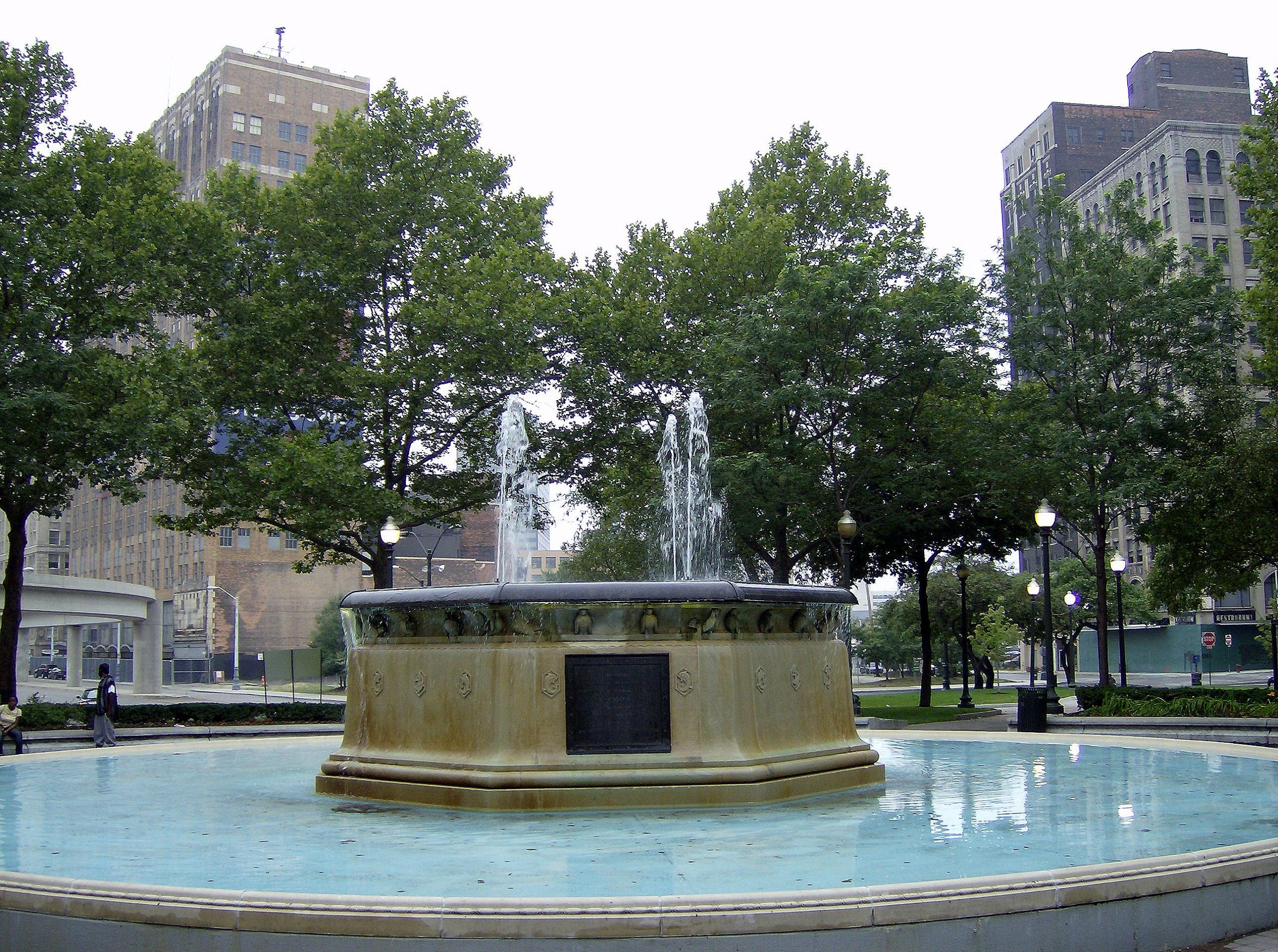
Thomas Edison Memorial Fountain

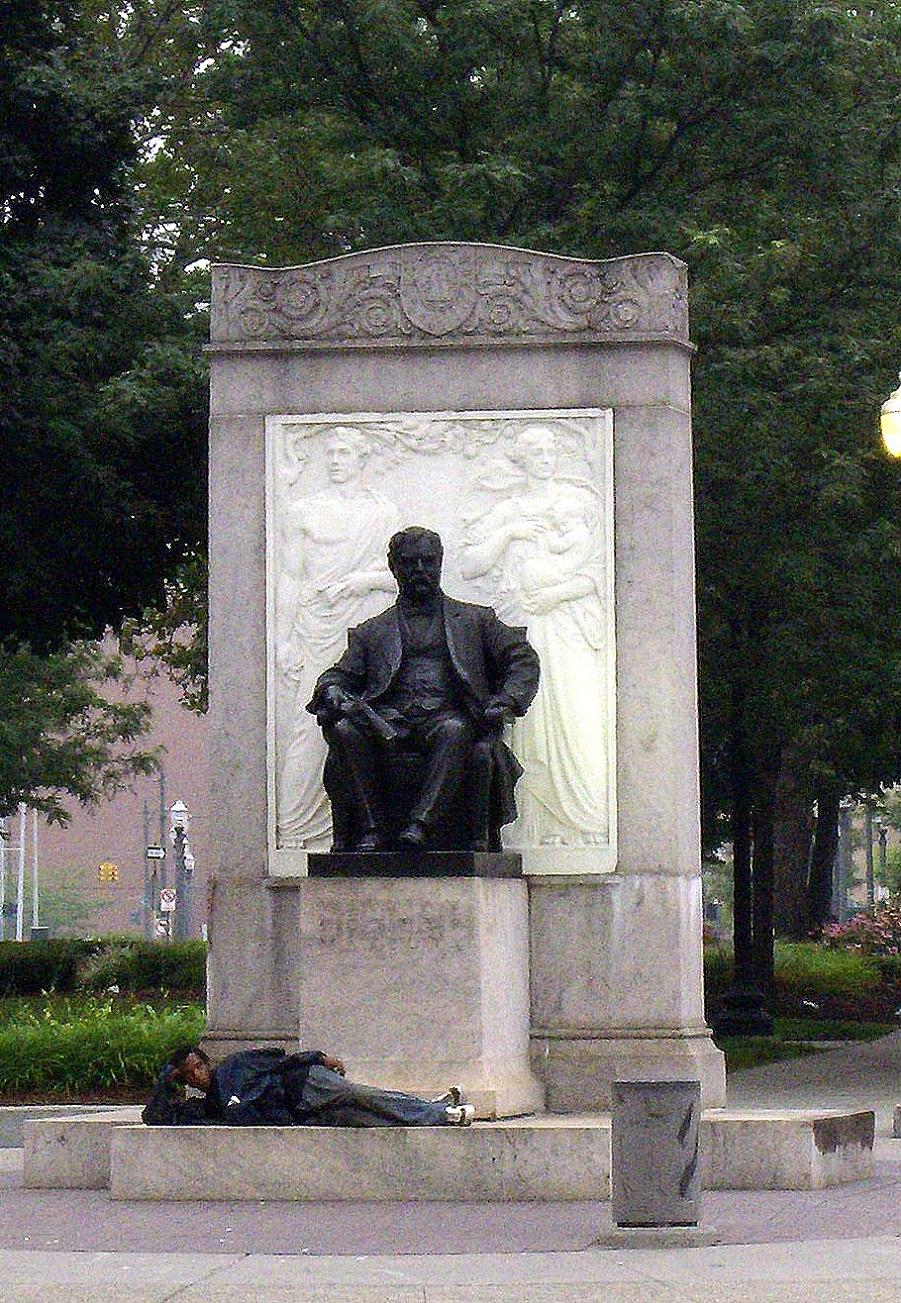
Detroit Mayor William C. Maybury Monument

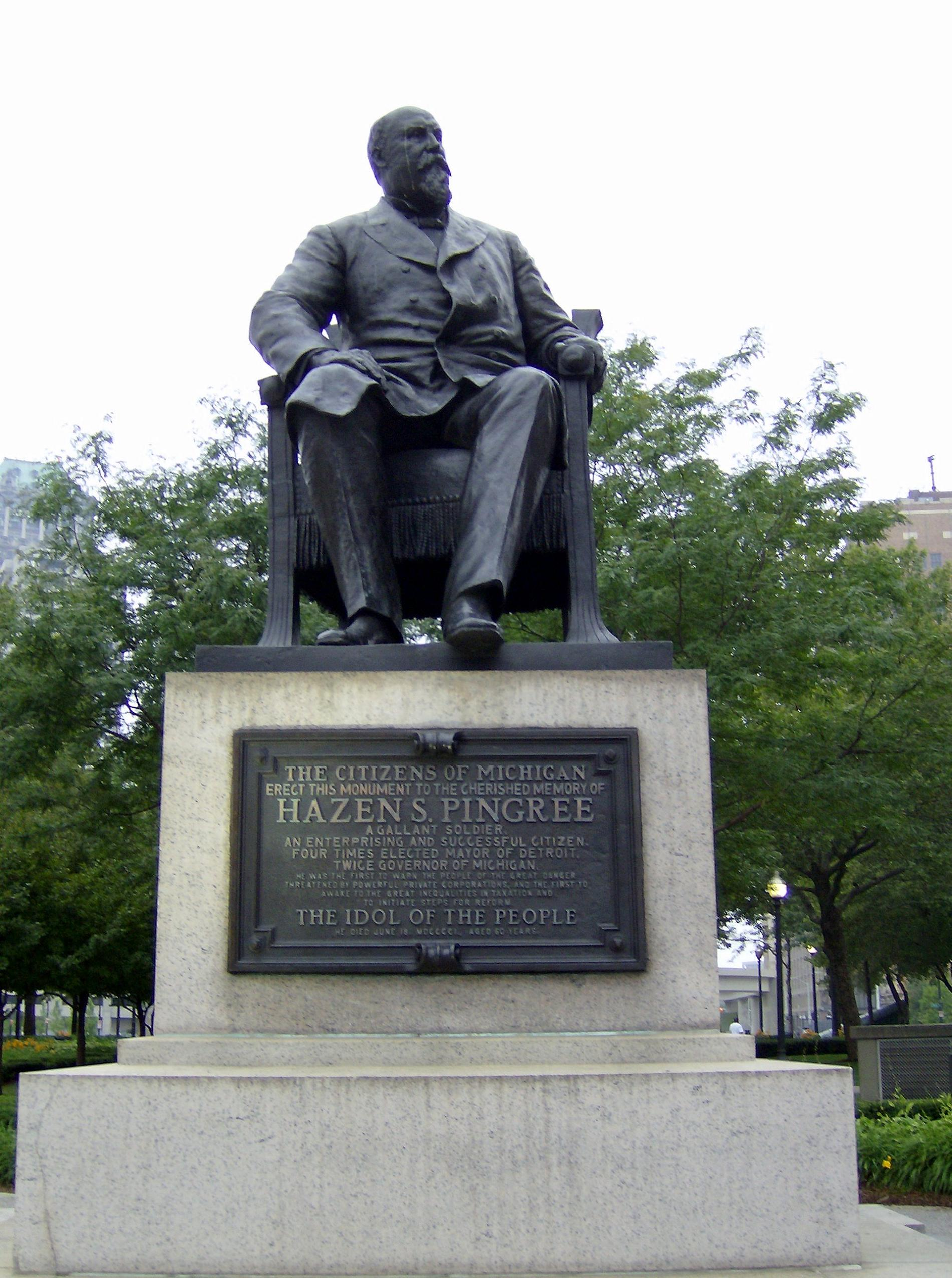
Hazen S. Pingree Monument

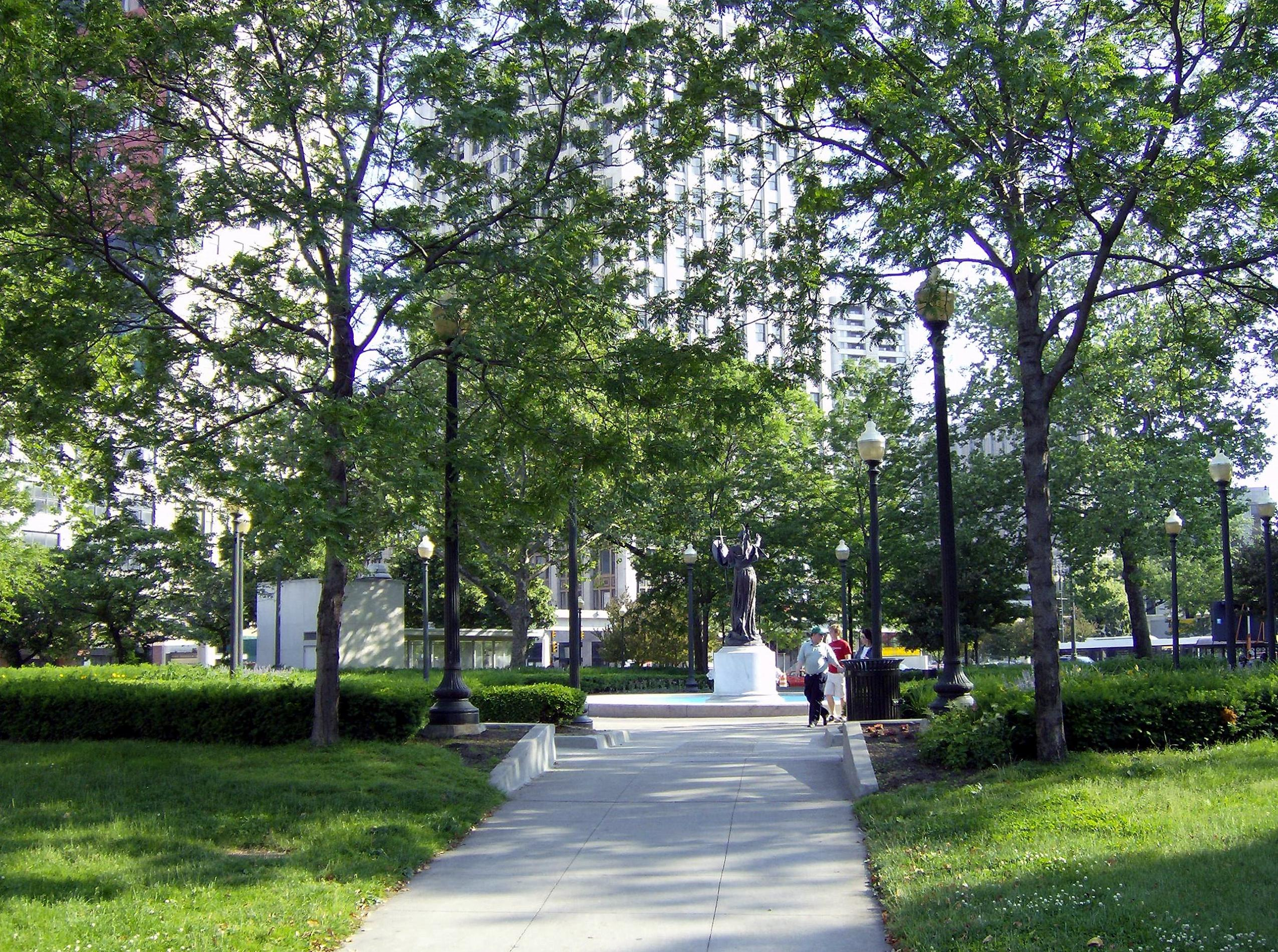
The central green of the park is a common lunch spot for office workers

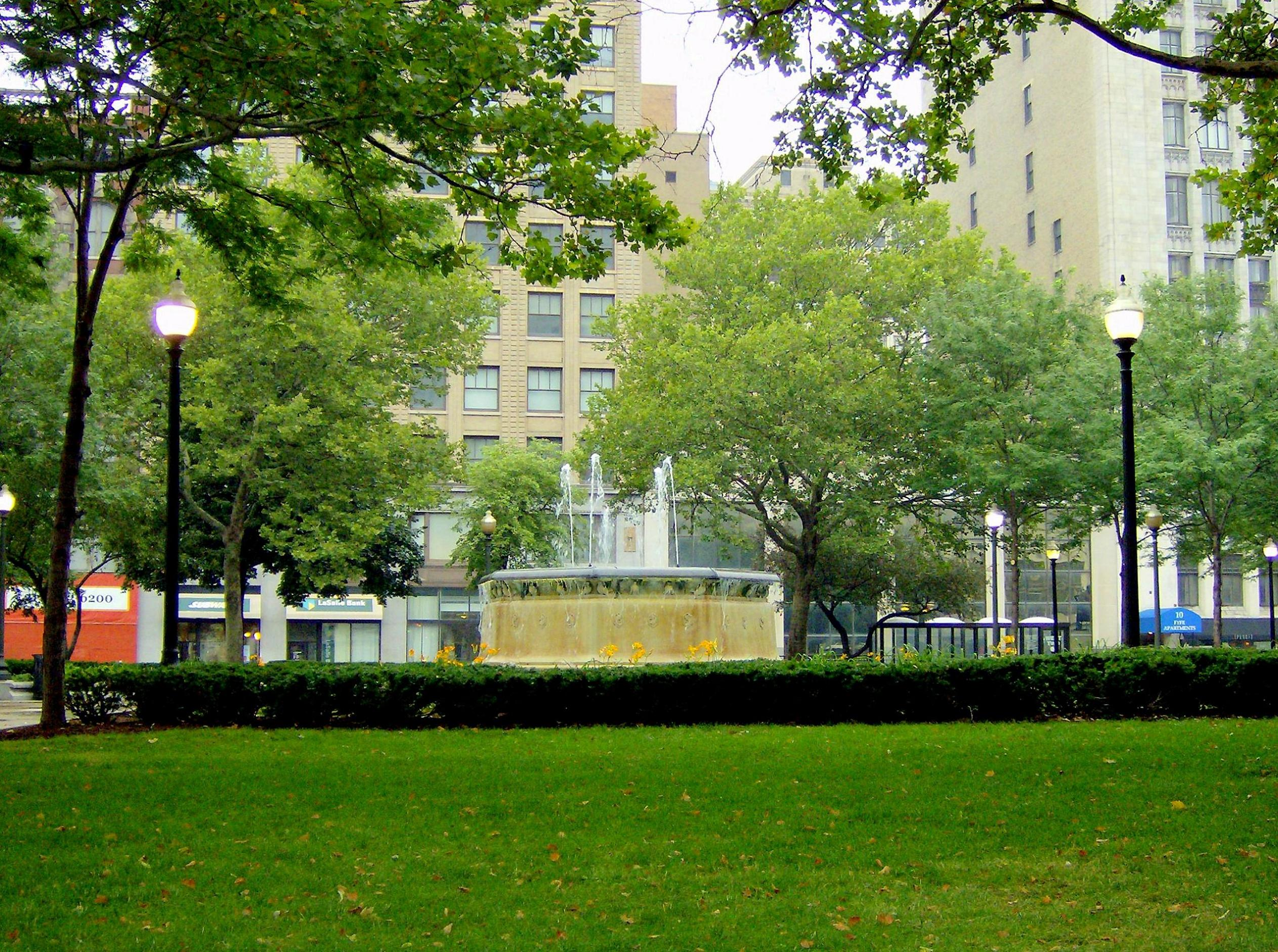
Grand Circus Park, looking north

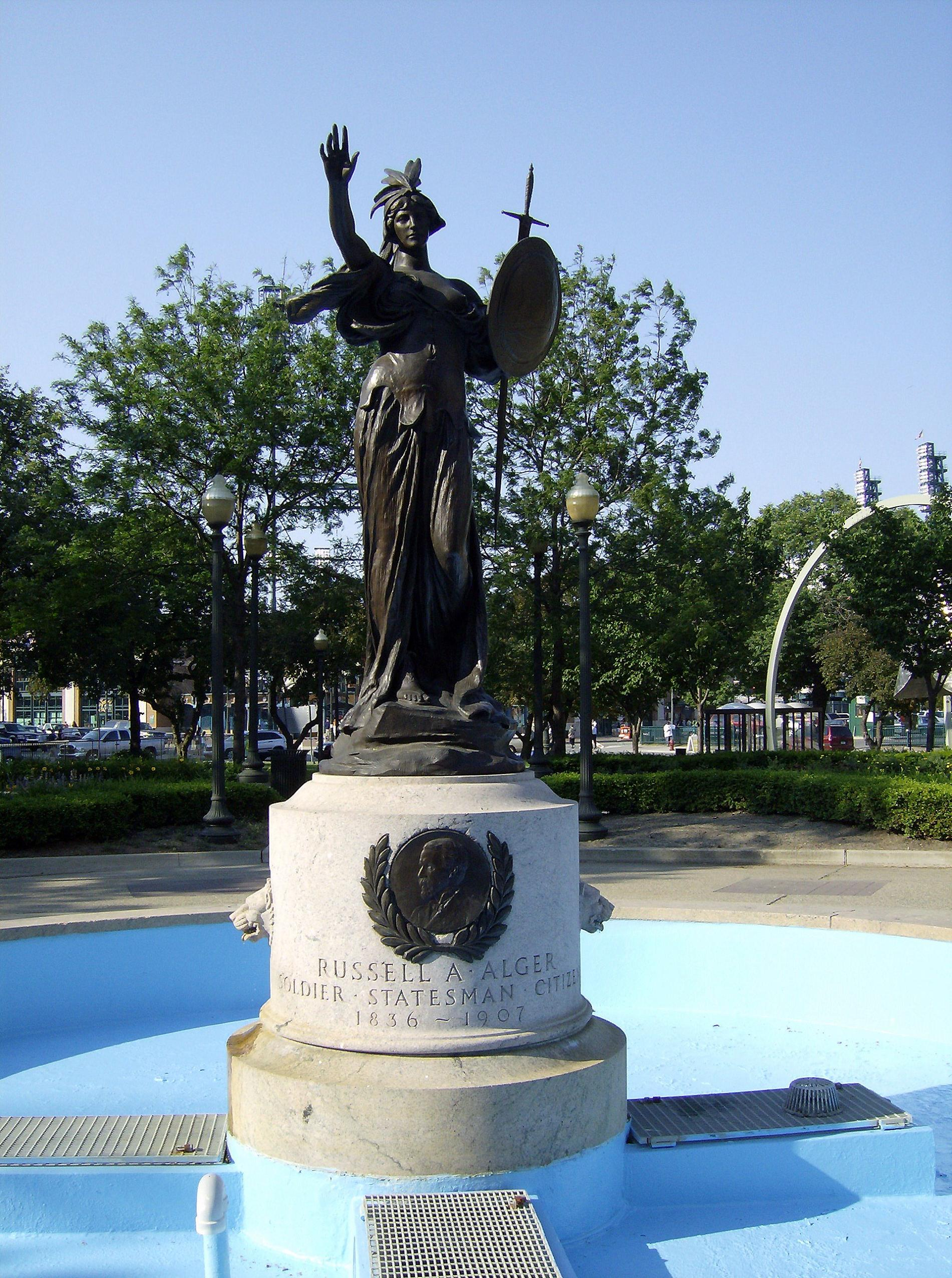
Russell Alger Memorial Fountain is the only Daniel Chester French work in Detroit

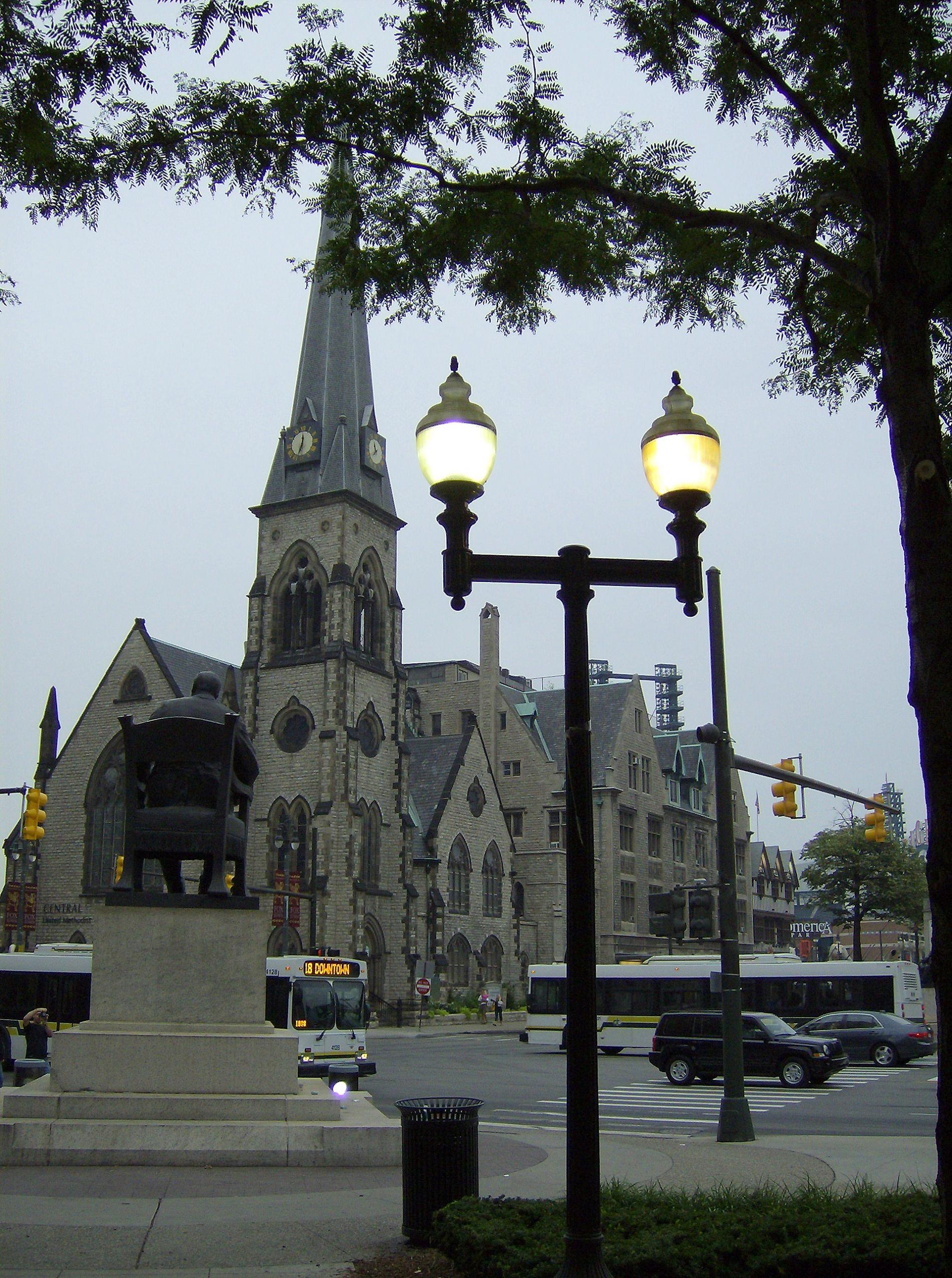
Central United Methodist Church, in Victorian gothic style, overlooks Grand Circus Park

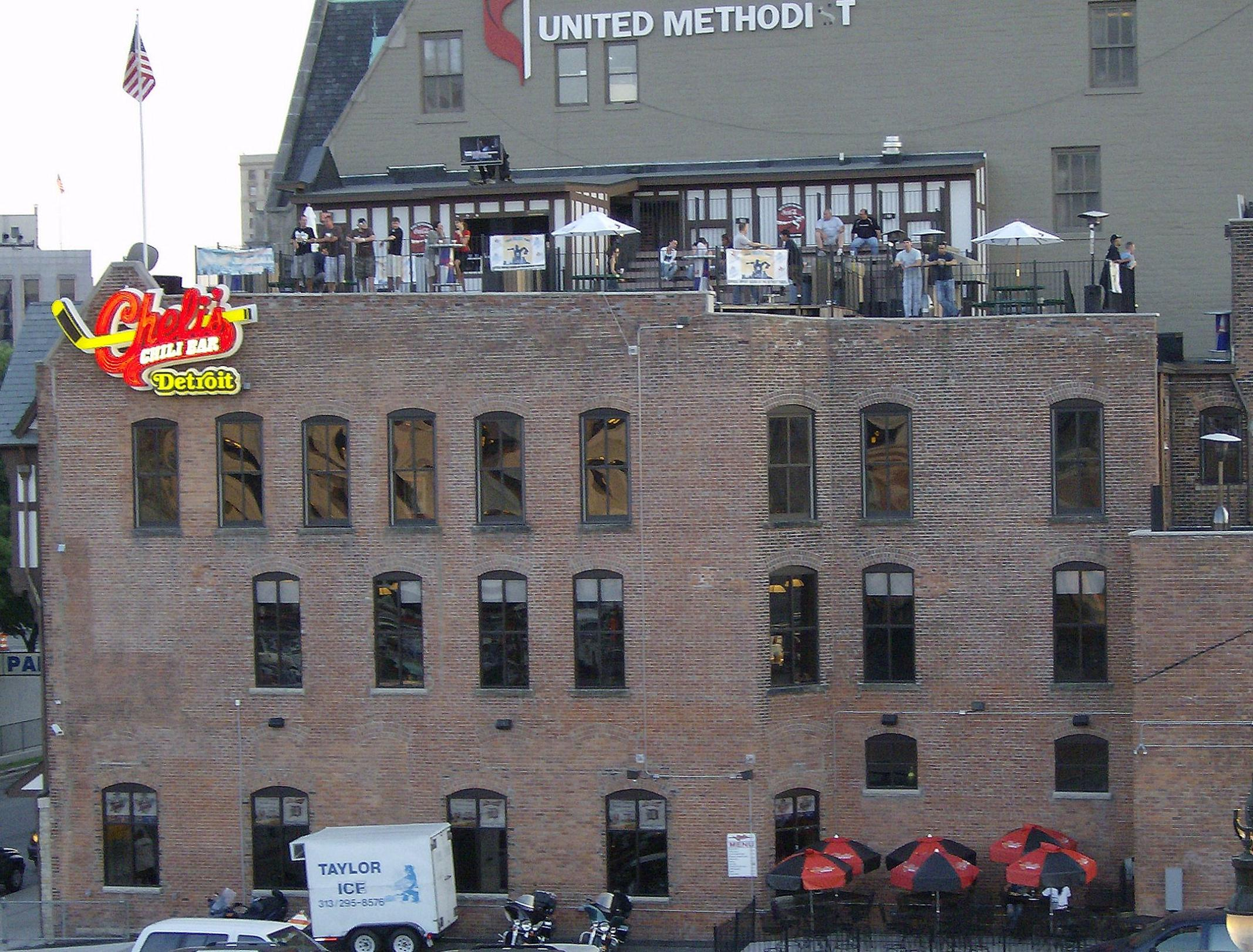
Cheli's Chili Bar on West Adams Street overlooking Comerica Park

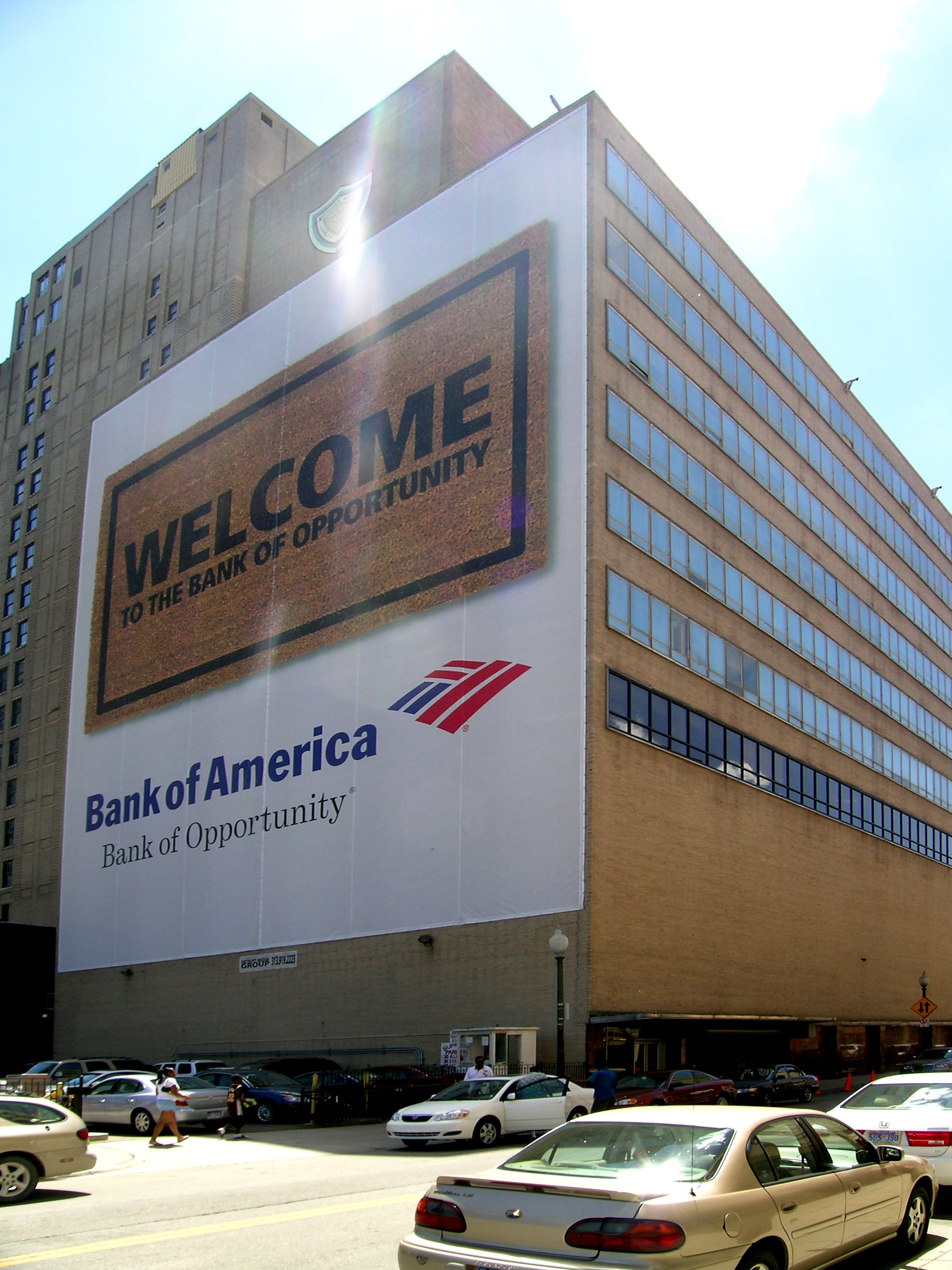
The building at 25 West Elizabeth, part of the Michigan Mutual Liability Company Complex

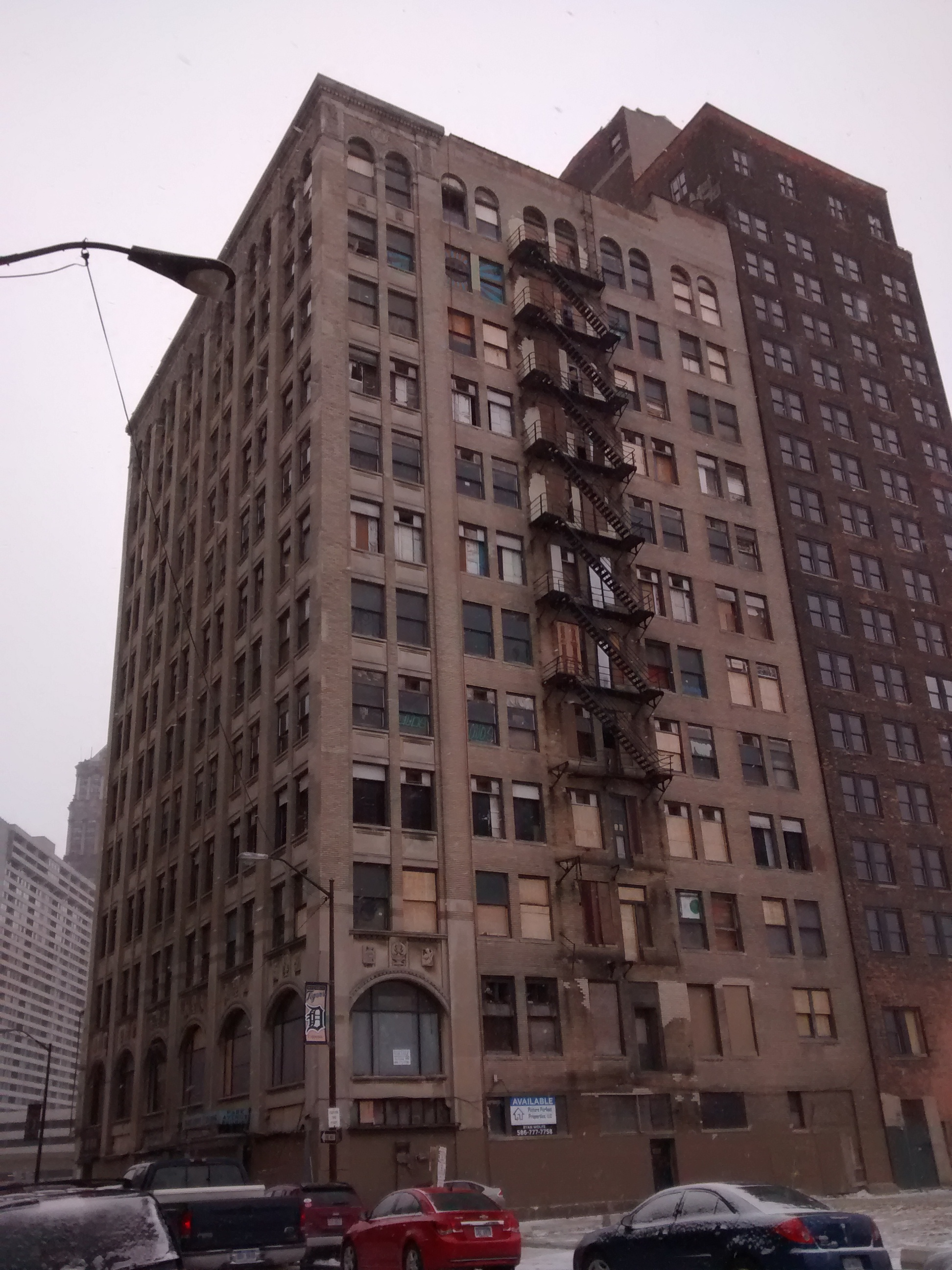
Park Avenue Building

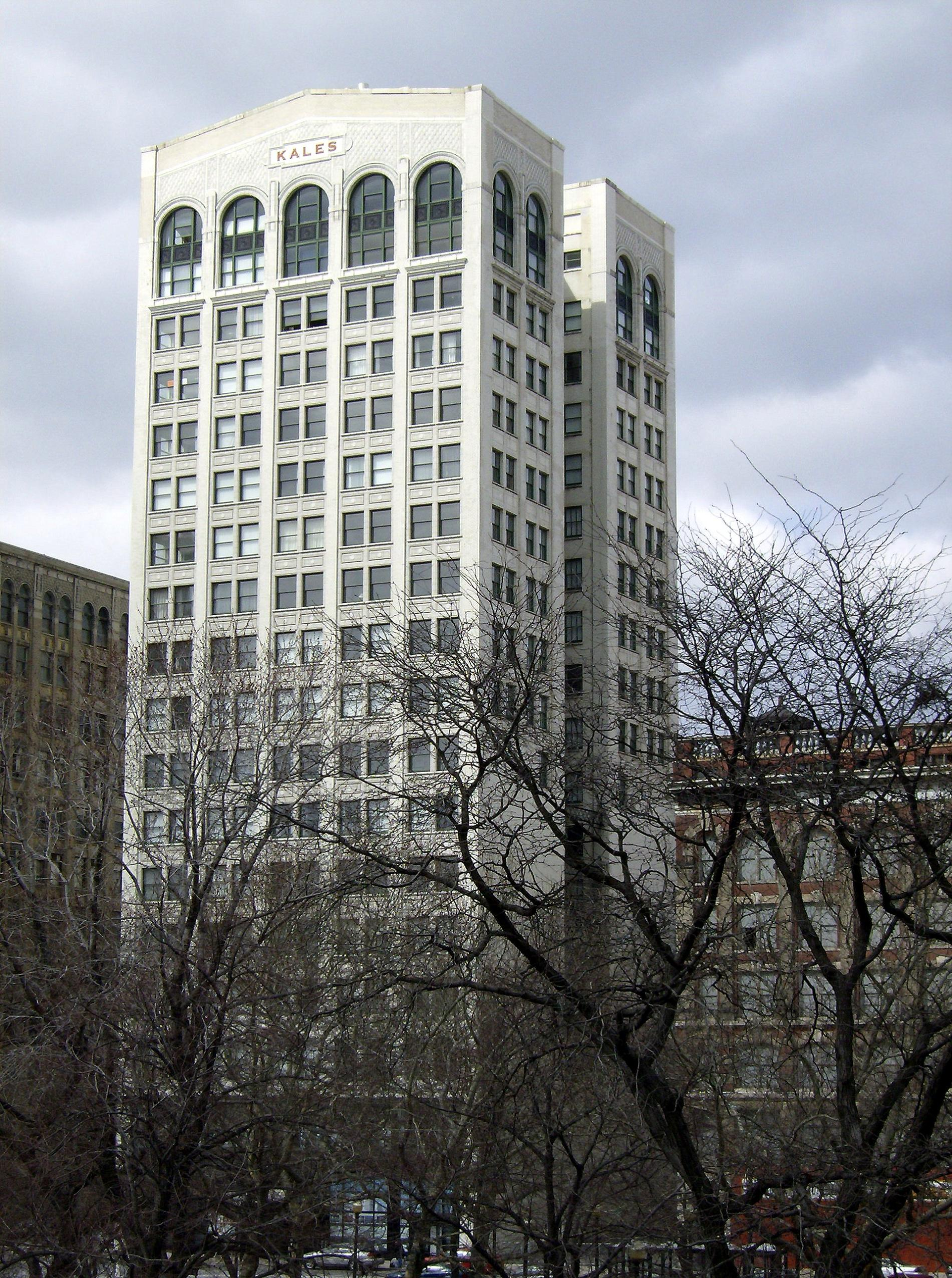
Kales Building

== See also ==
- Campus Martius Park
- Detroit International Riverfront
- Grand Circus Park People Mover station
- Theatre in Detroit
