= David Broderick Tower =

Skyscraper in Detroit

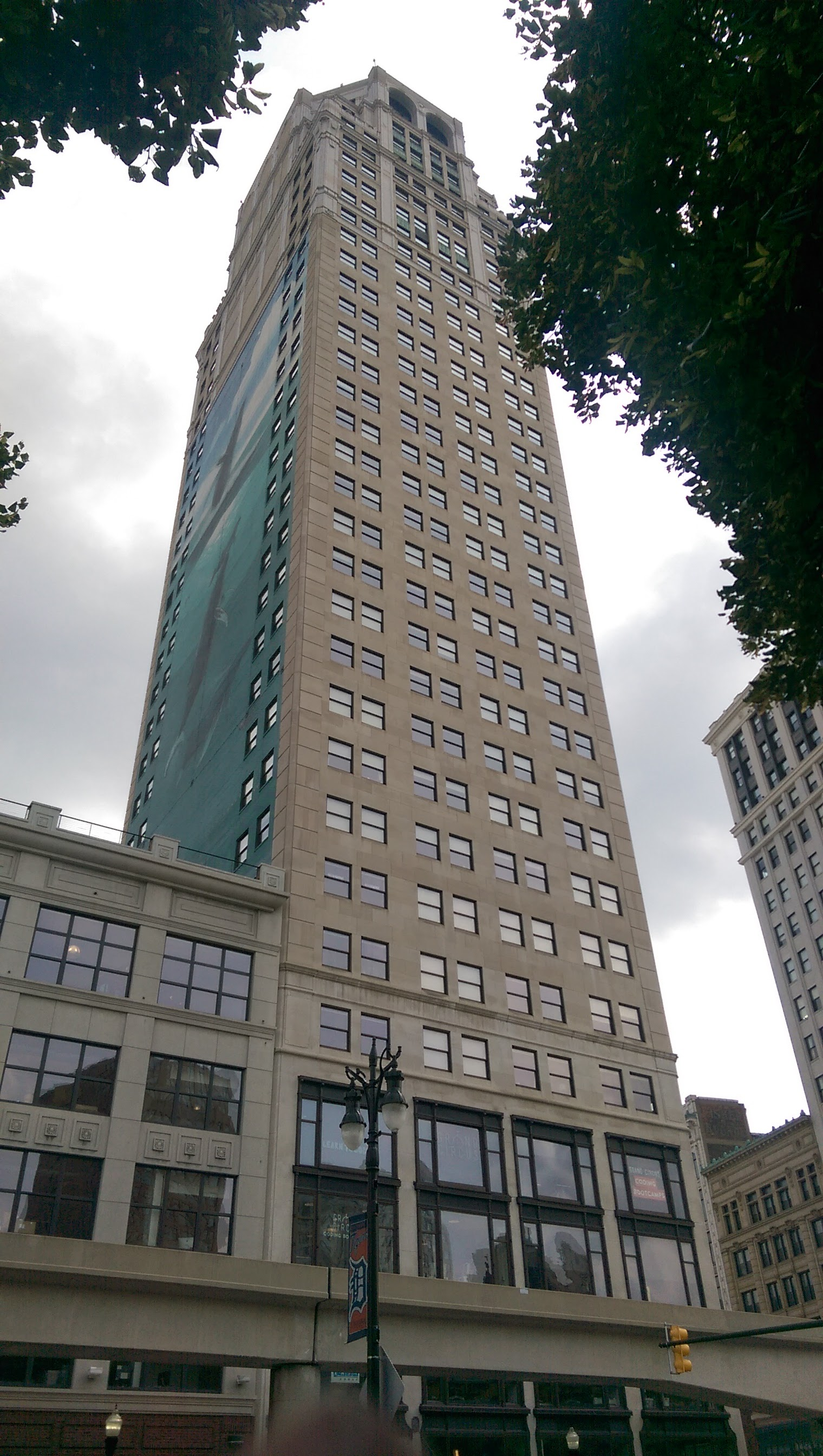
- Interactive map of the David Broderick Tower area
- Former names: Eaton Tower (1928–1945)

General information
- Type: Residential
- Location: 10 Witherell Street; Detroit, Michigan
- Coordinates: 42°20′9.5″N 83°2′59″W
- Construction started: 1926
- Completed: 1928
- Renovated: 2012

Height
- Roof: 369 ft (112 m)
- Top floor: 348 ft (106 m)

Technical details
- Floor count: 34

Design and construction
- Architects: Louis Kamper; Paul Kamper

Other information
- Public transit: Grand Circus Park; Grand Circus; SMART FAST Woodward 461, 462; DDOT 4 D2A2
- Broderick Tower
- U.S. Historic district – Contributing property
- Part of: Grand Circus Park Historic District (ID83000894)
- Designated CP: February 28, 1983

The Broderick Tower is a residential tower in Downtown Detroit, Michigan. Original construction began in 1926, and was completed in 1928. The Broderick was fully renovated in 2012 by JC Beal Construction Inc., who also served as the developer. The tower was the second tallest building in Michigan when it was originally completed in 1928. It stands 34-stories, with two basement floors. The building is designed with Neo-classical architecture, Chicago school, and Beaux-Arts designs. Limestone is a prominent material in the building's surface. It was designed by architects Louis Kamper and Paul Kamper for Theodore Eaton.

The tower is located at the Southeast corner of Woodward Avenue and Witherell Street, facing Grand Circus Park, and stands across the street from the David Whitney Building. The Broderick Tower is not a square, or even a parallelogram in shape.

== History ==
Before the decorative cornices were removed, this building was 371'-6" to the top of the parapet wall, and 376'-7" tall to the very tip of the decorative cornice. This tower is topped by a Beaux-Arts/Neoclassical inspired crown.

The tower was originally constructed as the Eaton Tower, named after Theodore Horation Eaton, Jr., an importer and dealer in chemicals and dyes. The building changed ownership and names in 1945, when the tower was purchased by David Broderick, a Detroit insurance broker, which he then renamed after himself. After his purchase of the tower in 1945, David Broderick created the Sky Top Club on the 33rd floor of the tower, which was a private club used for entertaining Mr. Broderick's associates and guests. After David Broderick's death in 1957, the tower changed hands many times between 1963 and 1976, finally ending up in the hands of the Higgins family, which retains a stake in the ownership to this day.

A bar called Tavern on the Park was preceded by a restaurant called The Flaming Embers, which also later closed. Another bar called The Pit Stop opened on the ground floor of the building in 2007 but eventually also closed. Currently the Detroit Sports Bar & Grille occupies the street level floor.

The memorable humpback whale mural on the rear façade of the building was painted by Metro Detroit native eco-artist, Wyland, and was dedicated on October 13, 1997. A billboard was placed over the mural in July 2006, covering up the Whaling Wall mural. The money generated from a recently added billboard was announced to benefit the restoration of the building, as the billboard is visible from the nearby Comerica Park, home of the Detroit Tigers. In June 2010, the billboard was removed during a storm, once again revealing the mural.

In September 2009, the Broderick Tower was listed as one of the world's tallest abandoned structures.

Motown Construction Partners LLC, led by Fred J. Beal, Manager, and President of JC Beal Construction Inc., secured $55 million in financing for a comprehensive re-development of the Broderick Tower in December 2010. Renovations commenced to create 124 apartments on floors 5-34, three separate restaurant venues floor 1 and the adjacent lower level and mezzanine, and office space on floors 2 through 4.

On November 2, 2012, the Broderick Tower received official certificates of occupancy by the City of Detroit. A call was made to residents by management around 3:30 PM; on that day, at least 5 residents moved in immediately. During that same weekend, at least 50 more residents moved in. As of March 2013, Broderick Tower is 100% leased and occupied.

In 2021, Rocket Companies replaced the iconic whale mural by Robert Wyland on the Broderick Tower with a new mural by Detroit artist Phillip Simpson. This change was part of an initiative to feature local artists in prominent city locations. The new mural, titled "Smiles," showcases Simpson's colorful and recognizable style and aims to celebrate Detroit's vibrant art scene. However, in 2023, a storm damaged the advertisement covering the mural, revealing the beloved whale mural underneath and sparking discussions about preserving public art in the city.

In October 2025, a Metro Detroit-based businessman proposed to buy the Broderick Tower for $45.6 million.

== Gallery ==
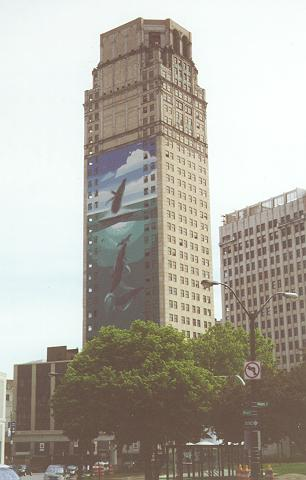
The Broderick Tower featuring Wyland's whale mural (2001)

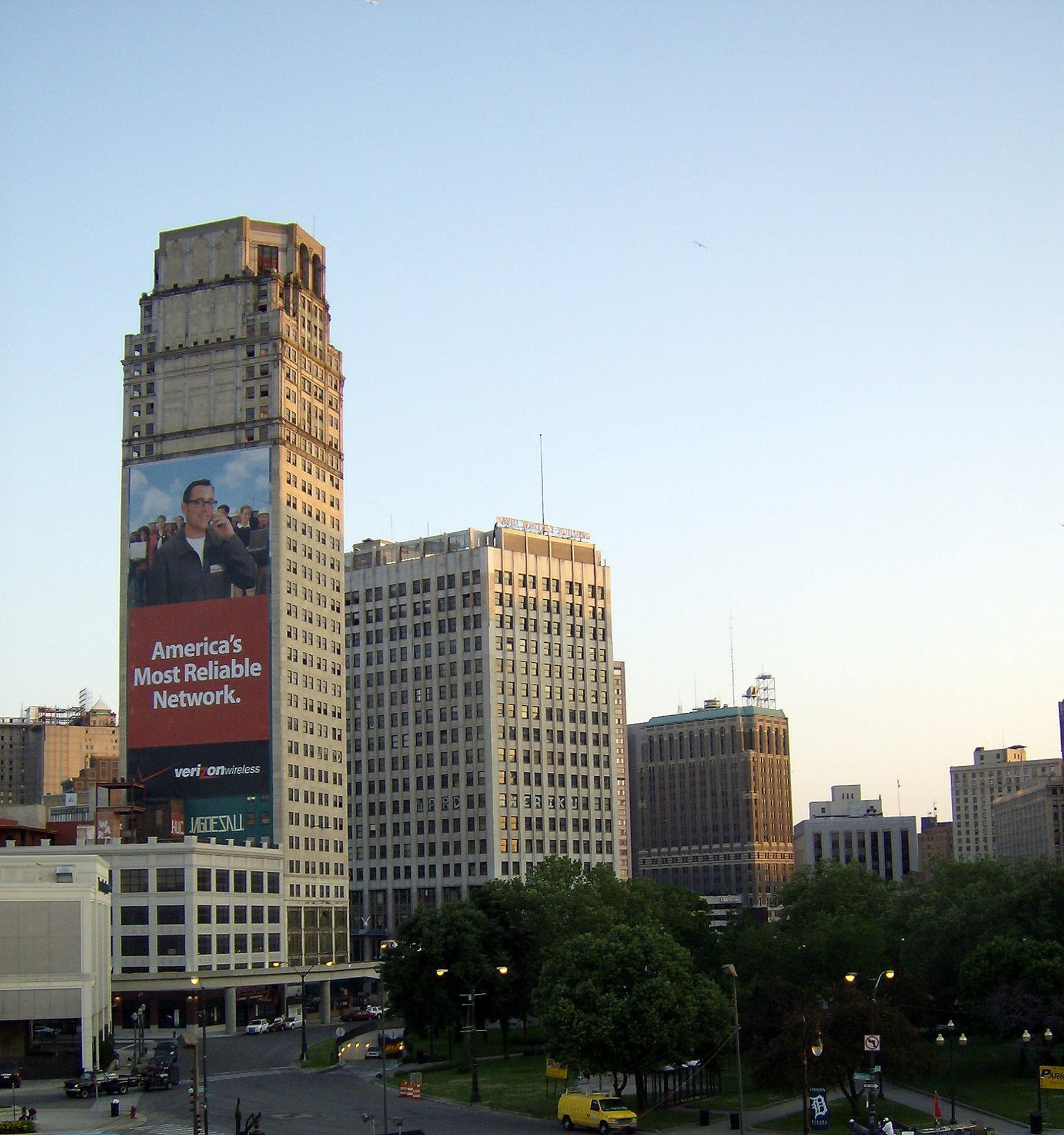
The Broderick Tower's whale mural replaced by advertising (2007)

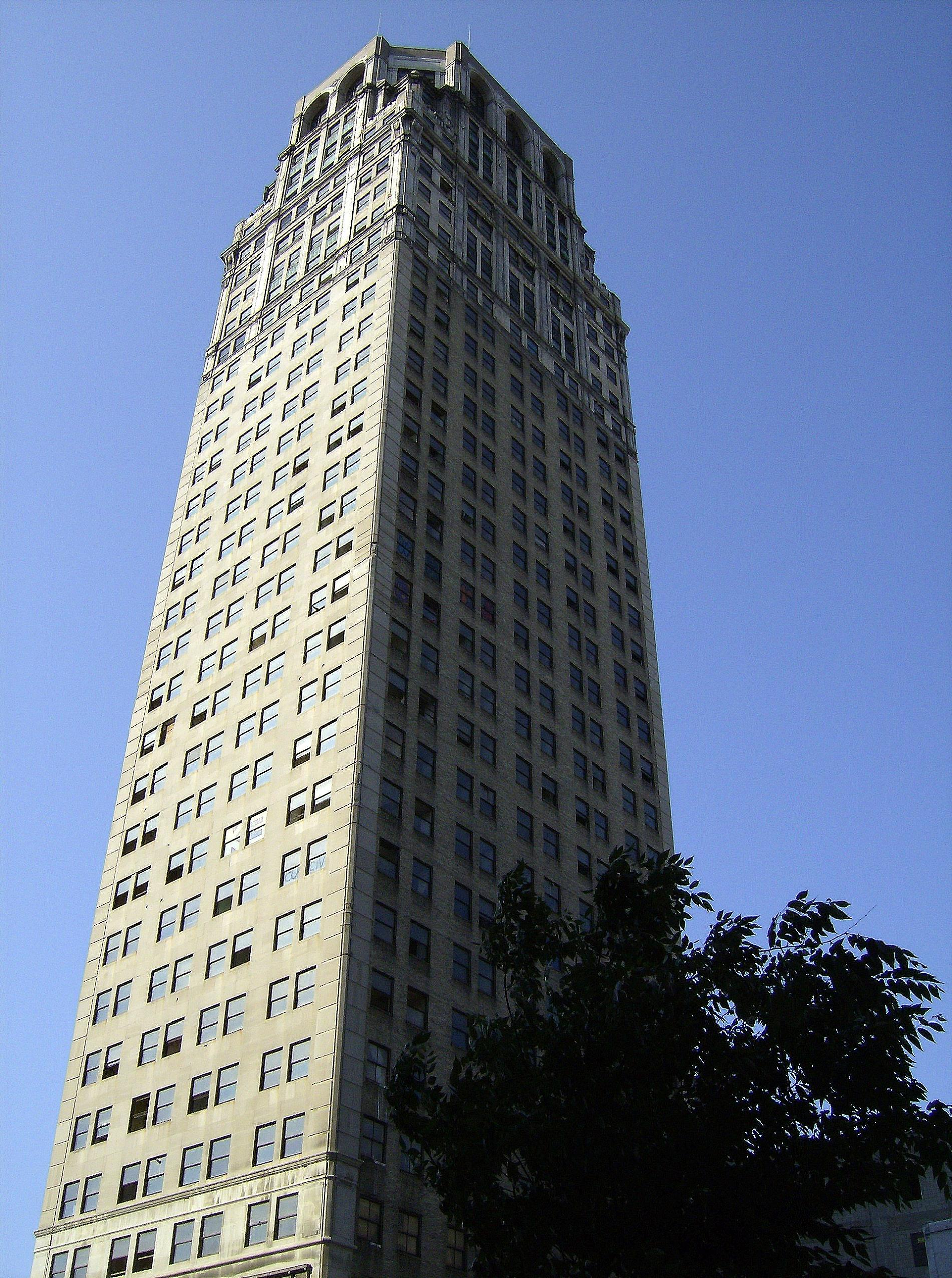
The Broderick Tower prior to renovation (2007).

== See also ==
- List of tallest buildings in Detroit
