= David Whitney Building =

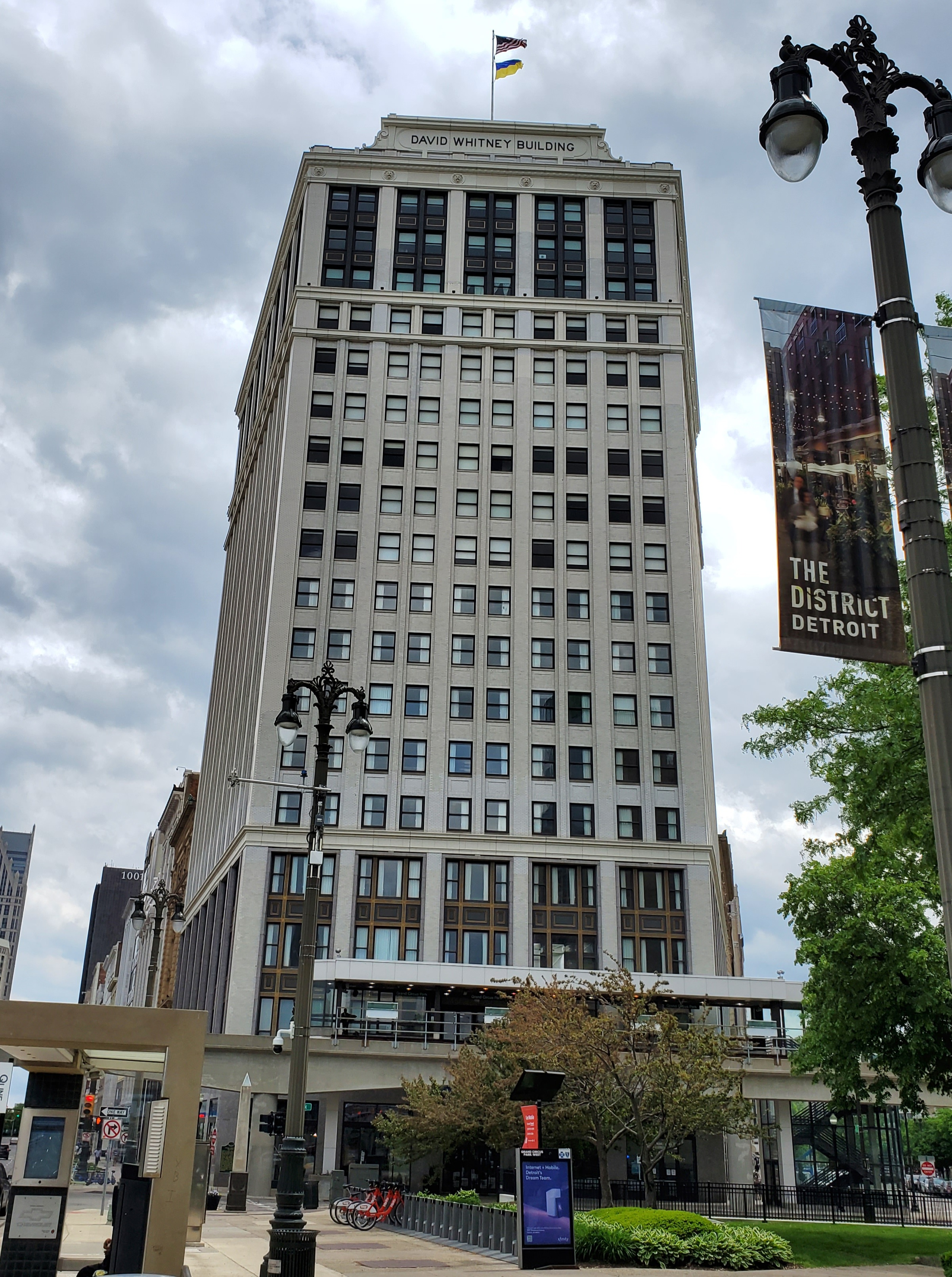
- The building in 2022
- Interactive map of the David Whitney Building area

General information
- Type: residential/hotel
- Architectural style: Neo-Renaissance
- Location: 1 Park Avenue; Detroit, Michigan
- Coordinates: 42°20′8.5″N 83°3′1.5″W
- Completed: 1915
- Renovated: 1959, 2014

Height
- Antenna spire: 292 ft (89 m)
- Roof: 272 ft (83 m)
- Top floor: 262 ft (80 m)

Technical details
- Floor count: 19

Design and construction
- Architecture firm: Graham, Burnham & Co.

Renovating team
- Renovating firm: Roxbury Group, Trans Inn Management

Other information
- Public transit: Grand Circus Park; Grand Circus
- David Whitney Building
- U.S. Historic district – Contributing property
- Part of: Grand Circus Park Historic District (ID83000894)
- Designated CP: February 28, 1983

The David Whitney Building is a historic building located at 1 Park Avenue (1550 Woodward Avenue from 1921 to 2014), on the northern edge of Downtown Detroit, Michigan, within the Grand Circus Park Historic District. The building stands on a wedge-shaped site at the junction of Park Avenue, Woodward Avenue, and Washington Boulevard. Construction on the 19-floor structure began in 1914.

== History and description ==
The building is named for David Whitney Jr., a wealthy Detroiter who earned millions of dollars as a lumber baron dealing in white pine; his father was said to be the employer of Paul Bunyan. The structure was designed by Graham, Burnham & Co., the successor firm to the D.H. Burnham Company. It may be said that the building was designed in the "Daniel Burnham style", or perhaps, "inspired by Daniel Burnham". The first assertion that Daniel Burnham himself designed the building was made in a 1950s press article about the building's modernization, probably a misreading (or embellishment). Burnham died in 1912, two years before the project was announced, and no contemporary record gives any indication that he was involved with the design of the building prior to his death.

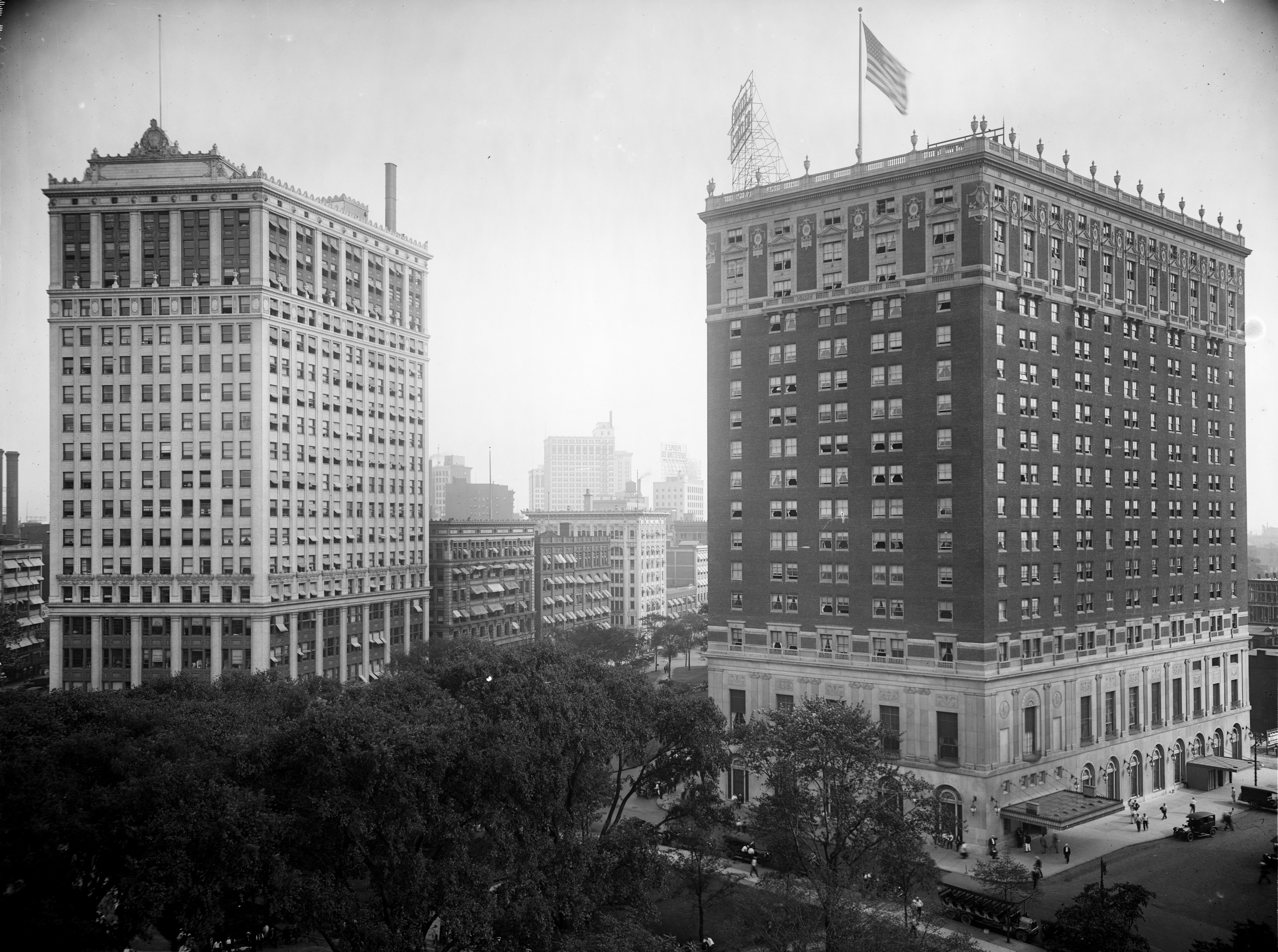
Whitney Building prior to modernization (left) and Statler Hotel, c. 1915

The exterior was originally styled with clean lines in a Neo-Renaissance style faced with terra cotta and glazed brick. The original façade was altered in 1959, when decorative cornices were replaced with a 'modern' top. The first four stories of this building contain a large retail atrium. It was one of Detroit's first major mixed-use projects and was a popular location for many medical offices. The Metro Times, an early alternative weekly, was once published from offices in the highrise. There are 19 floors housing office and retail space with a two-story mechanical penthouse at the rear of the building. The Detroit People Mover's Grand Circus Park station is located at the first and second floors of this building.

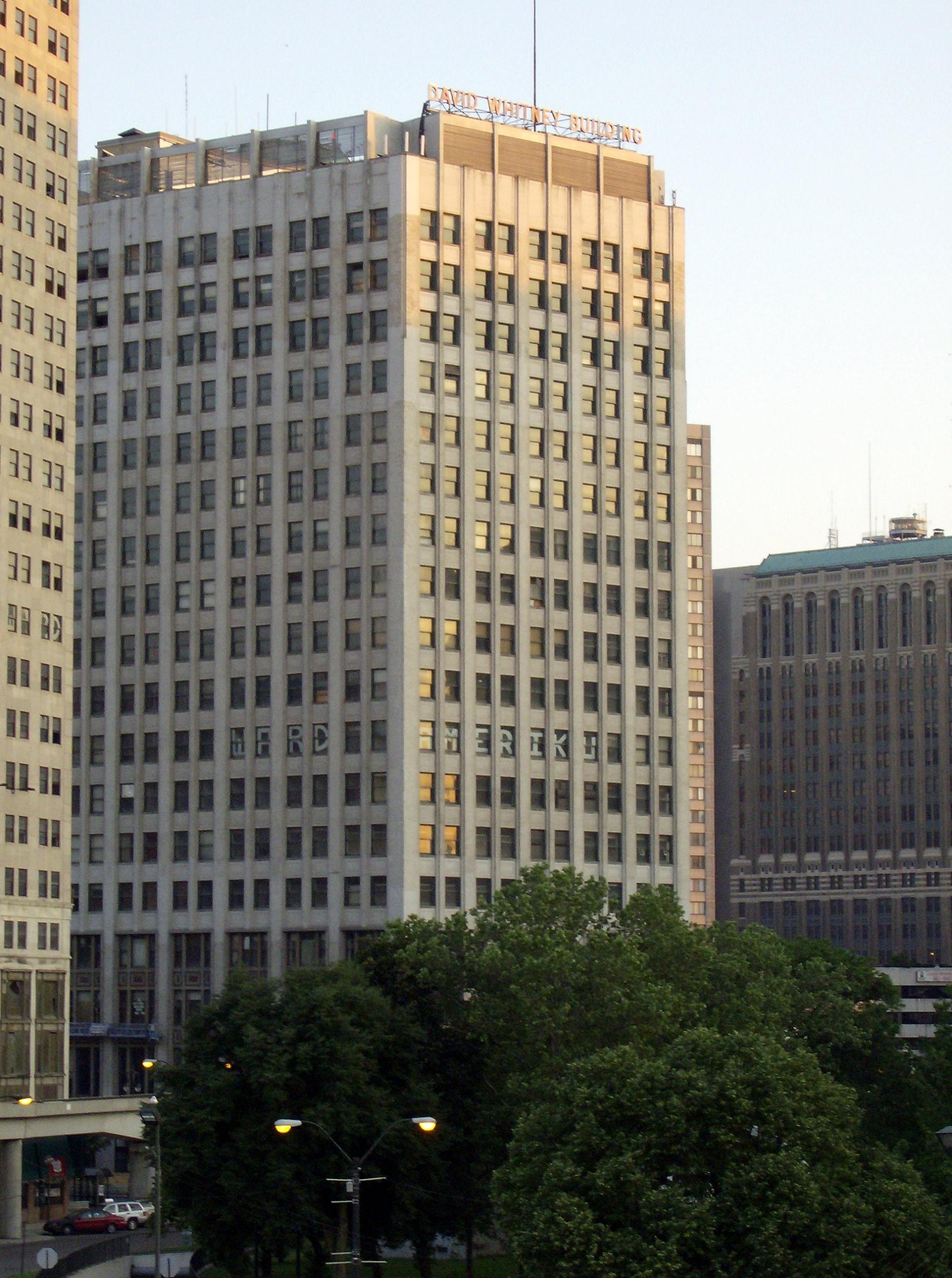
The Whitney Building in 2007, before restoration of its facade

The David Whitney Building stands across Woodward Avenue from the David Broderick Tower. The building is visible from the Detroit People Mover, as well as Comerica Park. Together with the adjacent Broderick Tower, it forms a "gateway" of sorts to downtown Detroit when viewed from the north.

== Renovation ==
In January 2011, the Detroit Downtown Development Authority approved a $1 million loan to help Whitney Partners LLC purchase and renovate the building. Their plan included creating a mixed-use building and restoring the decorative exterior elements that were removed in 1959 and the four-story lobby. The purchase was completed in March for $3.3 million and the new owners sought additional funding and tax credits to finance their plans for a boutique hotel, apartments and retail. In December 2011, plans moved another step when the partnership announced it signed an agreement with Aloft Hotels to operate the 136-room hotel. The hotel occupies floors three through nine of the building with 105 high-end apartment units on floors ten and above. The $92 million renovation began in March 2013 and was completed in December 2014.

In May 2022 owner, The Roxbury Group, announced another renovation which would redesign the hotel's 136 current rooms and convert apartments on the tenth and eleventh floors into 24 additional rooms leaving 80 apartment units on floors 12-19. In addition, the hotel will drop the Aloft branding to become part of Marriott's Autograph Collection. Owners also plan to upgrade the lobby bar and create a restaurant in what is now event space.

== See also ==
- David Broderick Tower
- Grand Circus Park Historic District
