= Heather Nabozny =

American groundskeeper (born 1970)

Heather Nabozny (born July 27, 1970) is an American groundskeeper. She has been the head groundskeeper of the Detroit Tigers' Comerica Park since it opened in 2000, becoming the first female head groundskeeper in the history of Major League Baseball.

On September 5, 2014 Nabozny badly injured her leg as the Comerica Park grounds crew attempted to cover the field during a severe storm during a game between the Tigers and San Francisco Giants. She underwent surgery on her knee and managed her grounds crew's preparation for the American League Division Series between the Tigers and Baltimore Orioles one month after her injury with her leg in a cast.

== Early life ==
Nabozny was born in Milford, Michigan. Her father Louis, who worked 30 years at Ford Motor Company, started a lawn care business when she was 10. She used to work for her father during the summer. She grew up as a Tigers fan and attended games at Tiger Stadium with her father.

She studied sports turf-management at the Michigan State University and graduated in 1993. She started her career with the Toronto Blue Jays at their spring training complex in Dunedin, Florida. She was named head groundskeeper for the Detroit Tigers prior to the 1999 season, the Tigers' last at Tiger Stadium. She was the youngest head groundskeeper in Major League Baseball at the time at 28 years of age.

== See also ==
- Comerica Park
