= Detroit Downtown Trolley =

Former downtown heritage trolley in Detroit

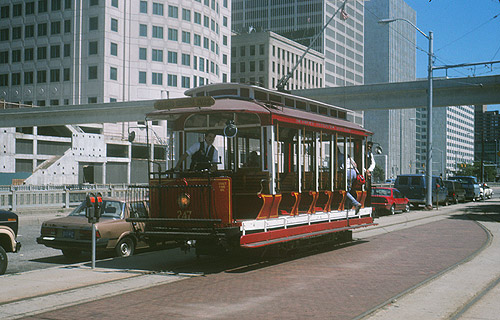
- Trolley #247 stopped at the Jefferson Avenue passing siding, Detroit People Mover track overhead in the background

Overview
- Owner: Detroit Department of Transportation
- Area served: Downtown Detroit
- Locale: Detroit, Michigan; United States
- Transit type: Heritage Streetcar

Operation
- Began operation: September 20, 1976
- Ended operation: June 21, 2003
- Operator: Detroit Department of Transportation
- Character: Pedestrian mall, sidewalk right-of-way
- Number of vehicles: 9

Technical
- System length: 1 mi (1.6 km)
- Track gauge: 900 mm (2 ft 11 7/16 in)
- Electrification: Overhead trolley wire

The Detroit Downtown Trolley, also known as the Washington Boulevard Trolley and Detroit Citizens Railway, was a heritage trolley line in Downtown Detroit, Michigan, United States. The narrow-gauge system opened September 20, 1976, as a United States Bicentennial project, and was closed on June 21, 2003. The line was operated and maintained by the Detroit Department of Transportation (DDOT).

== History and route ==
Built as part of a project to revitalize Washington Boulevard, the 0.75-mile (1.21 km) line initially connected Grand Circus Park at the north and Cobo Center near the Detroit Riverfront. Five blocks of Washington Boulevard were reconstructed as a pedestrian mall hosting the streetcar, with a passing track located at State Street. Near Congress Street, the line swapped to the west side of Washington Boulevard until terminating at Jefferson Avenue outside the Cobo Center. Opening celebrations hosted by city leaders and auto executives were held at the north end of the line during the afternoon of September 20, 1976. The streetcar was free the inaugural week, after which a fare of $0.25 (equivalent to $1.41 in 2025) was charged, covering the entire nine-block trip. Frequency was every 10 minutes along the line.

By 1979 the line was carrying 75,000 riders annually. In 1980 the line was extended 0.25 miles (0.40 km) east along Jefferson Avenue paralleling Hart Plaza to the Renaissance Center at Randolph street, adjacent to Mariners' Church and the Detroit–Windsor Tunnel. The entire system had cost $2.72 million (equivalent to $9.72 million in 2025); the original segment costing $1.5 million (equivalent to $5.36 million in 2025), including the $422,000 carhouse (equivalent to $1.51 million in 2025). Investment came from federal, state, and city sources.

=== Final years and closure ===
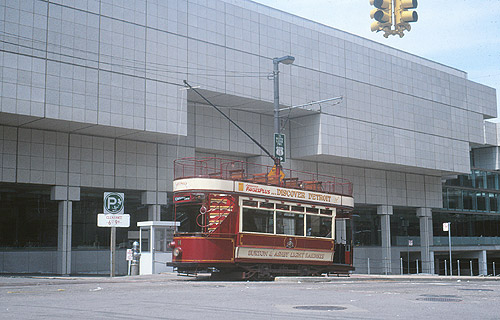
Double-decker car #14 at Cobo Center, 1991

The system saw a fare increase to $0.50. In 1997 the line only carried 3,350 riders, attributed to the popularity of the Detroit People Mover, with that system siphoning ridership after its opening in 1987. Despite the decline, local attitudes towards the system were generally positive, with a rehabilitation effort underway since 1996. By February 2001 only one car was in operation, operating every hour and resulting in intermittent suspensions. Track quality had deteriorated and the service was costing DDOT $300,000 a year to operate (equivalent to $520,151 in 2025). On January 15, 2003, two cars were shipped to Seattle for rehabilitation, with a third shipped later. However, in late June the line would indefinitely shut down. DDOT had decided to use a $20 million dollar grant (equivalent to $33.5 million in 2025) to rebuild Washington Boulevard for car traffic ahead of the 2006 Super Bowl.

== Stops ==
Stops were located approximately every block, with multiple stops serving Cobo Center and Hart Plaza. The trolley connected with the People Mover at Grand Circus Park station and Renaissance Center station.

In September 2001 the southern terminal was shortened to Woodward Avenue to accommodate a dedicated right-turn lane for the tunnel to Canada. In March 2002 one station became accessible with the construction of a ramp at Griswold Street and Hart Plaza. One of the vehicles sent for rehabilitation, car #247, was to have rebuilt bench seating that folded out of the way of wheelchairs.

== Rolling stock ==
The system originally intended to use standard gauge, but built to 900 mm (2 ft 11 7/16 in) gauge to take advantage of seven available Lisbon trams. Two more trolleys were later acquired, one from Vevey, Switzerland and a double-decker tram from Burton upon Trent, England. Trolleys were operated by DDOT employees, typically with a motorman and conductor.

== See also ==
- QLine, a modern streetcar operating in Detroit
- Waterfront Streetcar, a similar discontinued system in Seattle
