= Broadway station (Detroit) =

Detroit People Mover station

Broadway
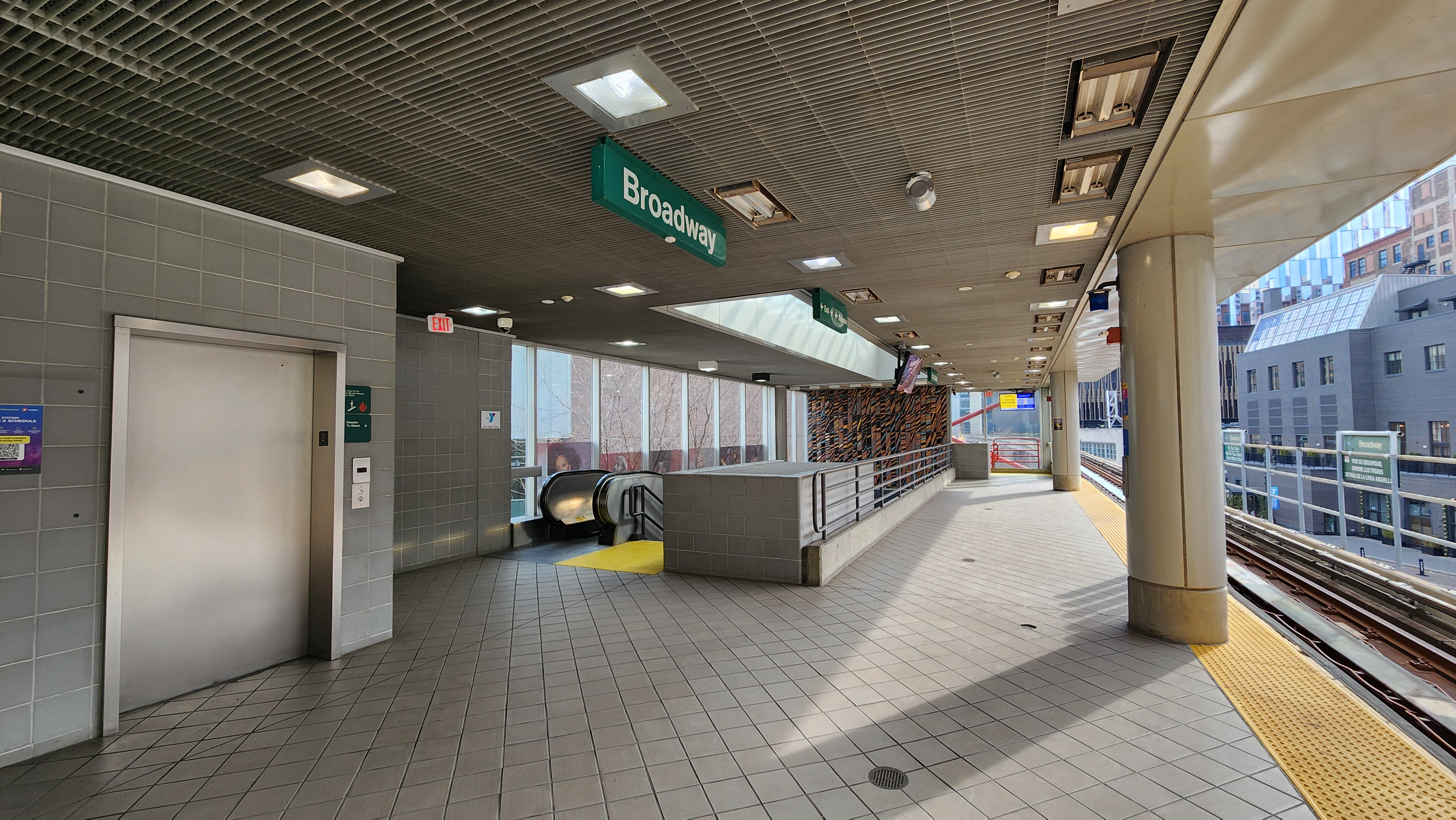
- Station platform

General information
- Location: 1441 Broadway Street; Detroit, Michigan 48226; United States
- Coordinates: 42°20′08″N 83°02′54″W
- Owner: Detroit Transportation Corporation
- Platforms: 1 side platform
- Tracks: 1

Construction
- Accessible: yes

History
- Opened: July 31, 1987

Services
Preceding station	Detroit People Mover	Following station
Cadillac Center One-way operation	Detroit People Mover	Grand Circus Park Next counter-clockwise
Location

Broadway station is a Detroit People Mover station in downtown Detroit, Michigan. It is located at the intersection of Broadway and John R Streets, taking its name from the former.

Broadway is the nearest People Mover station to Comerica Park, (Note: The Broadway and Grand Circus Park stations are roughly equidistant from Comerica Park, and are interchangeably referred to as the nearest station to the stadium in People Mover signage and communications.) Ford Field, the Detroit Athletic Club, the Detroit Opera House, Music Hall and the Boll Family YMCA.

== See also ==
- List of rapid transit systems
- List of United States rapid transit systems by ridership
- Metromover
- Transportation in metropolitan Detroit
