= List of Whaling Walls =

This is a list of Whaling Walls, which are large outdoor murals by the American artist Robert Wyland (b. 1956), featuring images of life-size gray whales, breaching humpback whales, blue whales, and other sea life. Whaling Walls (a pun on the Wailing Wall) are created by invitation of the communities, institutions, and building owners of the structures on which they are painted. His first mural was created in 1981, and Wyland's 100th Whaling Wall was painted in Beijing in 2008.

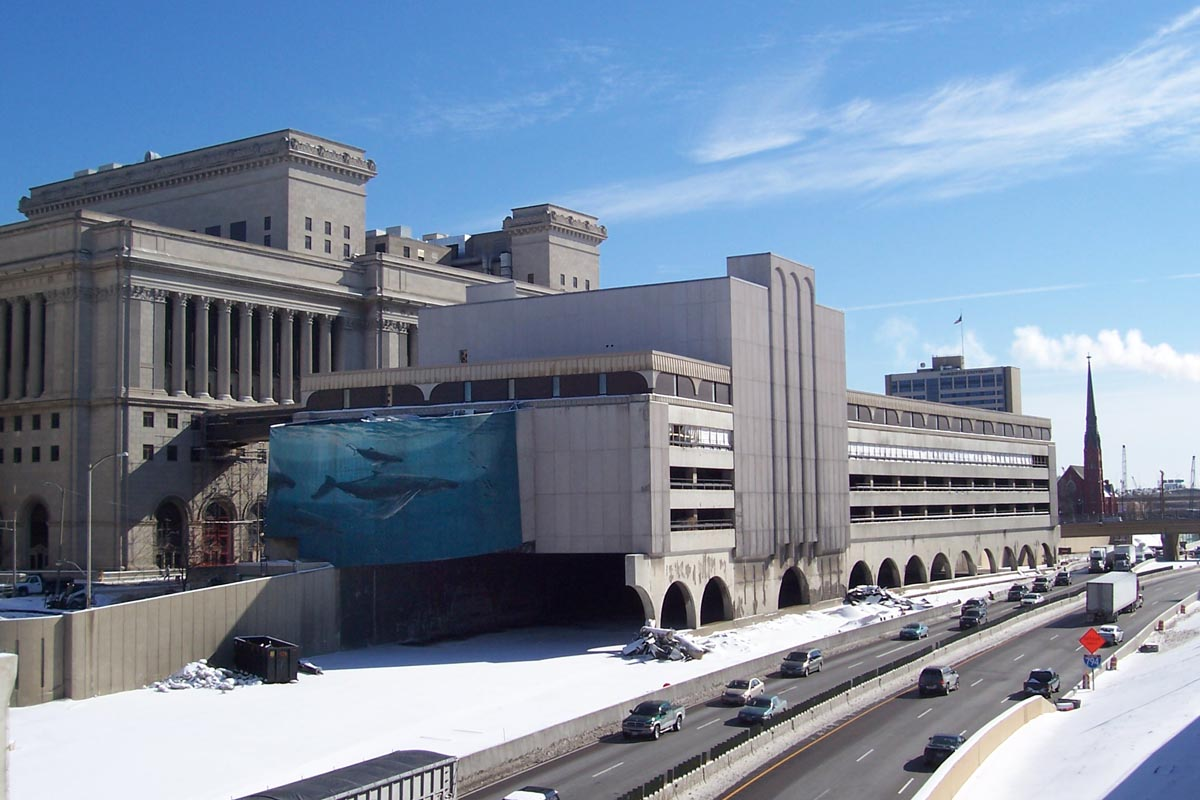
Whale Commuters, Milwaukee, Wisconsin USA

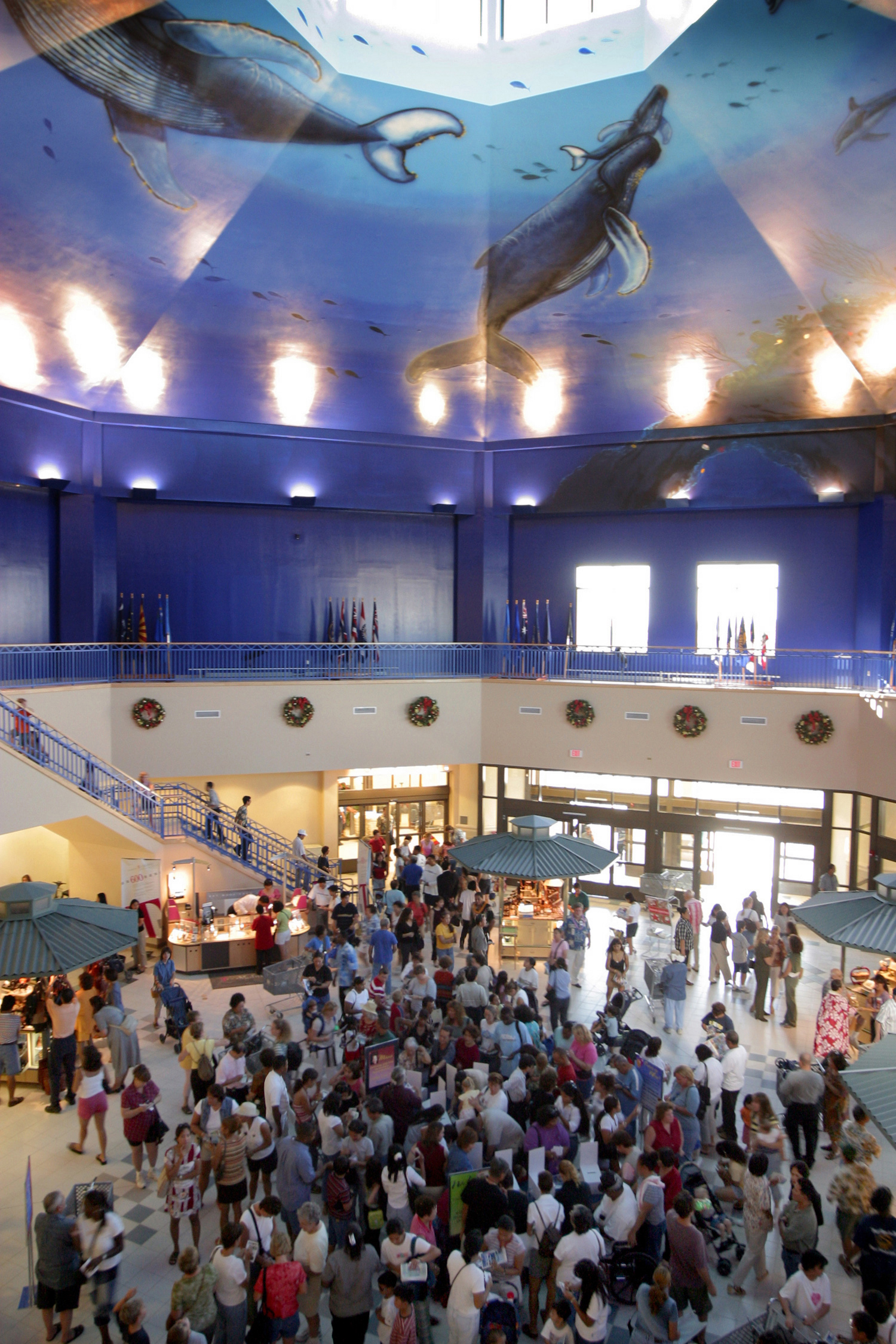
Humpback Realm, Pearl Harbor, Hawaii USA

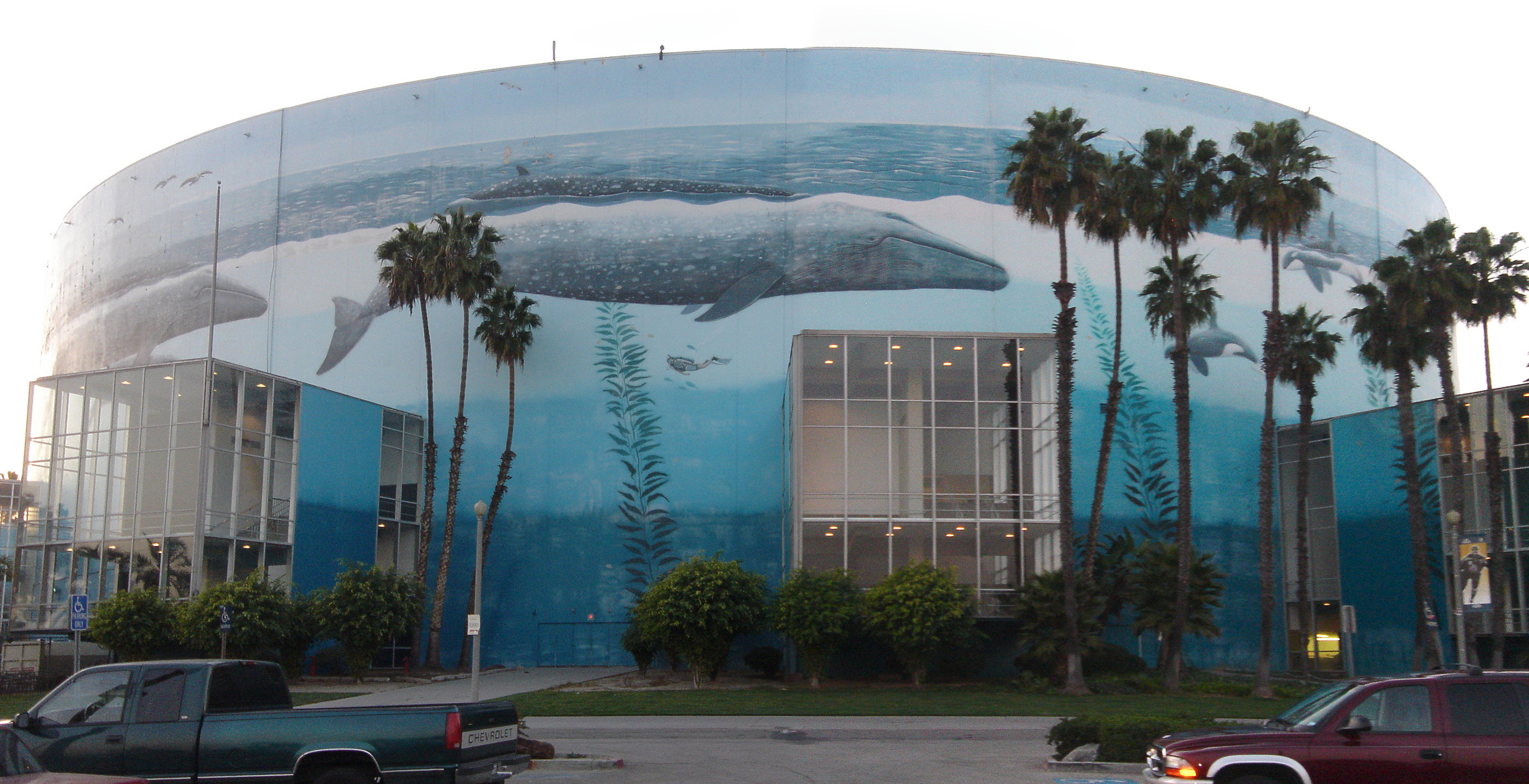
Planet Ocean, Long Beach, California USA

WW index	Name	Location	Dedicated	Comments (Note: "EXTINCT" indicates that the mural is no longer accessible. It may have been covered, destroyed, or significantly altered.)
01	Gray Whale and Calf	509 Pacific Coast Hwy, Laguna Beach, California, USA	1981-07-09	2025: Canvas damaged in Santa Ana wind event; repainted on wall 2019: Mural recreated with painted ceramic tile and canvas 1996: Building owner painted over mural
02	Young Gray Whale	San Clemente, California, USA	1982-03-20	2010: Salvaged mural relocated to Concordia Elementary School, San Clemente 2005: Original location (Orange County Marine Institute) was demolished; mural was removed and framed in pieces
03	Spyhopping	Marineland of the Pacific, Rancho Palos Verdes, California, USA	1984-06-27	EXTINCT (2006): Building demolished; it had been closed since 1987
04	The Gray Whale Family	White Rock, British Columbia, Canada	1984-09-26	2014: Cleaned and damaged areas touched up by local artist Elizabeth Hollick 2007: Restored by Wyland
05	The Orcas of Puget Sound	Edgewater Hotel, 2411 Alaskan Way, Seattle, Washington, USA	1985-11-10	2019: Wyland repainted mural at same location 1995: Building owner painted over mural
06	Hawaiian Humpbacks	Pacifica Airport Center, 3049 Ualena Street, Honolulu, Hawaii, USA	1985-04-21	2017: After legal dispute about needed building repairs and mural ownership, Wyland repainted mural with changes to the original design
07	California Gray Whales	Del Mar Fairgrounds, Del Mar, California, USA	1985-07-06	EXTINCT (2006): Fairground building was replaced with a new building and Wyland painted a new mural for it (Whaling Wall #94).
08	Orcas	1170 Melville Street, Vancouver, British Columbia, Canada	1985-09-10	EXTINCT (1997): Condo was built adjacent to the mural, hiding the mural from street view
09	First Voyage	Polynesian Cultural Center, Oahu, Hawaii, USA	1986-02-04	EXTINCT (1996): Building was moved during renovations, and the mural could not be preserved
10	Manatees	Terminal A, Orlando International Airport, Orlando, Florida, USA	1986	Oil on canvas painting of manatees, located prior to security gates
11	First Born	Renaissance Orlando Resort, 6677 Sea Harbor Drive, Orlando, Florida, USA	1986-09-26	1989 or earlier: Moved from original location at SeaWorld to Stouffer Orlando Resort (now Renaissance)
12	Laguna Coast	2171 Laguna Canyon Road, Laguna Beach, California, USA	1987-02-02	2021: Dispute with building owner about removing the tiles 1996: Recreated in painted tiles to be moveable (it was on a building Wyland rented for a gallery)
13	A-5 Pod	1250 Wharf Street, Victoria, British Columbia, Canada	1987-06-20	2024: Decaying and faded; Wyland proposed restoring it and the building owners hope to preserve it
14	Sperm Whales	Funabashi, Chiba Prefecture, Japan	1987-10-14	
15	Dolphins of Makapuu Point	Sea Life Park Hawaii, Oahu, Hawaii, USA	1988	
16	Orcas off Point Loma	Belmont Park plunge pool, San Diego, California, USA	1989-06-29	EXTINCT (2017): Removed during renovation
17	Bottlenose Dolphins	Painted at Shinjuku Station in Tokyo during a live broadcast of the 24 Hour Television: Love Saves The Earth telethon	1989-08-27	Stored in Osaka, Japan
18	Sperm Whales of the Mediterranean (La fresque des Cachalots)	186 Av. Robert Surcouf St-Laurent-du-Var, Provence-Alpes-Côte d'Azur, France	1989-10	2015: Building masonry renovated and mural restored
19	Forbidden Reef	San Diego, California, USA	1990-07-09	EXTINCT
20	Gray Whale Migration	San Diego, California, USA	1990-07-09	EXTINCT
21	Washington Orcas	928 A Street, Tacoma, Washington, USA	1990-07	
22	Orca Heaven	Yamagata, Yamagata Prefecture, Japan	1990	A ceiling mural
23	Bundaberg Humpback Family	142 Bourbong St, Bundaberg, Queensland, Australia	1990-09-28	
24	Humpback and Calf	Sydney Aquarium, Sydney, New South Wales, Australia	1990-09-28	
25	Humpbacks	Lamphere High School, Madison Heights, Michigan, USA	1990-10-08	
26	Sperm Whales & Florida Keys Reef	5561 Overseas Hwy, Marathon, Florida, USA	1990-10-30	EXTINCT (2001): Wyland painted a new mural (Whaling Wall 87, Florida's Radiant Reef) over this one.
27	Minke Whales	Crane Point Museum and Nature Center, 5550 Overseas Hwy, Marathon, Florida, USA	1990-10-30	
28	A Time for Conservation	Clock tower at Kauai Village Shopping Center, 4-831 Kuhio Highway, Kapaʻa, Hawaii, USA	1991-01-08	2017: Wyland repainted mural after tower was repaired.
29	Humpbacks off the Pali Coast	Kauai Village Shopping Center facing Kuhio Highway, 4-831 Kuhio Highway, Kapaʻa, Hawaii, USA	1991-01-08	2017: Wyland repainted after mural was removed during renovations, but with whales swimming in the opposite direction
30	Maui Humpback Breaching	Lahaina, Hawaii, USA	1991-01-21	EXTINCT (1992): City council requested he remove the mural; it was painted on wood planks, which are now stored in a warehouse
31	Gray Whale Migration	1100 N. Harbor Dr., Redondo Beach, California, USA	1991-06-24	2026: Property was sold to a developer, and the property's future use, including the mural's future, is being contested 2011: Wyland restored the mural
32	Whales	Taiji Whale Museum, Taiji, Wakayama Prefecture, Japan	1991-08	EXTINCT (2013 or earlier): Mural was painted over
33	Planet Ocean	Long Beach Arena, Long Beach, California, USA	1992-07-09	2009: Wyland restored the wall mural, and added a new mural to the roof of the arena (Earth: The Blue Planet) Was the largest mural in the world when first painted
34	Ocean Biosphere	Biosphere 2, Oracle, Arizona, USA	1993-04-18	EXTINCT
35	Orcas of the Oregon Coast	Fox Theatre, SW Park at SW Taylor, Portland, Oregon, USA	1993-05-09	EXTINCT (1997): Entire block of buildings was demolished to make way for Fox Tower
36	Whales off the Coast of Maine	Maine State Pier, Portland, Maine, USA	1993-06-07	
37	Isle of Shoals Humpbacks	64 Vaughan Mall at Hanover St., Portsmouth, New Hampshire, USA	1993-06-14	EXTINCT (2021): The wall's brick behind the mural was degrading; the building was demolished and the mural could not be saved 2007: Volunteer group that restored Whaling Wall #41 in New London, Connecticut, offered to help restore this mural, but Portsmouth residents did not express interest
38	Stellwagen Bank	33 Traveler Street, Boston, Massachusetts, USA	1993-06-21	EXTINCT (1999): Building's decaying brick facade was covered with aluminum siding and a new whale scene was painted by Ron Deziel
39	Finback Whales	145 Crary St., Providence, Rhode Island, USA	1993-06-28	EXTINCT (2000): Building was demolished during the relocation of Interstate 95
40	Inner City Whales	Port Authority Bus Terminal, 41st Street Underpass, New York City, New York, USA	1993-07-05	
41	The Great Sperm Whales	Eugene O'Neill Dr. & State Street, New London, Connecticut, USA	1993-07-12	2023: Repainted by Wyland, with a new giant red squid 2006–2013: Mural was retouched by hand every year, by local artists David Bishop and Norm Johnson 2006: Repainted by local artists
42	East Coast Humpbacks	2400 Market Street, Philadelphia, Pennsylvania, USA	1993-07-19	EXTINCT (2017): Torn down as part of renovations to Aramark global headquarters building
43	Humpbacks off the Jersey Coast	3800 Boardwalk Mall, Wildwood, New Jersey, USA	1993-07-26	EXTINCT (2018): Wall repairs and power-washing removed much of the mural and it could not be saved
44	Delaware Marine Mammals	117 N. Market St., Wilmington, Delaware, USA	1993-08-02	
45	Dolphins-Small Tooth Whales	Entrance to the Visitors Center, Smithsonian National Zoo, 3001 Connecticut Ave. N.W., Washington, D.C., USA	1993-08-09	EXTINCT (2023): Wyland painted a new mural over this one, focusing on corals and fishes of Lanai.
46	Extinct Atlantic Gray Whales	600 W. Hamburg St., Baltimore, Maryland, USA	1993-08-16	2014: Restored by local artists Shawn James and Charles Lawrance of Mural Masters, Inc.
47	Humpbacks off the Virginia Coast	999 Waterside Drive, Norfolk, Virginia, USA	1993-08-23	
48	Coastal Dolphins	Coastline Inn, 503 Nutt St., Wilmington, North Carolina, USA	1993-08-30	
49	Right Whales off the South Carolina Coast	Myrtle Beach Convention Center, 2101 North Oak Street, Myrtle Beach, South Carolina, USA	1993-09-06	2018: Restored by local artist Tommy Simpson
50	Atlanta's Right Whales	90 Central Avenue, Atlanta, Georgia, USA	1993-09-16	EXTINCT (2010): Removed to make needed concrete repairs to the building
51	Florida's Dolphins	Mote Marine Laboratory Aquarium, 1600 Ken Thompson Parkway, Sarasota, Florida, USA	1993-09-20	EXTINCT (2025): Aquarium closed to the public
52	Florida's Living Reef	201 William Street, Key West, Florida, USA	1993-09-27	2022: Wyland repainted the mural
53	Orcas off the Gulf of Mexico	South Padre Island Convention Centre, 7355 Padre Boulevard, South Padre Island, Texas, USA	1994-03-14	2002: Repainted several times, starting in 2002, by Harlingen, Texas, artist Angel Hernandez who has done many new murals in the Rio Grande Valley area as well as repainting historic ones; work was done with Wyland's approval and no changes to the original design
54	Alaska's Marine Life	406 W. 5th Ave., Anchorage, Alaska, USA	1994-08-08	
55	Orcas A-30 Subpod	Vancouver Aquarium in Stanley Park, Vancouver, British Columbia, Canada	1994-08-15	EXTINCT (2017): Painted over
56	Vancouver Island Orcas	1390 Granville, Vancouver, British Columbia, Canada	1994-08-15	EXTINCT (2015): Building demolished 2010: Restored for the Vancouver Olympics
57	Leap of Faith	2224 Eighth Ave., Seattle, Washington, USA	1994-08-22	EXTINCT (2011): Mural was painted over, hotel was renovated for a 2012 rebranding Whaling Wall #57 and #58 were painted on the same building on the same day.
58	Orcas off the San Juan Islands	2224 Eighth Ave., Seattle, Washington, USA	1994-08-22	EXTINCT (2011): Mural was painted over, hotel was renovated for a 2012 rebranding Whaling Wall #57 and #58 were painted on the same building on the same day.
59	Gray Whales off Oregon Coast	617 SW Bay Blvd., Newport, Oregon, USA	1994-08-29	
60	Spyhopping Gray Whale	Pier 39 Public Parking garage, 172 Beach St. at The Embarcadero, San Francisco, California, USA	1994-09-05	
61	Grays off the San Francisco Coast	Pier 39, next to Aquarium of the Bay, The Embarcadero at Beach St., San Francisco, California, USA	1994-09-05	
62	Celebrating Gray Whales	Hollywood, California, USA	1994-09-12	EXTINCT (1999): Mural was painted on Mann's Chinese Twin, a theater adjacent to Grauman's Chinese Theater for 70mm presentations; the Twin was demolished to build the current-day Ovation Hollywood
63	Life Size Blue Whales	Stage 29, Paramount Pictures, N. Gower St. at Leonard Nimoy Way, Hollywood, California, USA	1994-09-12	The mural remains and is visible from the street
64	San Diego Migration	1420 Kettner Blvd., San Diego, California, USA	1994-09-19	EXTINCT (2012, partial): Ariel Apartments built abutting the building with mural, blocking view for anyone except their tenants 2010: US Bank committed to keeping it when they bought the building
65	Friendly Grays of San Ignacio	Mexico City, Mexico, USA	1994-09-26	EXTINCT
66	Free Keiko	Mexico City, Mexico, USA	1994-09-26	EXTINCT Mural was painted as part of an agreement to free Keiko (Free Willy)
67	Earth Day Hawaii	Honolulu, Hawaii, USA	1995-04-22	
68	Pacific Realm	Laguna Beach, California, USA	1996-11-06	Ceiling
69	The Blues Whales	New Orleans, Louisiana, USA	1997-05-03	
70	Heavenly Waters	Redpath Sugar Refinery, Toronto, Ontario, Canada	1997-09-01	The mural is located on the north wall of the sugar shed. It is viewable from Queens Quay.
71	Our Ocean Family	Apple Valley, Minnesota, USA	1997-09-08	
72	Whale Commuters	Milwaukee County Courthouse Annex, over northbound lanes of I-43, Milwaukee, Wisconsin, USA	1997-09-15	EXTINCT (2006): Demolished during removal of Courthouse Annex and Marquette Interchange reconstruction; small portions of mural with adult and baby dolphin and "Wyland" signature installed at northern portal of the Kilbourn Tunnel at I-43 Northbound in February 2007
73	The Windy Whales	Chicago, Illinois, USA	1997-09-22	New construction has covered all but a sliver of wall. Signature still visible but not much else.
74	Orcas Passage	Indianapolis, Indiana, USA	1997-09-29	
75	Song of the Whales	Cleveland, Ohio, USA	1997-10-06	Restoration completed and wall rededicated October 4, 2019
76	Whale Tower	Broderick Tower, Detroit, Michigan, USA	1997-10-13	Still intact. Was covered by lighted advertising during the 2006 World Series and infrequently afterward, but was eventually re-exposed to public view. The mural will not be maintained by the newly renovated Broderick Tower apartments and will fade naturally.
77	Eye of the Whale	Royal Ontario Museum, 100 Queen's Park, Toronto, Ontario, Canada	1997-10-21	EXTINCT
78	Florida's Marine Life	Macy's Department Store, 22 East Flagler St., Miami, Florida, USA	1998-05-04	On SE 1st Street side of building
79	Santa Monica's Marine Life	Santa Monica, California, USA	1998-08-25	EXTINCT as of Jan-2012
80	World of Ocean Life	2275 S 300 W, Salt Lake City, Utah 84115, USA	1998-09-07	
81	Atlantic Humpback Whales	Aquarium of Niagara, Niagara Falls, New York, USA	1998-09-29	
82	Ocean Life	505 N. Akard Street, Dallas, Texas, USA	1999-04-16	EXTINCT (2026, partial): Largest side of mural (which spanned two adjacent sides of the building) was painted over for a 2026 FIFA World Cup advertisement; Wyland issued a cease-and-desist letter About 2015–2020: Mural completely covered by a vinyl wrap for outdoor advertising
83	Race to Save the Ocean	San Diego, California, USA	1999-06-12	Two sides of the racing hull painted on the yacht Abracadabra competed in the 2000 America's Cup Race in Hawaii. Abracadabra currently at Maritime Museum of San Diego.
84	New Zealand Marine Life	New Zealand National Maritime Museum, Auckland, New Zealand	1999-10-15	EXTINCT (2010)
85	New Millennium	Pacifica Airport Center, 3049 Ualena Street, Honolulu, Hawaii, USA	1999-12-15	2017: After legal dispute about needed building repairs and mural ownership, Wyland repainted mural with changes to the original design
86	Manatee Sanctuary	4150 South Suncoast Blvd, Homosassa Springs, Florida, USA	2000-10-23	Homosassa Springs Wildlife Park Visitor Center building
87	Florida's Radiant Reef	5561 Overseas Hwy, Marathon, Florida, USA	2001-03-09	2023: After significant community input, building owner commits to keeping the mural 2022: Restored by Wyland Wyland painted this mural on top of Whaling Wall 26, Sperm Whales & Florida Keys Reef.
88	Marine Life of the Gulf	690 Regatta Bay Drive, Destin, Florida, USA	2001-10-17	Touched up in 2015
89	Humpback Realm	NAVY Exchange, 4725 Bougainville Drive, Pearl Harbor, Hawaii, USA	2002-12	
90	Palau's Blue Corner	International Airport, Yelch, Airai State, Palau	2003-02	Companion mural at the Etpison Museum
91	Guam's Ocean Life	Guam International Airport, Hagatna, Guam	2004-02-19	
92	Baja Tranquility	La Paz, Baja California Sur, Mexico	2005-08-08	
93	Great Whales of New Bedford	West Terminal, Maritime Terminal Inc., MacArthur Drive, New Bedford, Massachusetts, USA	2005-10-20	
94	Ride the Tide	Del Mar Fairgrounds, Del Mar, California, USA	2006-06-24	Painted to replace Whaling Wall #07
95	Keys to the Seas	Scuba-Fun, 99222 Overseas Highway, Key Largo, Florida, USA	2007-02-12	
96	Riches of the Ocean	Pago Pago, Tutuila, American Samoa	2008-04-12	
97	Sea of Life	Plymouth, Devon, England	2008-05-10	National Marine Aquarium
98	Celebrating the Reef	Santos, São Paulo, Brazil	2008-05-17	Santos Municipal Aquarium
99	Water for Life	North Lauderdale, Florida, USA	2008-06-14	McNab Road
100	Hands Across the Oceans	Beijing, China	2008-06-14	2008 Beijing (Green) Olympics; Panels presented in Washington DC, September 30, 2008; in storage
