= Robert Wyland =

American muralist (born 1956)

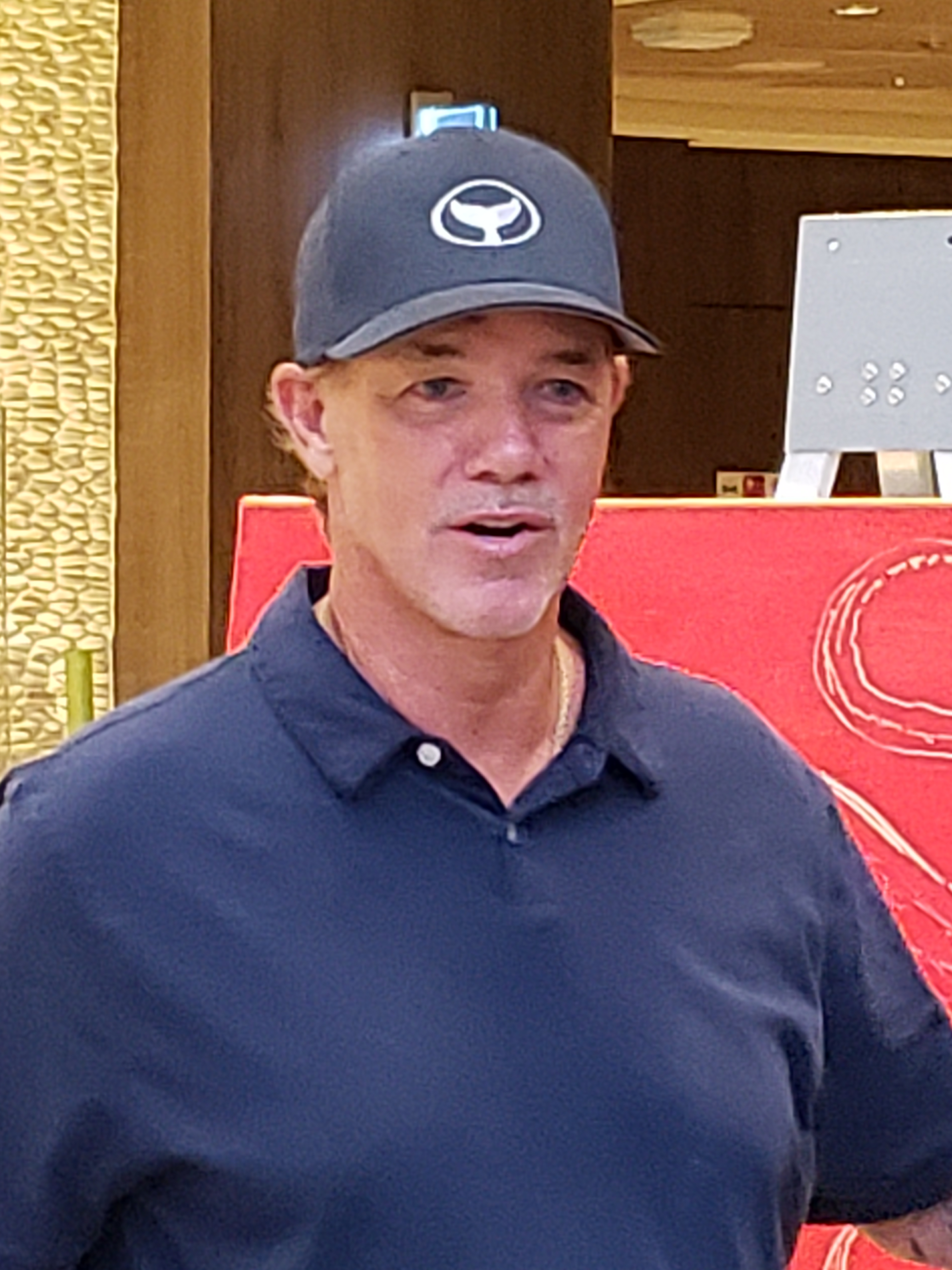
Wyland in 2019

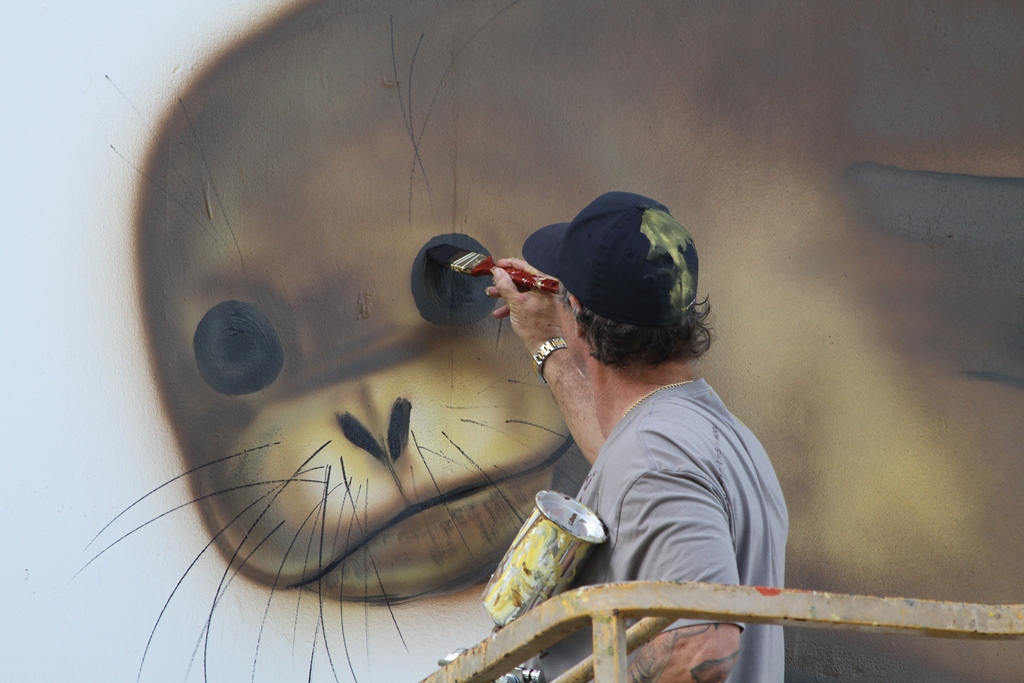
Wyland painting a mural on a former military barracks now part of the Midway Atoll National Wildlife Refuge

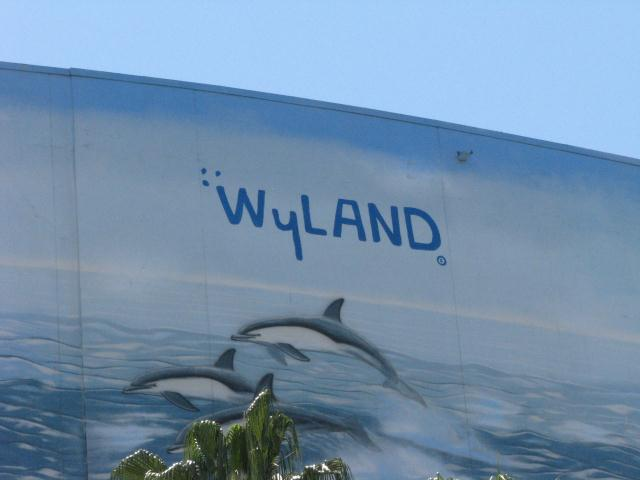
Wyland's signature on a mural at the Long Beach Arena

Robert Wyland (born July 9, 1956), known simply as Wyland, is an American artist and conservationist best known for his more than 100 Whaling Walls, large outdoor murals featuring images of life-size whales and other sea life to call attention to the plight of whales throughout the world.

== Life and career ==
A native of Madison Heights, Michigan, Wyland began painting as a child and attended Detroit's Center for Creative Studies in the 1970s. His connection with whales began when he was 14 on a visit with his family to Laguna Beach, California where he saw the ocean for the first time and witnessed several gray whales migrating down the California coast towards Mexico. In 1977 he moved to Laguna Beach and in 1981 painted his first The Whaling Wall mural on the large wall of a Laguna Beach hotel parking lot. This original 1981 mural was obliterated in 1996 when it was painted over in a property ownership dispute. Wyland re-created the mural at nearly the same location with painted ceramic tile in 1996, followed by a wall-mounted canvas addition in 2019 when he included the additional title Gray Whale and Calf.

In 1993, he founded the non-profit Wyland Foundation, "to help children rediscover the wonder of the ocean through art" (according to Steve Creech, the foundation's president) and to finance his Whaling Wall murals. Wyland's largest ocean mural sets an international record of over three acres in area, on the exterior of the Long Beach Convention Center. Wyland's 100th Whaling Wall was painted in Beijing in 2008. His foundation has since expanded its work to include other environmental initiatives such as sponsorship of the National Mayor's Challenge for Water Conservation.

By 1997, his commercial work (sold through Wyland Galleries LLC) and licensed merchandise sold at zoos and other outlets had become a multimillion-dollar business supporting both his galleries and his non-profit endeavors for the conservation of coasts and waterways. His artwork has been featured on California and Florida specialty license plates as well as on a series of four United Nations stamps issued in 2010 to commemorate the 50th Anniversary of the Intergovernmental Oceanographic Commission.

In 2018, Norwegian Cruise Line launched their newest cruise ship, Norwegian Bliss. Wyland designed and painted a massive mural on the hull of the over 1,000-foot-long ship, featuring his trademark images of life-sized whales.

In mid-May 2026, a mural that Wyland had painted in Dallas, Texas, which was dubbed "Ocean Life", was painted over by FIFA's North Texas FIFA World Cup Organizing Committee so that it could be replaced with a mural promoting the 2026 FIFA World Cup. In response, Wyland and his team filed a lawsuit against FIFA seeking $25 million in damages–which he would donate to charity–saying that FIFA had violated the Visual Artists Rights Act. The city of Dallas said that Wyland had been notified of the painting over of the mural, but Wyland denied that. The organizing committee said that there had been shortcomings in communication regarding the mural, but that FIFA was not to blame. The Dallas Morning News obtained emails from Downtown Dallas Inc (DDI), the local development agency, in which a DDI employee wrote that the building where Wyland's mural was located was ideal for a FIFA World Cup mural. The owner of the building said that DDI and the organizing committee had asked them to donate the space where Wyland's mural was located for a FIFA World Cup mural, and that they had agreed to it in order to appear as a good local partner.

Wyland lives in the Florida Keys, California, and Hawaii.

== Conservation and outreach ==
After spending the first half of his career focused on drawing attention to marine mammal conservation, Wyland, along with co-author and frequent environmental collaborator Steve Creech expanded the focus of the Wyland Foundation to raise awareness about issues affecting U.S. waterways, including urban runoff, nutrient pollution, and marine debris issues. Among their work was the creation of a 1,000 square foot traveling clean water science center, featuring a 40-person onboard interactive movie theater, computer model simulations of region's affected by water pollution, and onboard running rivers. "You can't protect one area of water without thinking about how we protect all of it, because it's all connected," Wyland said. "If you want to think about protecting our ocean, you have to think about what we're doing to our freshwater habitats. The lakes, the rivers, the streams, the ponds, the wetlands. It's all connected."

== Legacy ==
Wyland's pioneering efforts to create monumental artworks dedicated to marine life conservation pre-dated today's world of super graphics. At the height of his popularity, it was estimated that Wyland's artworks in cities around the world were seen by up to 1 billion people a year.

== See also ==
- List of Whaling Walls
