= Grand Circus Park station =

Transportation hub and transfer station in Detroit, Michigan

Grand Circus Park
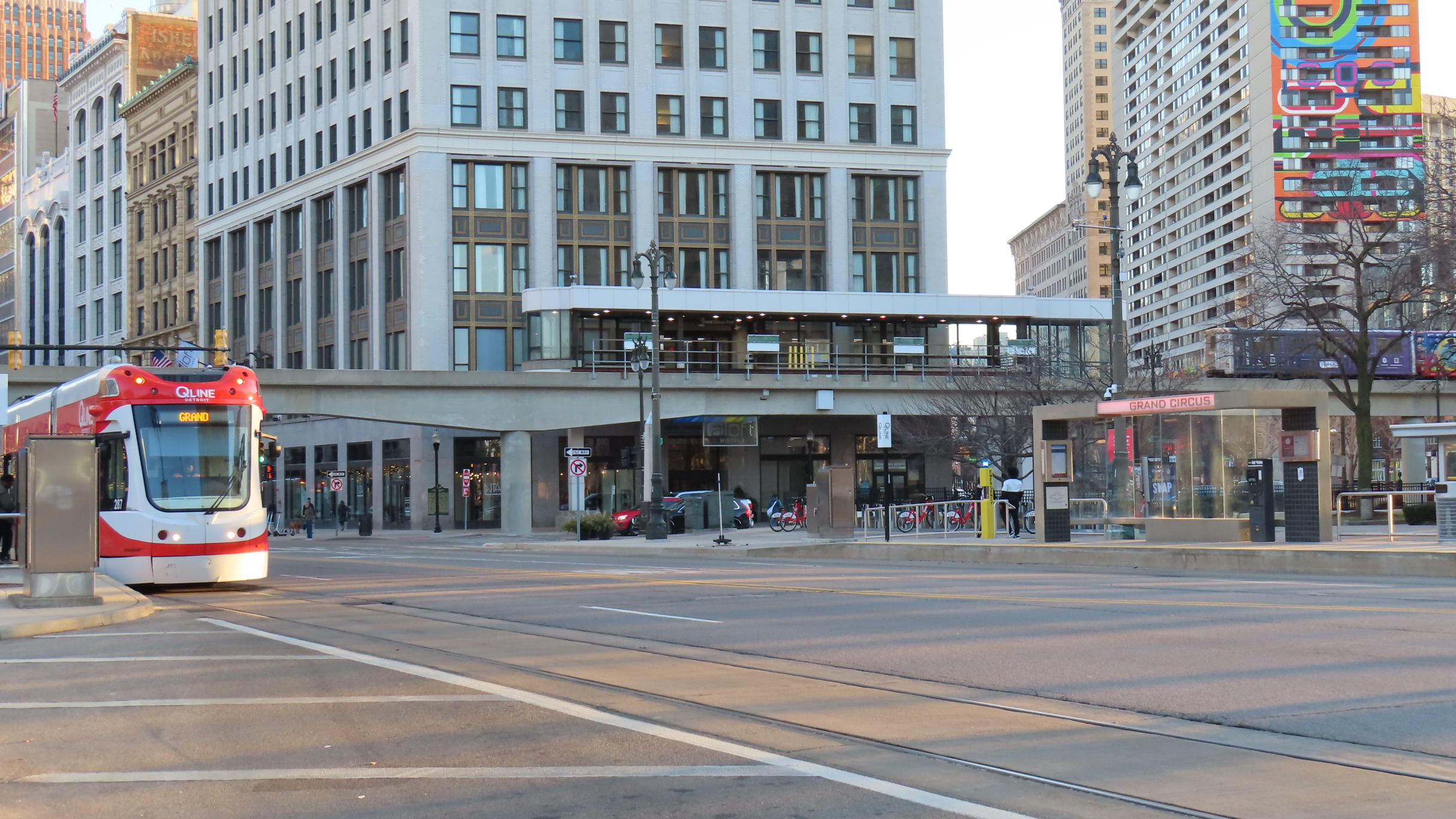
- Grand Circus Park station, with elevated People Mover platform in background, and a QLine train in the foreground.

General information
- Location: 1 Park Avenue; Detroit, Michigan 48226; United States
- Coordinates: 42°20′09″N 83°03′02″W
- Owner: Detroit Transportation Corporation (People Mover); M-1 Rail (QLINE)
- Platforms: 3 side platforms
- Tracks: 1 (People Mover); 2 (QLINE)
- Connections: DDOT 4 SMART FAST Michigan & Woodward; D2A2

History
- Opened: September 20, 1976 (Detroit Citizens' Railway); July 31, 1987 (DPM); May 12, 2017 (QLINE)
- Closed: June 2003 (Detroit Downtown Trolley)
- Rebuilt: 2015 (DPM)

Services
Preceding station	Detroit People Mover	Following station
Broadway One-way operation	Detroit People Mover	Times Square Next counter-clockwise
Preceding station	QLine	Following station
Montcalm Street toward Grand Boulevard	QLine transfer at Grand Circus	Campus Martius toward Congress Street
Former services (pre-2003)
Preceding station	Detroit Downtown Trolley	Following station
Terminus	Detroit Downtown Trolley	Washington Blvd. trolley stops toward Renaissance Center
Location

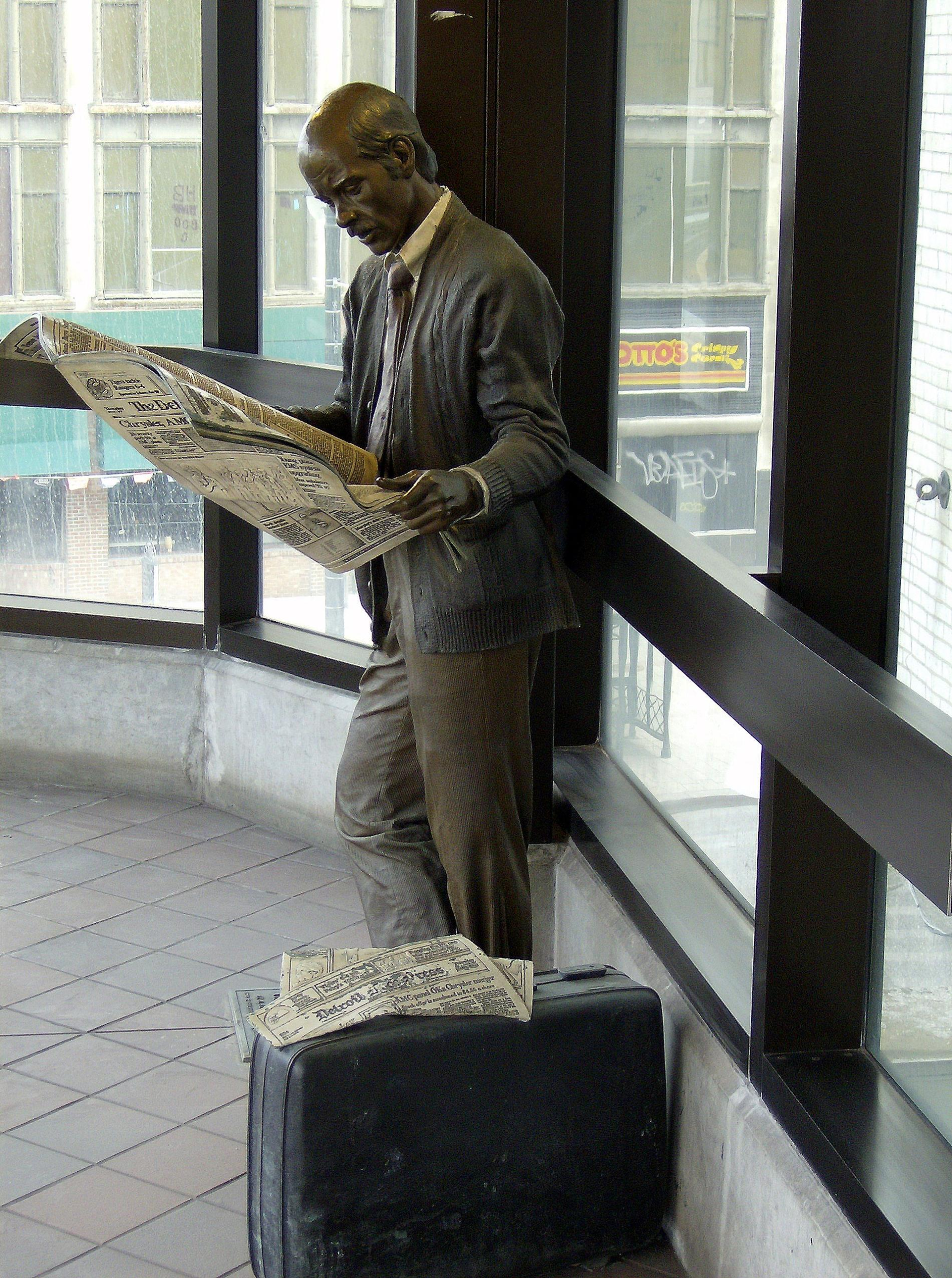
Catching Up

Grand Circus Park station is a public transit station in downtown Detroit, Michigan, served by the Detroit People Mover and the QLine. The station takes its name from the adjacent Grand Circus Park. It is also the terminus of the D2A2 commuter bus to Ann Arbor, and serves as a transfer point to SMART's FAST Michigan and Woodward express bus lines.

A station has existed since September 20, 1976 with the opening of the Detroit Citizens' Railway, later the Detroit Downtown Trolley, a heritage streetcar line operating until 2003. The People Mover station opened July 31, 1987. Streetcar service returned with the opening of the QLine on May 12, 2017.

== Detroit People Mover ==
The People Mover station occupies the first two floors of a structure attached to the historic David Whitney Building. It is located at the intersection of Park Street and Woodward Avenue near Washington Boulevard, in the Grand Circus Park Historic District. Grand Circus Park is the nearest People Mover station to Comerica Park, (Note: The Broadway and Grand Circus Park stations are roughly equidistant from Comerica Park, and are interchangeably referred to as the nearest station to the stadium in People Mover signage and communications.) the Fox Theatre, The Fillmore Detroit, Little Caesars headquarters, Little Caesars Arena, and the Hockeytown Cafe.

The station was reachable only by an external stairway from 1999 to 2015, when the David Whitney Building was closed. A new station lobby was constructed from August 2014 to June 2015 alongside the building's restoration, with a new elevator added to restore accessibility.

=== Public art ===
On the platform stands Catching Up, a bronze sculpture by John Seward Johnson II, depicting a man reading a newspaper while waiting for a train. The newspaper depicted is the actual May 21, 1987 issue of The Detroit News, with a headline breaking the news of that year's merger of Chrysler and American Motors, and advertisements for defunct Detroit-area retail chains Crowley's and Farmer Jack. The News is said to have been chosen over the competing Detroit Free Press by a coin toss; the Free Press is instead featured folded atop the man's briefcase.

== QLine ==
The QLine serves two street-level side platforms on Woodward Avenue north of Park Avenue and Witherell Street. The QLine portion of the station is sponsored by General Motors' Chevrolet brand.

== Heritage trolley ==
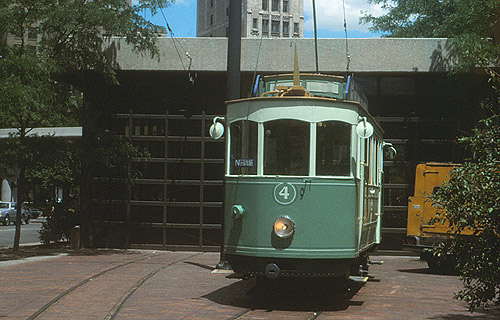
Detroit Downtown Trolley stopped at Grand Circus Park in front of the line's carhouse, 1988

The station was the northern terminus of the Detroit Downtown Trolley, having a double-track boarding area just south of the carhouse near Park Avenue. The east half of Washington Boulevard was converted into a pedestrian mall, and later the Detroit People Mover included an exit-only staircase near the trolley stop.

In June 2003 the Detroit Downtown Trolley abruptly ended service. In February 2004 the carhouse was demolished, with mall sculptures removed that year, the pedestrian mall was fully displaced by vehicle traffic in 2005.

== See also ==
- List of rapid transit systems
- List of United States rapid transit systems by ridership
- Metromover
- Streetcars in North America
- Transportation in metropolitan Detroit
