= Comerica Park =

Baseball stadium in Detroit, Michigan

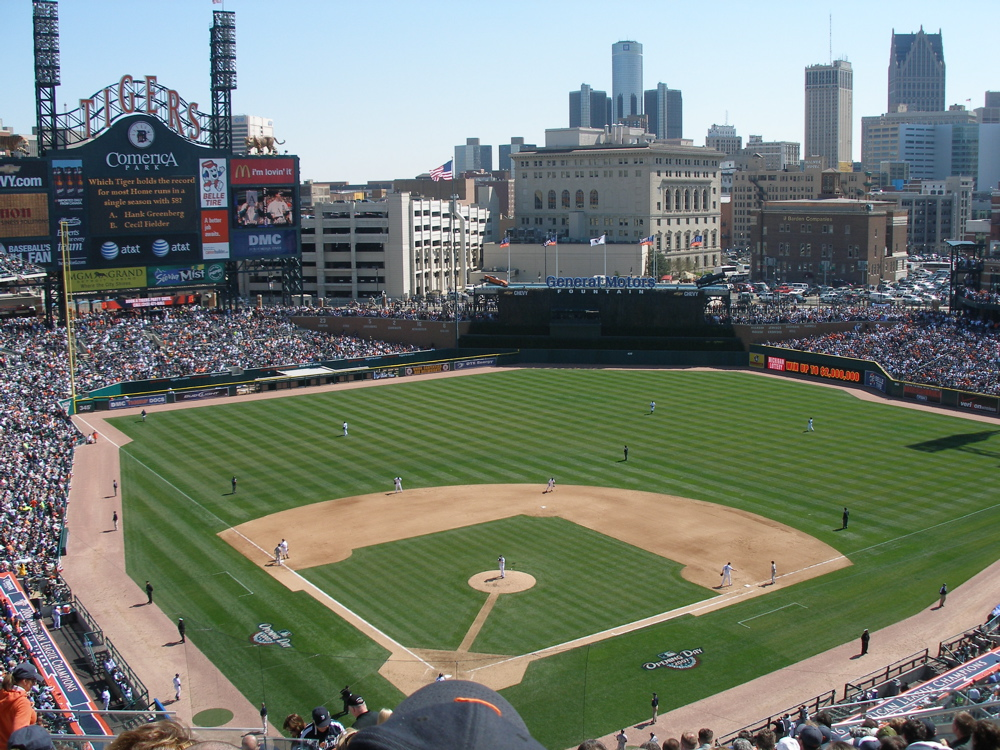
- Comerica Park in April 2007

- Location in Wayne County, Michigan Location in Michigan Location in the United States
- Address: 2100 Woodward Avenue
- Location: Detroit, Michigan, U.S.
- Coordinates: 42°20′21″N 83°2′55″W
- Owner: Detroit-Wayne County Stadium Authority
- Operator: 313 Presents
- Capacity: 40,120 (2000–2002); 41,070 (2003–2007); 41,000 (2008); 41,255 (2009–2013); 41,681 (2014); 41,574 (2015); 41,297 (2016); 41,299 (2017); 41,083 (since 2018)
- Surface: Kentucky Bluegrass
- Record attendance: Baseball: 45,280 (July 26, 2008 against Chicago White Sox); Concert: 45,000 (August 16, 2023) Pink's Summer Carnival
- Field size: Left field – 342 ft (104 m); Left-center – 370 ft (110 m); Center field – 412 ft (126 m); Right-center – 365 ft (111 m); Right field – 330 ft (100 m)
- Public transit: Broadway; Grand Circus Park; Montcalm Street SMART FAST Michigan 261, Woodward 461, 462 DDOT 4

Construction
- Groundbreaking: October 29, 1997; 29 years ago
- Opened: April 11, 2000; 26 years ago
- Cost: $300 million; ($561 million in 2025 dollars)
- Architects: Populous (then HOK Sport); SHG, Inc.; Rockwell Group
- Project managers: International Facilities Group, LLC.
- Structural engineers: Bliss & Nyitray, Inc.
- Services engineer: M-E Engineers Inc.
- General contractor: Hunt-Turner-White

Tenant
- Detroit Tigers (MLB) (2000–present)

Website
- mlb.com/tigers/ballpark

Comerica Park is an open-air baseball stadium in Detroit, Michigan, United States. It has been the home of the Detroit Tigers of Major League Baseball (MLB) since its opening in 2000. It was built in the retro-classic style, and has a seating capacity of 41,083.

The stadium is slated to be renamed Fifth Third Park prior to the start of the 2027 Major League Baseball season due to Comerica Bank being acquired by Fifth Third Bank in February 2026.

== History ==
=== Construction ===
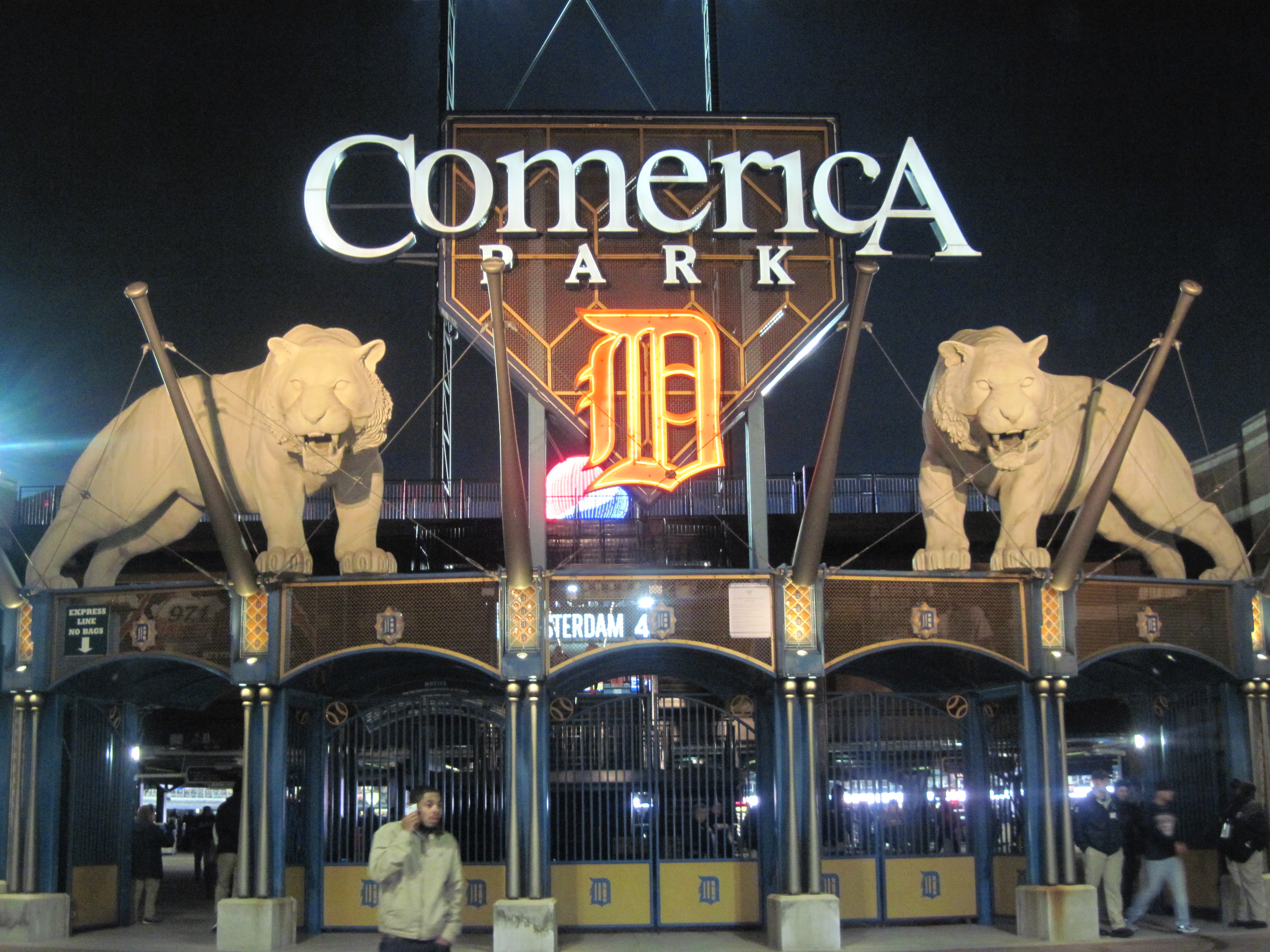
Entrance to the park

Founded in 1894, the Tigers had played at the corner of Michigan and Trumbull Avenues in Detroit's Corktown neighborhood since 1896, when Bennett Park opened. In 1911, new Tigers owner Frank Navin ordered the construction of a new ballpark to be built on the same site. Opening in 1912, the ballpark, which eventually became known as Tiger Stadium, served as the Tigers' home for the next 88 seasons. By the mid-1990s, it had become apparent that the much-beloved ballpark was at the end of its useful life.

Comerica Park sits on the original site of the Detroit College of Law. Groundbreaking for the new stadium was held on October 29, 1997. At the time of construction, the scoreboard in left field was the largest in Major League Baseball. It was part of a downtown revitalization plan for the city of Detroit, which included the construction of Ford Field, adjacent to the ballpark. The first game was held on April 11, 2000, against the Seattle Mariners.

=== First game ===
The first game at Comerica Park was held on Tuesday, April 11, 2000, with 39,168 spectators attending, on a cold snowy afternoon. The temperature that afternoon was 36 °F (2 °C). The Tigers beat the Seattle Mariners 5–2. The winning pitcher, as in the final game at Tiger Stadium, was Brian Moehler.

=== Naming rights ===
In December 1998, Comerica Bank agreed to pay $66 million over 30 years for the naming rights for the new ballpark. In 2018, Comerica extended its naming rights agreement with the Tigers through 2034. In October 2025, Fifth Third Bank announced an agreement to acquire Comerica, which was completed in February 2026. On September 21, 2026, it was announced that the stadium would be renamed Fifth Third Park in 2027.

== Features ==
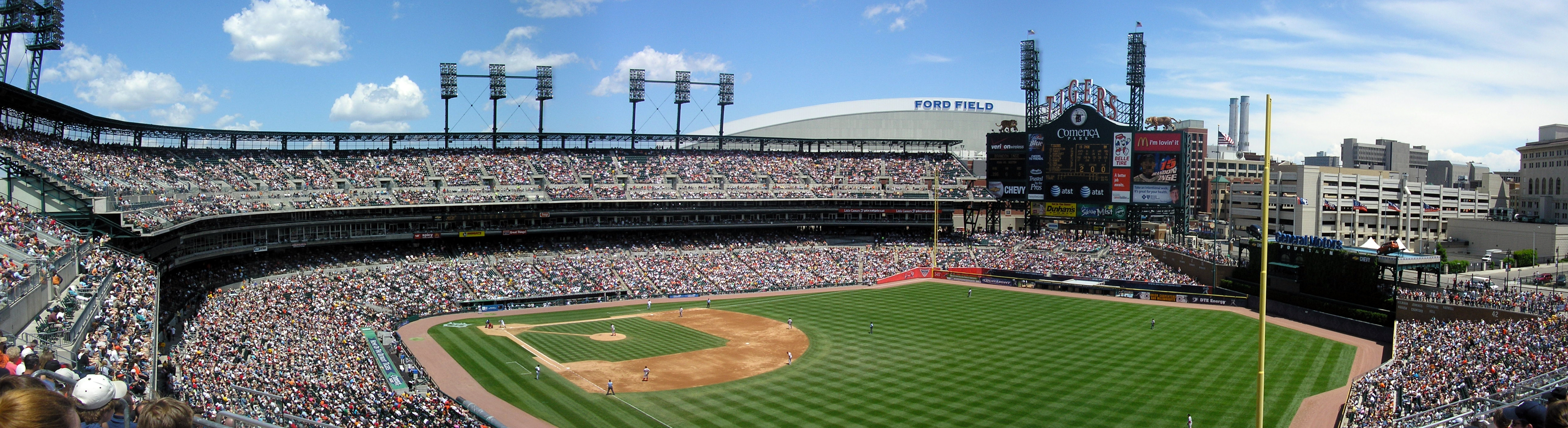
Comerica Park panorama.

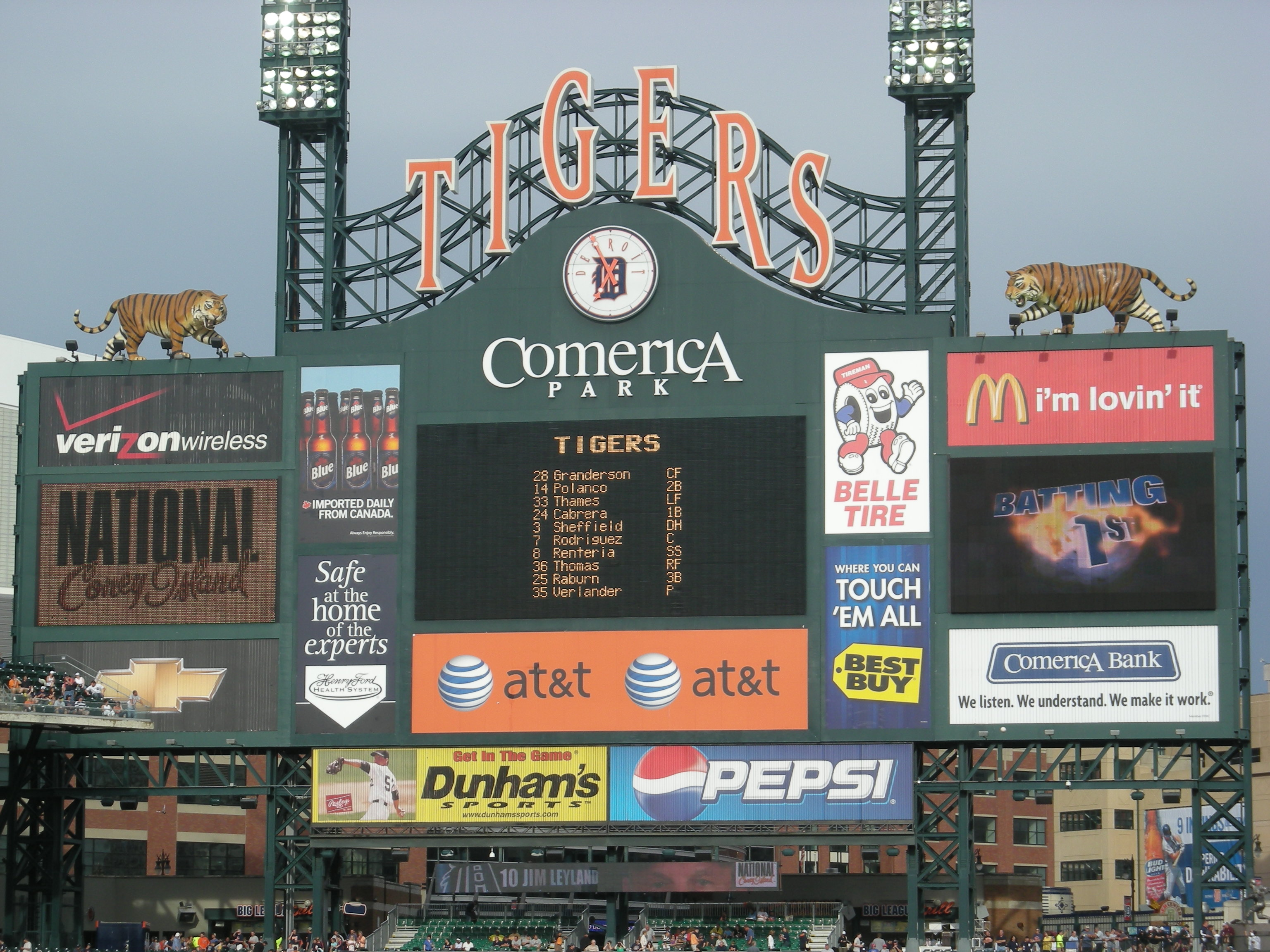
Stadium scoreboard in 2008

The main entrance to the ballpark is located across the street from the Fox Theatre and between two historic downtown churches, St. John Episcopal Church and Central United Methodist Church. Outside the main entrance is a tiger statue that is 15 feet (4.6 m) in height. There are 8 other heroic-sized tiger statues throughout the park, including two prowling on top of the scoreboard in left field. These tigers' eyes light up after a Tigers home run or a victory and the sound of a growling tiger plays as well. The tigers were originally created by sculptor Michael Keropian and fabricated by ShowMotion Inc. in Norwalk, Connecticut. Along the brick walls outside the park are 33 tiger heads with lighted baseballs in their mouths.

At the left-center field concourse there are statues of almost all of the players whose numbers have been retired by the Tigers (with the exception of Jackie Robinson, whose number was retired in every MLB park in 1997 and is located on the wall in right-center field). A statue of Ty Cobb is also there, but he does not have a number, as he played baseball before players began to wear numbers on their uniforms. These players' names, along with the names of Hall of Fame players and broadcasters who spent a significant part of their career with the Tigers, are also on a wall in right-center field. Ernie Harwell, the team's long time radio announcer and a recipient of the Hall of Fame's Ford C. Frick Award, has a statue just inside the stadium on the first base side.

Comerica Park was the last ballpark in MLB to feature a distinctive dirt strip between home plate and the pitcher's mound. This strip, sometimes known as the "keyhole", was common in early ballparks, but it was very rare in modern facilities. It was removed prior to the 2025 season. Additionally, the home plate area is in the shape of the home plate itself, and not as a standard circle.

In the northeastern corner of the stadium behind the stands from the third base line is a Ferris wheel with twelve cars designed like baseballs. In the northwestern corner of the stadium behind the stands from the first base line is a carousel.

The flagpole located between center and left fields was originally in play, as was the flagpole in Tiger Stadium. However, the left field wall was moved in front of the pole before the 2003 season. A ball that hits the pole is now ruled a home run. The right field of the stadium features the Comerica Landing, formerly known as the Pepsi Porch, a picnic deck between the 100 and 200 level seating bowls. Also in right field, and part of the 100 level seating bowl, is an area of seats known as "Kaline's Corner", an homage to Hall of Fame right fielder Al Kaline, who once played for the Tigers when the team played in Tiger Stadium.

An LED scoreboard was added to the right-center field wall, and the upper deck fascia for the 2007 season.

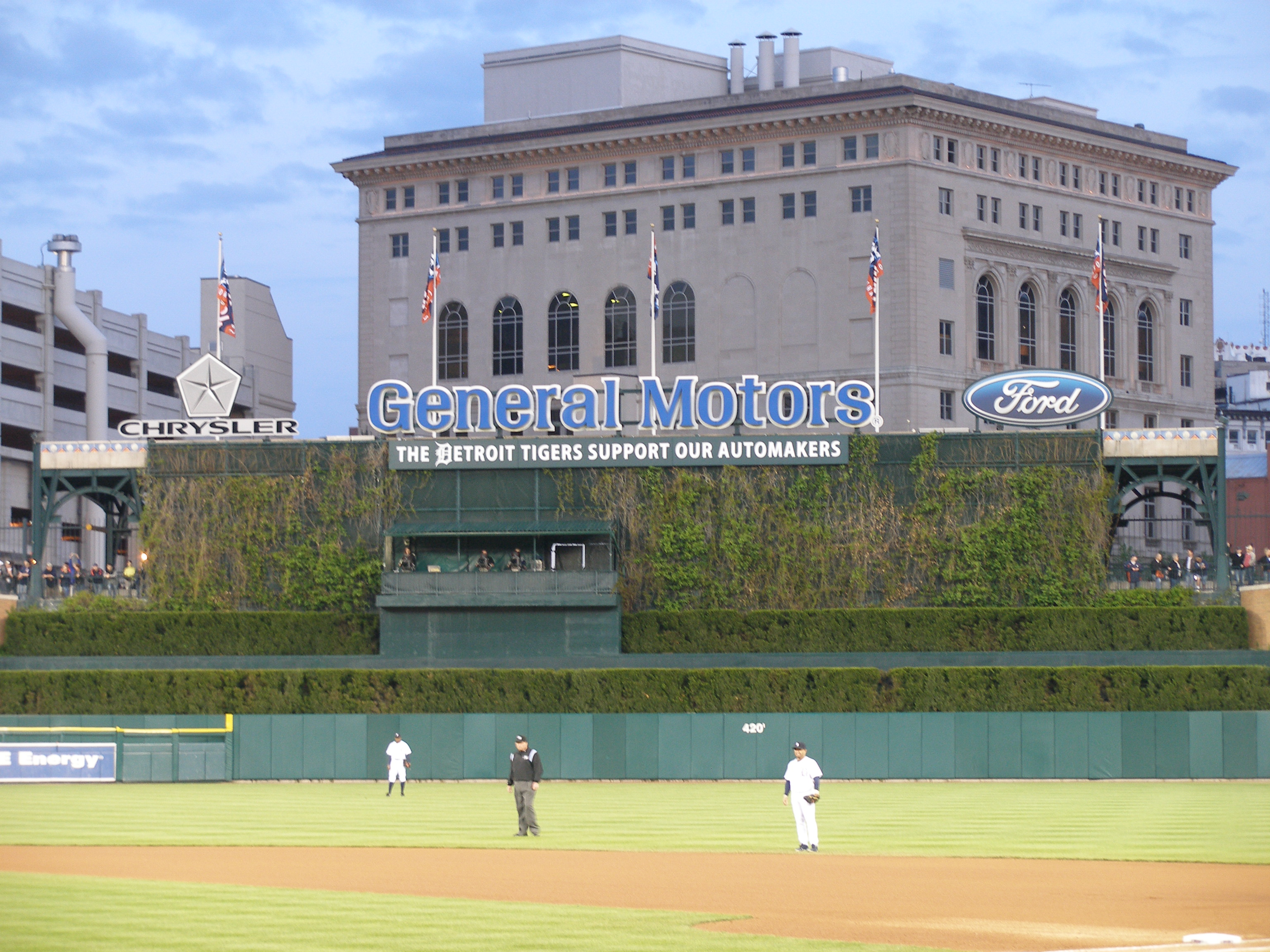
The center field fountain, now known as the Chevrolet Fountain, was originally called the General Motors Fountain. This picture was taken in 2009, when the Tigers added the logos for Chrysler and Ford as a show of support for the struggling automotive industry. Directly behind the fountain is the Detroit Athletic Club.

A giant fountain is located behind center field. General Motors sponsored the fountain from 2000 to 2008, and used the area to showcase GM manufactured vehicles as well. While GM dropped its sponsorship for the 2009 season due to financial issues, the GM branding was not removed from the fountain. Instead, signs for Chrysler and Ford were also added to the display, along with the message "The Detroit Tigers support our automakers." In 2010, GM returned to sponsoring the display, now known as the Chevrolet Fountain.

A completely redesigned and upgraded left field video display debuted for the 2012 season. The serif "TIGERS" wordmark was removed and replaced by cursive lettering that can also display graphics and video. An analog clock below the Tigers wordmark and above the Comerica Park logo was also removed. An HD LED display was installed, which was much larger than the three displays that had been there for years.

The previous scoreboard used light bulbs – still a popular scoreboard technology around the time the park opened, though they were quickly aging as LED displays became available and were installed around other Major League ballparks. The scoreboard was also raised 16 feet (4.9 m) in an effort to address complaints that the scoreboard was too far left and thus obstructed by the left field upper deck. Along with the replacement scoreboard, all remaining bulb fascia scoreboards were also upgraded to LED. A new videoboard was installed for the 2024 season. Measuring at 15,688-square-foot (1,457.5 m^{2}), it is the second largest in MLB. The script Tigers wordmark on top of the videoboard was replaced with the Comerica Park signage in 2025.

In 2014, the Tigers announced a $4 million renovation to the Comerica Landing. This renovation included the removal of the bleachers that once occupied the space and the addition of new stadium seats. The plan also included new high top tables, a new bar in the middle of the porch, couches and lounge chairs, as well as a fire pit. The bleachers that once occupied the area were moved to the space above The Jungle restaurant and bar.

There is a fireworks show after Friday evening games usually starting after Memorial Day.

== Dimensions ==
In contrast to Tiger Stadium, which had long been considered one of the most hitter-friendly parks in baseball, Comerica Park is considered to be extremely friendly to pitchers. Except for dead center field, the outfield dimensions were more expansive than those at Tiger Stadium. This led to complaints from players and fans alike. Most famously, Bobby Higginson sarcastically referred to the venue as "Comerica National Park".

Before the start of the 2003 MLB season, the club moved the distance from left-center field from 395 to 370 feet (120 to 113 m). This also removed the flagpole from the field of play, originally incorporated as an homage to Tiger Stadium. Two years later, the bullpens were moved from right field to an empty area in left field created when the fence was moved in. In place of the old bullpens in right field, about 950 seats were added. This made one of the most pitcher-friendly ballparks transform into the third most batter-friendly (with extra bases also taken into account).

Prior to the 2023 MLB season, the club announced that the center field fence would be moved in 10 feet, measuring at 412 feet (126 m), while left field would be relabeled at 342 feet (104 m). This was due to the actual distances from home plate being revealed via laser measurements. The club also announced that the center field, right-center field, and right field fences would be lowered to 7 feet.

Of all MLB stadiums, Comerica Park features the most southward orientation, resulting in the batter facing further south than at any other ballpark.

== Transportation ==
Public transportation for the park is available via the Detroit People Mover station at its Broadway and Grand Circus Park stations, and the QLine at Montcalm Street, in addition to SMART, which runs regional routes from the suburbs, and DDOT.

== Stadium use ==
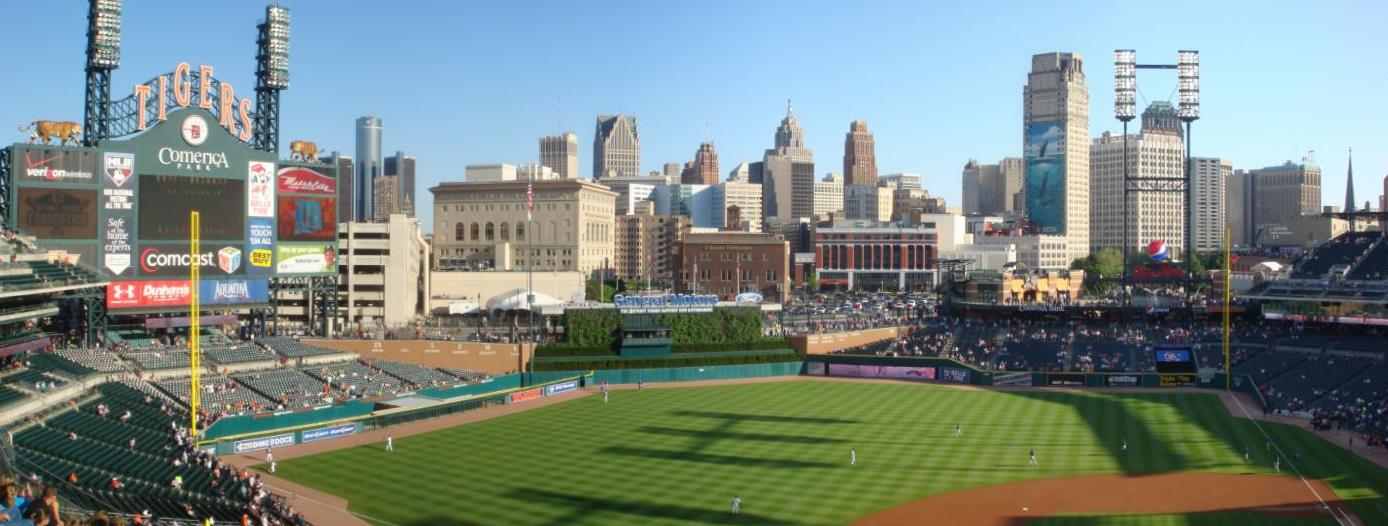
Downtown Detroit skyline as seen from upper deck in 2009.

=== Baseball ===
In 2005, Comerica Park hosted the 76th MLB All-Star Game, the first to be played in Detroit since 1971. In the Home Run Derby, held the day before, Bobby Abreu hit 24 home runs in the first round, breaking the previous record of 15. Abreu won the Derby over Tigers catcher Iván Rodríguez, hitting a then record 41 homers during the event. In the All-Star Game, the American League won 7–5 with Miguel Tejada winning the game's MVP Award.

The first playoff game at Comerica Park was played on October 6, 2006, against the New York Yankees. On October 21, 2006, Comerica Park hosted the first World Series game in the history of the ballpark (Game 1 of the 2006 World Series).

In 2008, the Tiger statue at the main entrance of the ballpark was dressed with a Detroit Red Wings jersey as the Red Wings were playing against the Pittsburgh Penguins in the Stanley Cup Finals. The jersey is usually worn by the Spirit of Detroit, but it was undergoing restoration during that time.

On August 15, 2011, Minnesota Twins slugger Jim Thome became the eighth player in baseball history to hit 600 career home runs.

Comerica Park hosted its second World Series in 2012, with the Tigers getting swept by the San Francisco Giants.

On April 23, 2022, Tigers slugger Miguel Cabrera became the 33rd player in Major League history to get his 3,000th hit with a single in the first inning off of Colorado Rockies pitcher Antonio Senzatela.

Only two no-hitters have been thrown at Comerica Park, both by the Tigers. On June 12, 2007, the first no-hitter was thrown at Comerica Park by Justin Verlander. The Tigers won the game 4–0 against the Milwaukee Brewers. It was also the first no-hitter thrown by a Tiger in the city of Detroit since Virgil Trucks accomplished the feat in 1952. Then on July 8, 2023, Matt Manning, Jason Foley and Alex Lange threw a combined no-hitter in a 2–0 victory against the Toronto Blue Jays.

Comerica Park also played host to a near-perfect game by Armando Galarraga against the Cleveland Indians on June 2, 2010. Galarraga retired the first 26 batters he faced, but was denied both a perfect game and no-hitter when umpire Jim Joyce erroneously awarded Indians batter Jason Donald an infield single with two outs in the ninth inning.

=== Concerts ===
Date	Artist	Opening act(s)	Tour/concert name	Attendance	Revenue	Note(s)	Reference(s)
July 5, 2000	Dave Matthews Band	Ben Harper; Ozomatli		43,822	$2,037,723	The first act to play at the ballpark.	
June 3, 2001	Dave Matthews Band	Macy Gray					
June 4, 2001	Dave Matthews Band	Macy Gray					
June 29, 2001	NSYNC		PopOdyssey			Moved from the Pontiac Silverdome. A second show was later added.	
June 30, 2001	NSYNC		PopOdyssey			Moved from the Pontiac Silverdome. A second show was later added.	
September 1, 2001	Luther Vandross; Missy Elliott; Frankie Beverly; Maze; Ginuwine; Tank; Erick Sermon; The Isley Brothers		Ford Detroit Music Festival				
July 19, 2003	Bon Jovi	Goo Goo Dolls; Sheryl Crow	Bounce Tour	32,507 / 40,330	$1,969,069		
September 7, 2003	Kiss; Aerosmith	Ted Nugent; Saliva	Rocksimus Maximus Tour/World Domination Tour	41,000		Postponed from August 15, due to the blackout that occurred the day before.	
September 21, 2003	Bruce Springsteen and the E Street Band		The Rising Tour	27,728 / 37,437	$2,048,816		
August 12, 2005	Eminem; 50 Cent; G-Unit; Lil' Jon; Lil' Scrappy; Limp Bizkit; Papa Roach		Anger Management Tour				
August 13, 2005	Eminem; 50 Cent; G-Unit; Lil' Jon; Lil' Scrappy; Limp Bizkit; Papa Roach		Anger Management Tour				
August 31, 2005	The Rolling Stones	Maroon 5	A Bigger Bang				
July 17, 2009	Kid Rock	Lynyrd Skynyrd; Robert Randolph and the Family Band	Rock N' Rebels Tour 2009			A second show was added. Lynyrd Skynyrd and Robert Randolph and the Family Band opened the first show, while Alice in Chains and Cypress Hill opened the second show.	
July 18, 2009	Kid Rock	Alice in Chains Cypress Hill	Rock N' Rebels Tour 2009			A second show was added. Lynyrd Skynyrd and Robert Randolph and the Family Band opened the first show, while Alice in Chains and Cypress Hill opened the second show.	
July 30, 2010	Sum 41		Screaming Bloody Murder Tour			This concert was part of the Vans Warped Tour 2010.	
September 2, 2010	Eminem; Jay-Z	B.o.B	The Home & Home Tour			Special guests with Eminem: 50 Cent, D12, The Alchemist, Trick Trick, G-Unit, Drake, and Dr. Dre. Special guests with Jay-Z: Memphis Bleek, Bridget Kelly, and Young Jeezy.	
September 3, 2010	Eminem; Jay-Z	B.o.B	The Home & Home Tour			Special guests with Eminem: 50 Cent, D12, The Alchemist, Trick Trick, G-Unit, Drake, and Dr. Dre. Special guests with Jay-Z: Memphis Bleek, Bridget Kelly, and Young Jeezy.	
July 24, 2011	Paul McCartney	DJ Chris Holmes	On the Run Tour	37,854 / 37,854	$3,470,134		
August 12, 2011	Kid Rock	Sammy Hagar	Born Free Tour				
August 13, 2011	Kid Rock	Sammy Hagar	Born Free Tour				
July 28, 2012	Jimmy Buffett	Lionel Richie	Lounging at the Lagoon Tour			This concert was one of the first times Jimmy Buffett and his band had played in such a large venue, and outdoors.	
July 20, 2013	Jimmy Buffett	Jackson Browne	Songs from St. Somewhere Tour				
May 30, 2014	Dierks Bentley	Chris Young; Chase Rice; Jon Pardi	Riser Tour			This concert was a part of the WYCD Hoedown.	
July 26, 2014	Jimmy Buffett	John Fogerty	This One's For You Tour			James Taylor was a special guest on "Mexico".	
August 22, 2014	Eminem; Rihanna		Monster Tour	105,092 / 105,092	$10,598,888	Rihanna became the first female headliner.	
August 23, 2014	Eminem; Rihanna		Monster Tour	105,092 / 105,092	$10,598,888	Rihanna became the first female headliner.	
July 8, 2015	The Rolling Stones	Walk the Moon	Zip Code Tour	36,712 / 36,712	$6,282,151		
September 12, 2015	Zac Brown Band	Drake White	Jekyll and Hyde Tour				
July 12, 2017	Metallica	Volbeat; Avenged Sevenfold; Mix Master Mike	WorldWired Tour	40,573 / 43,159	$4,501,650		
July 13, 2018	Journey; Def Leppard	The Pretenders	Def Leppard & Journey 2018 Tour	31,383 / 31,383	$2,521,174		
July 14, 2018	Zac Brown Band	OneRepublic; Nahko and Medicine for the People	Down the Rabbit Hole Live				
August 8, 2021	Guns N' Roses	Mammoth WVH	We're F'N' Back! Tour	19,105 / 21,000	$1,824,930	This concert was originally scheduled to take place on July 11, 2020, but was postponed due to the COVID-19 pandemic.	
August 10, 2021	Green Day; Weezer; Fall Out Boy	The Interrupters	Hella Mega Tour	32,552 / 32,552	$2,920,060	This concert was originally scheduled to take place on August 19, 2020, but was postponed due to the COVID-19 pandemic.	
July 8, 2022	Chris Stapleton	Nathaniel Rateliff; Marthy Stuart; Madeline Edwards	Chris Stapleton's All-American Road Show Tour				
July 9, 2022	Billy Joel		Billy Joel in Concert			This concert was originally scheduled to take place on July 10, 2020, and July 9, 2021, but were postponed due to the COVID-19 pandemic.	
July 10, 2022	Def Leppard; Mötley Crüe; Poison; Joan Jett & The Blackhearts	Classless Act	The Stadium Tour	35,097 / 35,097		This concert was originally scheduled to take place on August 20, 2020, and July 10, 2021, but was postponed due to the COVID-19 pandemic.	
July 18, 2022	Elton John		Farewell Yellow Brick Road Tour	33,838 / 33,838	$4,267,268		
August 14, 2022	Red Hot Chili Peppers	The Strokes; Thundercat	2022 Global Stadium Tour	30,112 / 30,112	$4,048,198		
August 16, 2023	P!nk	Grouplove; KidCutUp; Brandi Carlile	Summer Carnival	45,000 / 45,000		Largest concert attendance	
July 18, 2024	Def Leppard; Journey	Steve Miller Band	The Summer Stadium Tour				
September 4, 2024	Green Day	The Smashing Pumpkins; Rancid; The Linda Lindas	The Saviors Tour				
September 13, 2025	The Lumineers	The Backseat Lovers; Chance Peña	Automatic World Tour				
August 21, 2026	My Chemical Romance	Iggy Pop	Long Live The Black Parade				

=== Hockeytown Winter Festival ===
On February 9, 2012, NHL commissioner Gary Bettman announced that Comerica Park would host the Hockeytown Winter Festival in concert with the 2013 NHL Winter Classic held at Michigan Stadium. The festival was to include events such as games between teams in the Ontario Hockey League, the American Hockey League, the Great Lakes Invitational, youth hockey games, and the NHL alumni game. Due to the 2012–13 NHL lockout, the festival was cancelled. The festival was rescheduled for December 2013. An outdoor rink was set up on the infield of the ballpark for public skating and hockey games.

=== Soccer ===
On July 19, 2017, Comerica Park hosted its first ever soccer game between Roma of the Italian Serie A League against Paris Saint-Germain of France's Ligue 1 in the 2017 International Champions Cup tournament.

On July 30, 2023, Crystal Palace of the English Premier League and Sevilla of Spain's La Liga played against each other at Comerica Park.

Date	Winning team	Result	Losing team	Tournament	Attendance
July 19, 2017	(France) Paris Saint-Germain	1–1; 5–3 (pens.)	(Italy) Roma	Friendly (2017 International Champions Cup)	36,289
July 30, 2023	(Spain) Sevilla	1–1; 1–0 (pens.)	(England) Crystal Palace	Friendly (2023 Motor City Cup)	21,000+

== See also ==
- Tourism in metropolitan Detroit
- Heather Nabozny
- List of ballparks by capacity
- List of current Major League Baseball stadiums
- Lists of stadiums

Events and tenants
Preceded by Tiger Stadium	Home of the Detroit Tigers; 2000–present	Succeeded by current
Preceded by Minute Maid Park	Host of the All-Star Game; 2005	Succeeded by PNC Park
