= Times Square (disambiguation) =

Times Square is an entertainment and business district in New York City, United States.

Times Square may also refer to:

== Places ==
=== Canada ===
- Times Square, a Chinese theme mall in Richmond Hill, Ontario

=== China ===
- Harmony Times Square
- Times Square station (Suzhou Rail Transit)

=== Hong Kong ===
- Times Square (Hong Kong), a shopping, entertainment and office complex in Causeway Bay

=== Malaysia ===
- Berjaya Times Square, a 2003 office and shopping center in Kuala Lumpur
- Penang Times Square, a complex of residential and commercial properties in George Town, Penang

=== South Korea ===
- Times Square (shopping mall), a shopping mall in Seoul

=== United Kingdom ===
- Times Square, a shopping centre in Sutton, London
- Times Square, Newcastle upon Tyne, the location of the Centre for Life complex

=== United States ===
- Times Square (Detroit), a street in downtown Detroit, Michigan
  - Times Square (Detroit People Mover), a Detroit People Mover station
- Times Square – 42nd Street (New York City Subway), a New York City Subway station complex
  - Times Square – 42nd Street (IRT Broadway – Seventh Avenue Line)
  - Times Square – 42nd Street (BMT Broadway Line)
  - Times Square (IRT Flushing Line)
  - Times Square (IRT 42nd Street Shuttle)
- Times Square Church, a church near Times Square, New York City

=== Vietnam ===
- Saigon Times Square in Ho Chi Minh City (formerly Saigon)

== Other uses ==
- Times Square (1929 film)
- Times Square (1980 film)
  - Times Square (soundtrack), 1980 soundtrack album for the film
- Times Square (Gary Burton album), a 1978 album
- Times Square (The Undead EP), an album by Bobby Steele
- Times Square, an unreleased album by Neil Young
- Times Square (Neuhaus), a sound art installation

== See also ==
- One Times Square, the location of The New York Times former headquarters building
