= Times Square station (Detroit) =

Detroit People Mover station

Times Square
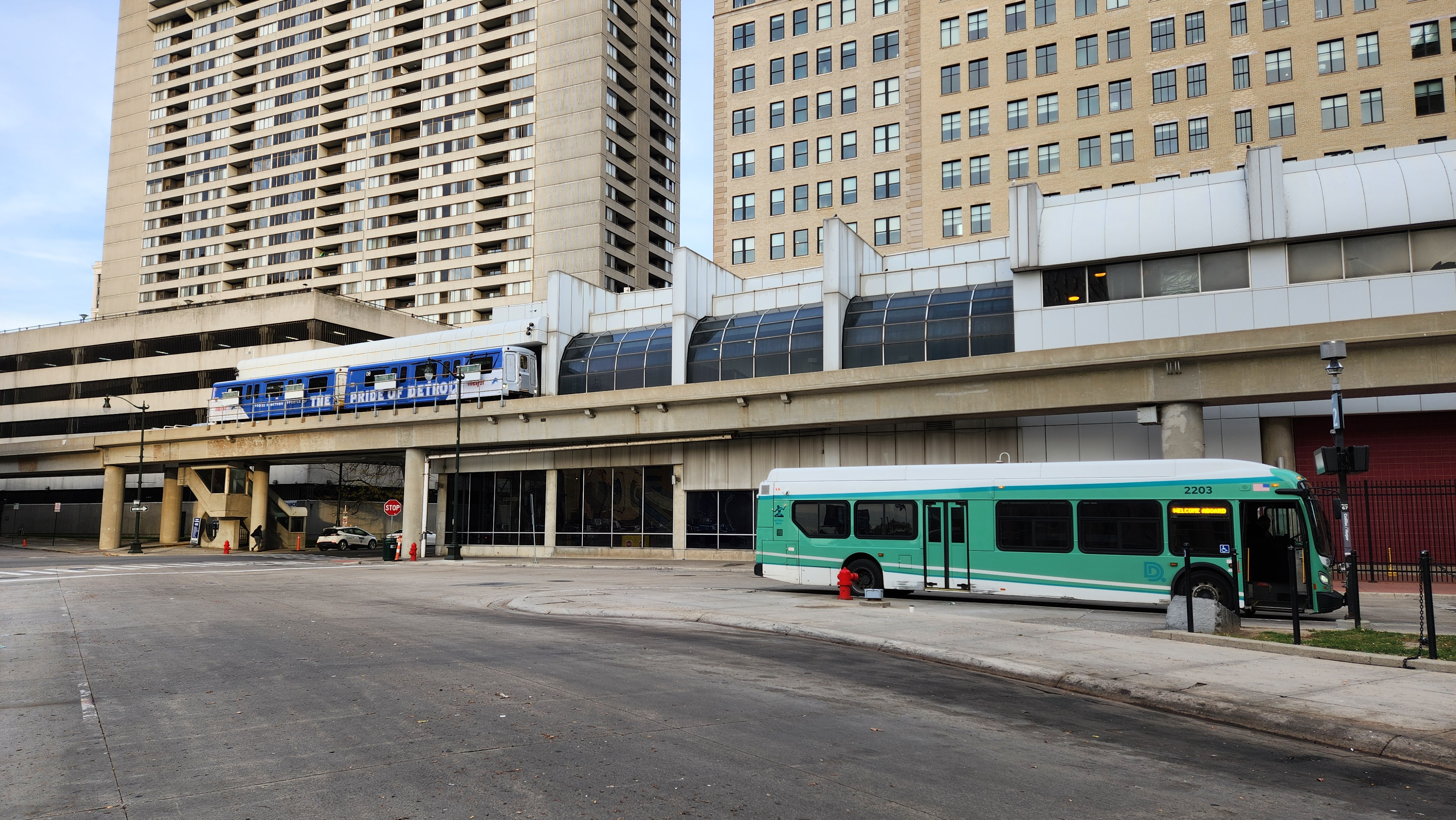
- Exterior, with Rosa Parks Transit Center platform in foreground

General information
- Location: 1250 Park Place; Detroit, Michigan 48226
- Coordinates: 42°20′01″N 83°03′08″W
- Owner: Detroit Transportation Corporation
- Platforms: 1 island platform
- Tracks: 2
- Connections: Rosa Parks Transit Center: DDOT 1, 2, 4, 5, 9, 16, 18, 19, 23, 27, 29, 31, 40, 52, 67

Construction
- Structure type: Elevated
- Accessible: yes

Other information
- Status: open

History
- Opened: July 31, 1987

Passengers
- 2014: 129,250
- Rank: 6 out of 13

Services
Preceding station	Detroit People Mover	Following station
Grand Circus Park One-way operation	Detroit People Mover	Michigan Next counter-clockwise
Location

Times Square station is a Detroit People Mover station in downtown Detroit, Michigan. It is located on Grand River Avenue between Cass Avenue and Washington Boulevard, adjacent to the Rosa Parks Transit Center, the main downtown hub of the Detroit Department of Transportation bus network. The station takes its name from nearby Times Square, which in turn, took the name from the defunct Detroit Times newspaper formerly headquartered there.

Times Square is the nearest People Mover station to Book Tower, DTE Energy Headquarters, Beacon Park, and MGM Grand Detroit, and the People Mover's garage and maintenance facilities are attached to the station. It is the only People Mover station with two tracks, one on the main loop and another leading into the garage, which flank the station's island platform.
