= Michigan station =

Michigan station may refer to:

- Michigan station (CTA), a rapid transit station under construction on the Chicago "L".
- Michigan station (Detroit), a Detroit People Mover station
- Michigan Central Station, a former railroad station in Detroit, Michigan, now used as a commercial office building
