= Fort/Cass station =

Detroit People Mover station

Fort/Cass
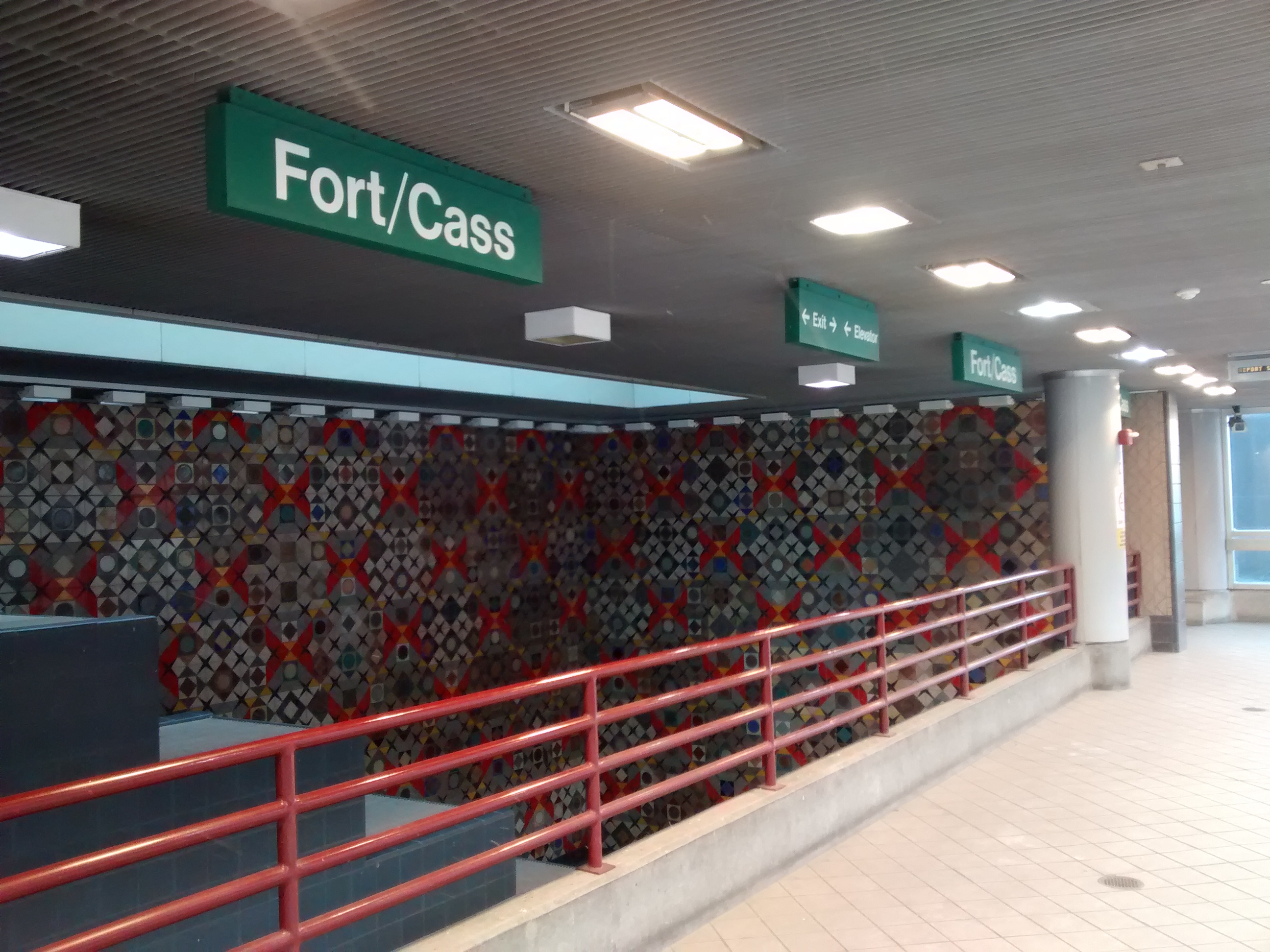

General information
- Location: 711 Cass Avenue; Detroit, Michigan 48226
- Coordinates: 42°19′46″N 83°03′04″W
- Owner: Detroit Transportation Corporation
- Platforms: 1 side platform
- Tracks: 1
- Connections: DDOT 1, 19, 27, 29

Construction
- Accessible: yes

History
- Opened: July 31, 1987

Passengers
- 2014: 61,826
- Rank: 13 out of 13

Services
Preceding station	Detroit People Mover	Following station
Michigan One-way operation	Detroit People Mover	Huntington Place Next counter-clockwise
Location

Fort/Cass station is a Detroit People Mover station in Downtown Detroit, Michigan. It is located at the intersection of Fort Street and Cass Avenue, from which it takes its name.

Fort/Cass is the nearest People Mover station to the Theodore Levin United States Courthouse, John K. King Books, Fort Street Presbyterian Church, WDIV-TV's studios, and the Detroit intercity bus terminal.

The People Mover shut down temporarily on March 30, 2020, due to decreased ridership amid the COVID-19 pandemic. Following the system's May 2022 restart, the station reopened on September 14, 2022.
