= Executive Plaza =

Executive Plaza can refer to:

- Executive Plaza Building (Detroit, Michigan)
- Executive Plaza at Rockefeller Center, mixed use apartment and hotel in New York City
