= Clyde Ludwick Harcourt =

American artist and inventor

Clyde Ludwick Harcourt (born Clyde Ludwick; 28 September 1885 – 21 November 1927) was an American artist, illustrator, and inventor.

== Biography ==
Ludwick worked at the Western Engraving Company in 1910, living in Seattle. She became a staff artist for the Seattle Daily Times through 1915.

She married Matthew H. Harcourt, who ran hotels in Seattle, and had one daughter, named Natalie.

== Works ==
Ludwick was featured in newspapers such as the Detroit Times in the summer of 1916 and the New York Herald in 1917.

Ludwick spawned the creation of pennants in her style, sold by The Bon Marché.

Shortly before her death, Ludwick filed for a patent for a mechanical manikin, which was awarded posthumously.
