= Huntington Place station =

Detroit People Mover station

Huntington Place
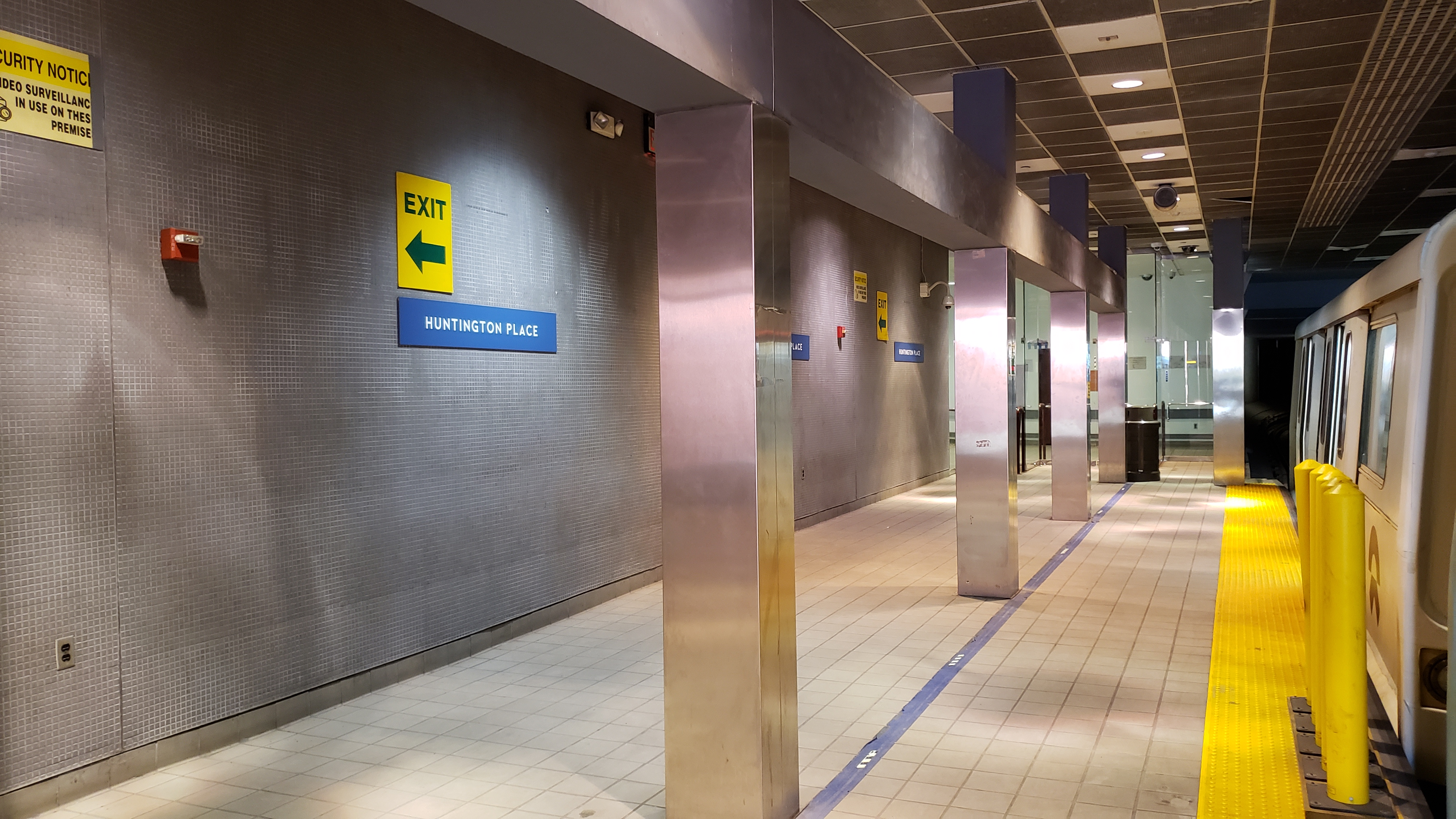

General information
- Location: 1 Washington Boulevard, Floor 3 Detroit, Michigan 48226; United States
- Coordinates: 42°19′42″N 83°03′00″W
- Owner: Detroit Transportation Corporation
- Platforms: 1 side platform
- Tracks: 1

Construction
- Structure type: Elevated
- Accessible: Yes

History
- Opened: November 14, 1988
- Former names: Cobo Hall (1988–1989); Cobo Center (1989–2019); Convention Center (2019–2022)

Passengers
- 2014: 258,026
- Rank: 3 out of 13

Services
Preceding station	Detroit People Mover	Following station
Fort/Cass One-way operation	Detroit People Mover	Water Square Next counter-clockwise
Location

Huntington Place station (formerly Cobo Center) is a Detroit People Mover station in downtown Detroit, Michigan. It is located inside the Huntington Place convention center, on the third floor near Congress Street, with elevators and escalators inside the building connecting the station to street level.

As of 2026, Huntington Place station closes nightly at 10:00 p.m., earlier than the rest of the system, except during major events at the facility.

== History ==
The track was originally built out in the open, and later enclosed by Cobo Center's late-1980s expansion. The station opened as an infill station on November 14, 1988, as the last of the system's thirteen stations to open. The track passes above the main convention hall, so passing trains can be heard from portions of the convention floor.

Originally known as Cobo Hall briefly before becoming Cobo Center in 1989, the station was renamed Convention Center in August 2019, when Cobo Center itself was renamed TCF Center. The station operated as Convention Center for less than a year before the People Mover shut down temporarily on March 30, 2020, due to decreased ridership amid the COVID-19 pandemic. In November 2021, while the People Mover was shut down, the convention center adopted its current name; and when the system reopened on May 20, 2022, the station was renamed Huntington Place.

== Public art ==
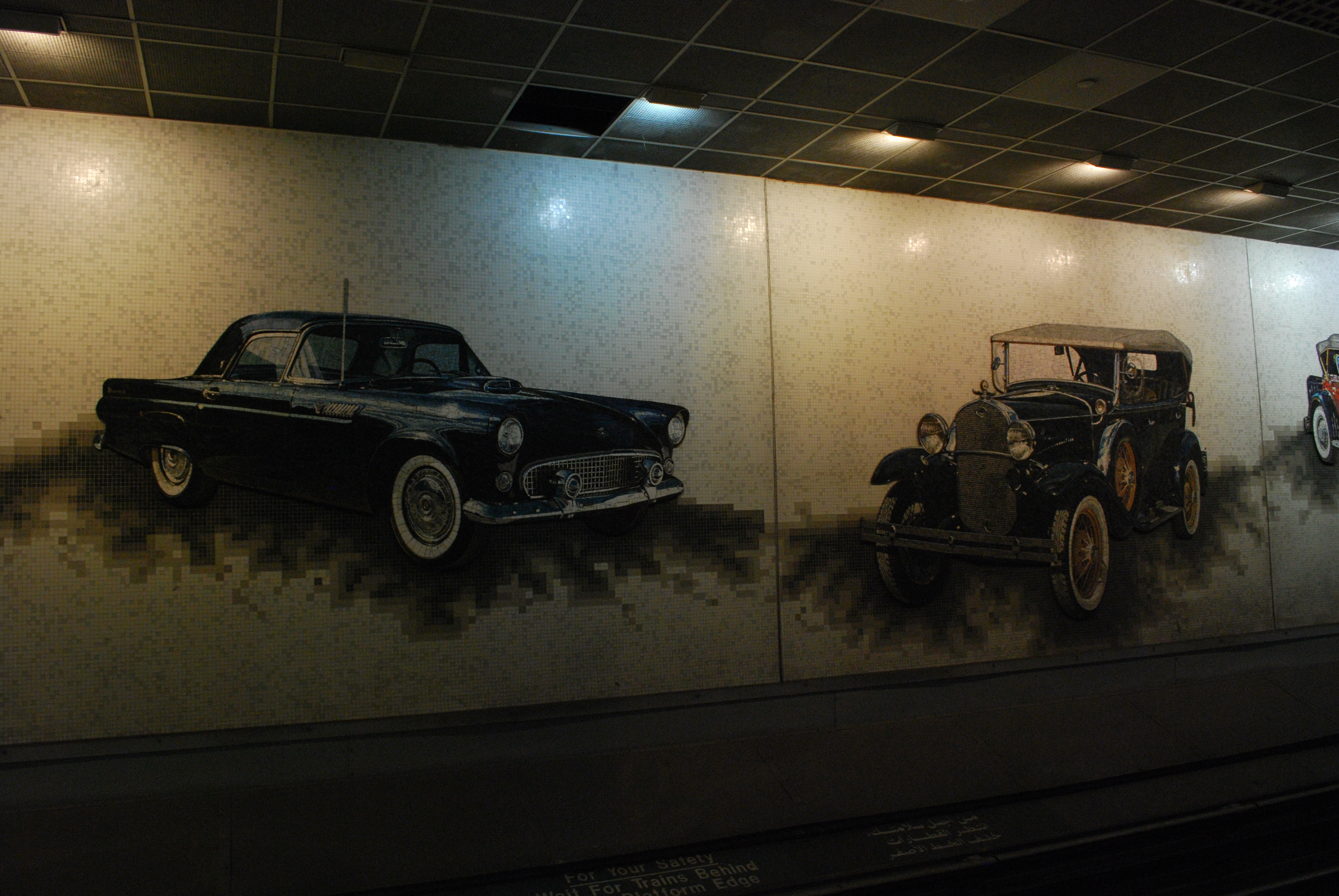
Cavalcade of Cars

A Venetian glass mosaic, Cavalcade of Cars, is displayed on the wall opposite the platform. Created by Linda Cianciolo Scarlett and Larry Ebel, Cavalcade of Cars features seven automobiles, of various makes and models from the 1930s to the 1950s: two Chrysler, two Ford, one Buick, one Chevrolet, and one Cord. The mosaic celebrates Detroit's automotive industry, and references the Detroit Auto Show, the most prominent event hosted at Huntington Place.
