= Rosa Parks Transit Center =

Bus terminal in Detroit, Michigan

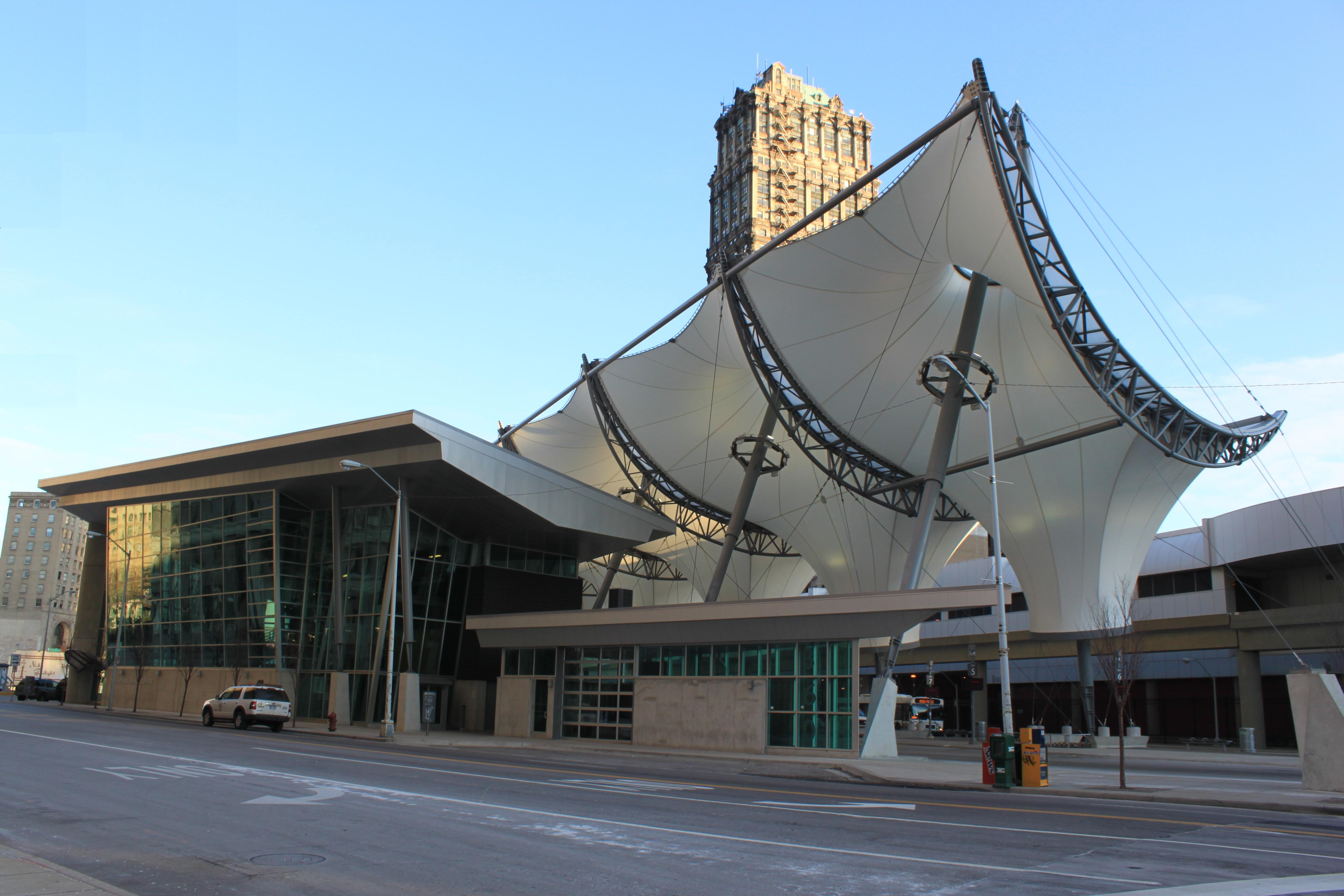

General information
- Location: 360 Michigan Avenue; Detroit, Michigan; United States
- Coordinates: 42°19′57″N 83°03′09″W
- Owner: City of Detroit
- Bus routes: 1, 2, 4, 5, 9, 16, 18, 19, 23, 27, 29, 31, 40, 52, 67
- Bus stands: 15
- Bus operators: DDOT; SMART; Transit Windsor
- Connections: Detroit People Mover at Michigan and Times Square; Detroit Air Xpress; DDOT 3, 6 SMART FAST 261 Michigan

Construction
- Accessible: Yes
- Architect: Parsons Brinckerhoff
- Architectural style: Tensile structure

History
- Opened: July 14, 2009

Services
Preceding station	Detroit People Mover	Following station
Out-of-system interchange
Michigan One-way operation	Detroit People Mover transfer at Times Square	Grand Circus Park Next counter-clockwise
Location

The Rosa Parks Transit Center is the main local bus station in Detroit, Michigan serving as the central hub for the Detroit Department of Transportation (DDOT) bus system. The station was built on the site of Times Square in the west end of Downtown Detroit.

== Description ==
The three-story, 25,700-square-foot (2,390 m^{2}) structure includes space for restrooms, an indoor waiting area, retail space, transit police offices, and a Detroit Police Department mini-station. The most distinguishing feature of the transit center is its soaring tensile canopy. The transit center building was designed by Parsons Brinckerhoff, and the canopy by FTL Design Engineering Studio of Detroit.

Besides acting as the central hub of DDOT, the station is a stop on many SMART routes which connect the city to its suburbs and a stop for Megabus. Until it was cancelled in 2025, the Transit Windsor Tunnel Bus, a commuter and special bus service connecting the downtowns of Detroit and Windsor, served the facility. The Detroit People Mover's Times Square and Michigan stations are across the street from the transit center.

== History ==
Announced in 2005, the project was developed by the Detroit Economic Growth Corporation. It began construction in 2007 and was opened for service in July 2009 at a total cost of $22.5 million.
