= Suzhou Sky Screen =

World's largest video screen

The Suzhou Sky Screen located in the Harmony Times Square (part of the Times Square mixed-use complex in Suzhou, China) is currently the world's largest video screen. It is the world's third "Sky Screen" (the first two being at the Fremont Street Experience in Las Vegas, Nevada, United States and at The Place in Beijing). The screen's display dimensions are 500 by 32 metres (1,640 by 105 ft) and it is 172,220 square feet (16,000 m^{2}) in size.
