= John K. King Books =

Used Book Store In Detroit, MI

Coordinates: 42°19′38.51″N 83°3′24.21″W

John K. King Used & Rare Books
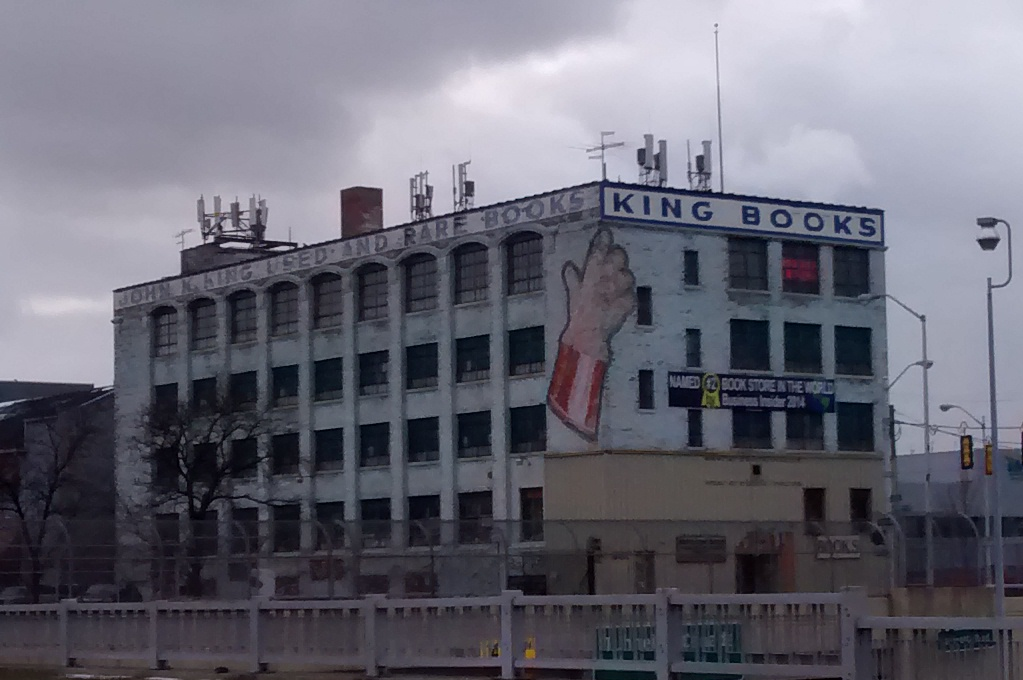
- Industry: Books
- Founder: John K. King
- Headquarters: 901 West Lafayette, Detroit, Michigan, U.S.
- Number of locations: 2
- Area served: Detroit metropolitan area
- Key people: John K. King
- Website: www.kingbooksdetroit.com

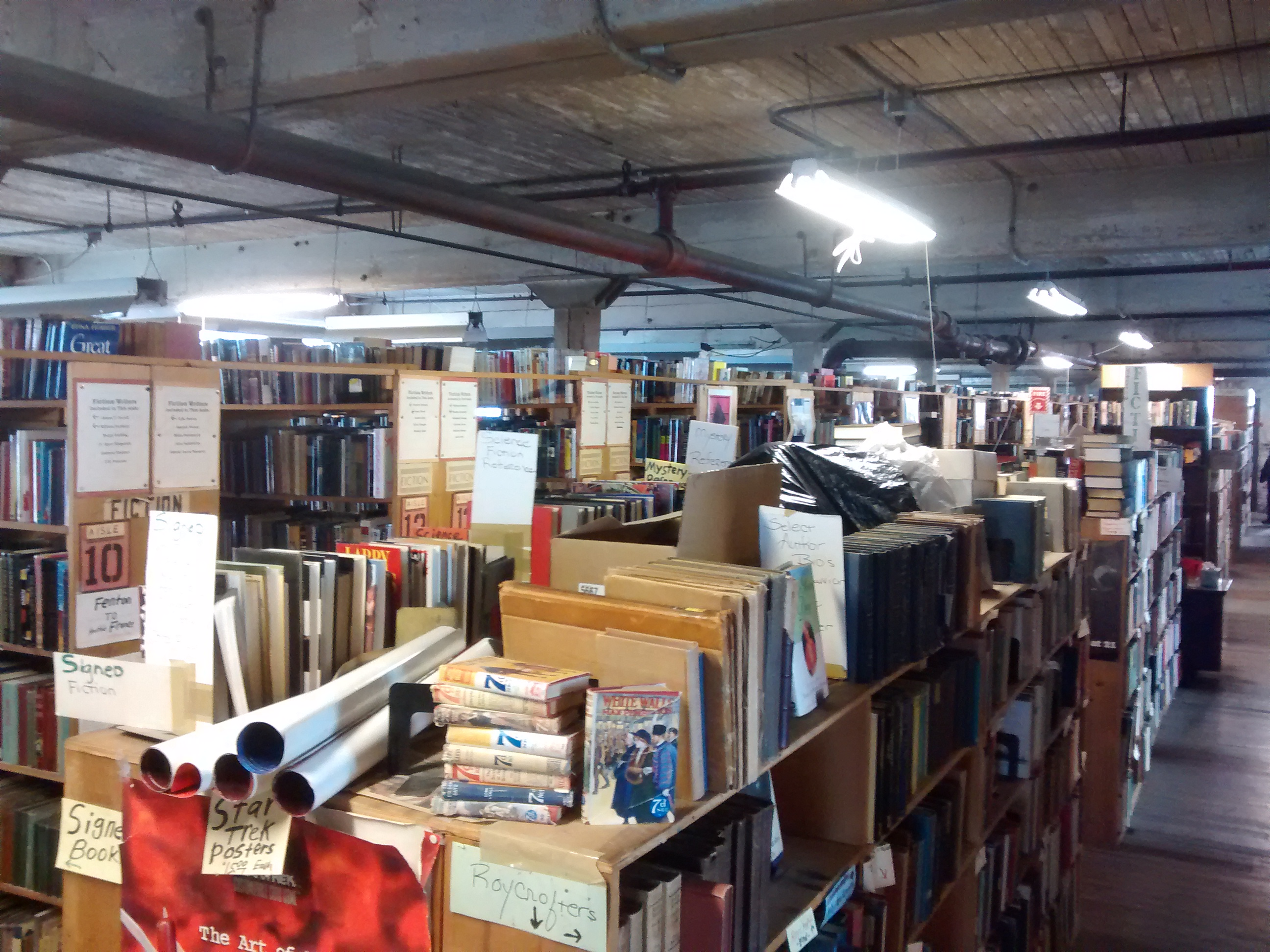
Interior

John K. King Used & Rare Books is an independent bookseller in Michigan.

The store has an estimated 1 million books in stock, with a large collection of rare and used titles. In a 2011 article from the online magazine Salon, the store was described as "one of the largest and strangest collections in North America".

The store has four above-ground floors open to customers. An adjacent building has a collection of rarer and notable items available for viewing by appointment only. The rare book holdings are the only cataloged part of the inventory and can be viewed and ordered by visiting rarebooklink.com.

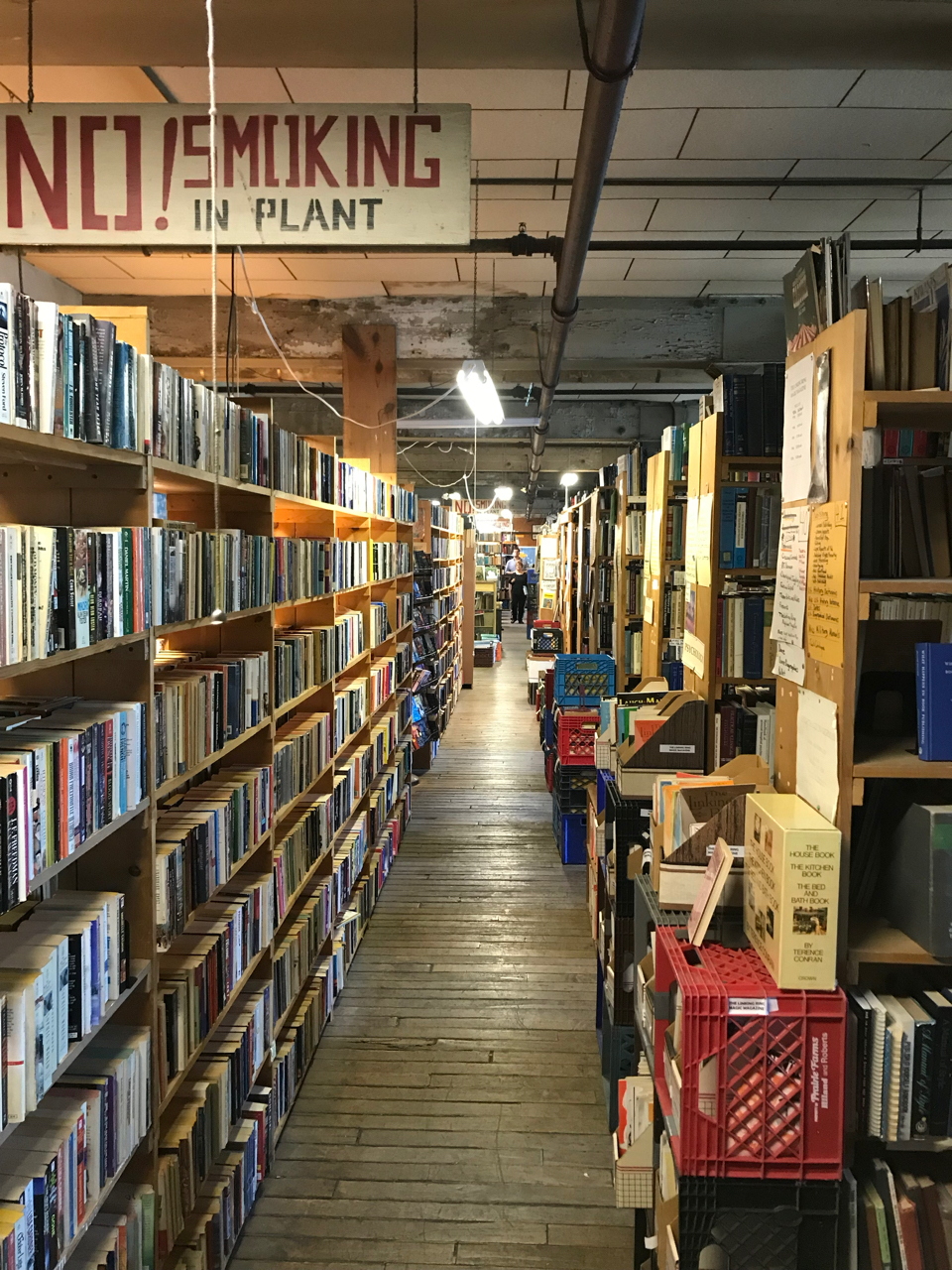

== History ==
The store was established in Dearborn, Michigan by John K. King in 1965. In 1971 it was moved to the Michigan Theatre in downtown Detroit. In 1983 King purchased the abandoned Advance Glove factory, which has since housed the store's collections. Later, two smaller stores were opened: John K. King Books North in Detroit's Ferndale suburb and The Big Book Store in the Cass Corridor neighborhood, adjacent to Wayne State University, specializing in rare comics and paperbacks.
