= DTE Energy Headquarters =

Skyscraper in Detroit

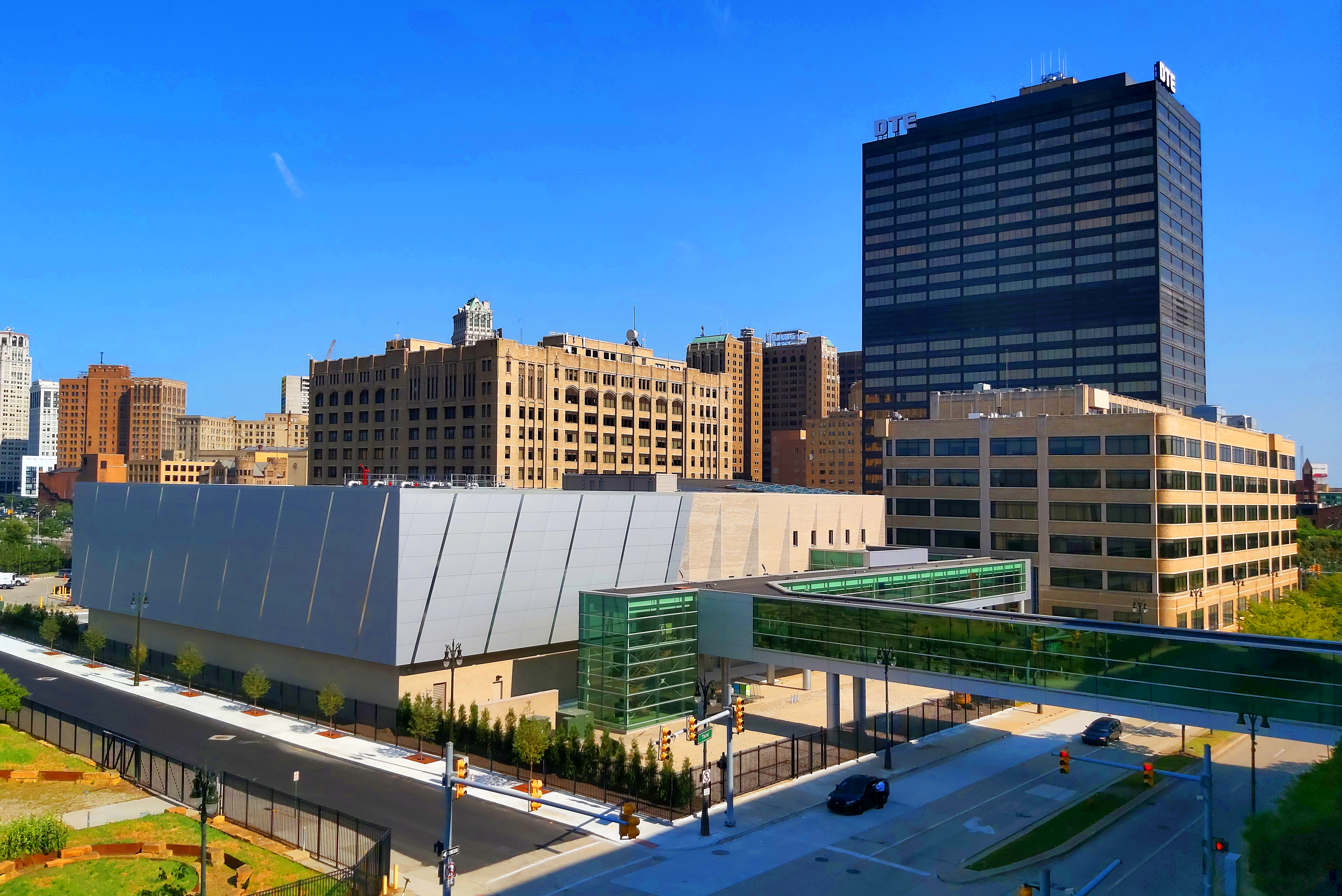
- Interactive map of the DTE Energy Headquarters area

General information
- Location: One Energy Plaza; Detroit, Michigan
- Coordinates: 42.33363°N 83.05783°W
- Construction started: 1965
- Completed: 1971

Height
- Antenna spire: 121.6 m (399 ft)
- Roof: 114.3 m (375 ft)

Technical details
- Floor count: 25
- Floor area: 190,500 m^{2} (2,050,525 sq ft)
- Lifts/elevators: 12

Design and construction
- Architect: Emery Roth & Sons

Other information
- Public transit: DDOT 2, 3, 6,

DTE Energy Headquarters is a class-A office complex at I-75 and Grand River on the west side of Downtown Detroit, Michigan. It consists of three buildings: the Walker Cisler Building, General Office Building, and the Service Building.

== Detroit Campus ==
Named for DTE's chairman at the time of its construction, the Walker Cisler Building is the large, dark brown skyscraper in the complex. The lighted signs at the top of the building display "DTE". It was constructed in 1971, and contains 25 floors, reaching a height of 114 m (374 ft 0 in). It is built in the International style of architecture with a steel frame and glass curtain wall. It bears an architectural resemblance to the nearby Executive Plaza Building. The building sits on Plaza Drive, once known as Jones street, before being renamed. In 2007, DTE announced a transformation of the area around its downtown headquarters into landscaped areas with a reflecting pool and walkway adjacent to the MGM Grand Detroit.

The General Office Building is located at 2000 Second Ave. between Elizabeth St. and Beech St. It was constructed in 1921 and stands at eleven stories in height. The building, designed in the renaissance revival architectural style, is used primarily for offices.

The Service Building is a lowrise building that stands at 6 floors in height, and was completed in 1938. It stands on Third Ave. between Elizabeth St. and Beech St.

The ESOC (Electrical Systems Operations Center) Building is a three-story building. Construction of the ESOC Building started in 2017, and was completed in 2021. It stands at the south-east corner of Third Ave and Plum St.

Walker Cisler Building, General Office Building and Service Building are connected with one another by a covered cafeteria and meeting space in the middle of these three buildings, on the second floor level. The Service Building and the ESOC Building are connected to the MGM Grand Casino Parking structure at the second floor level via a covered walkway. DTE shares use of the parking structure along with casino guests.

== Gallery ==
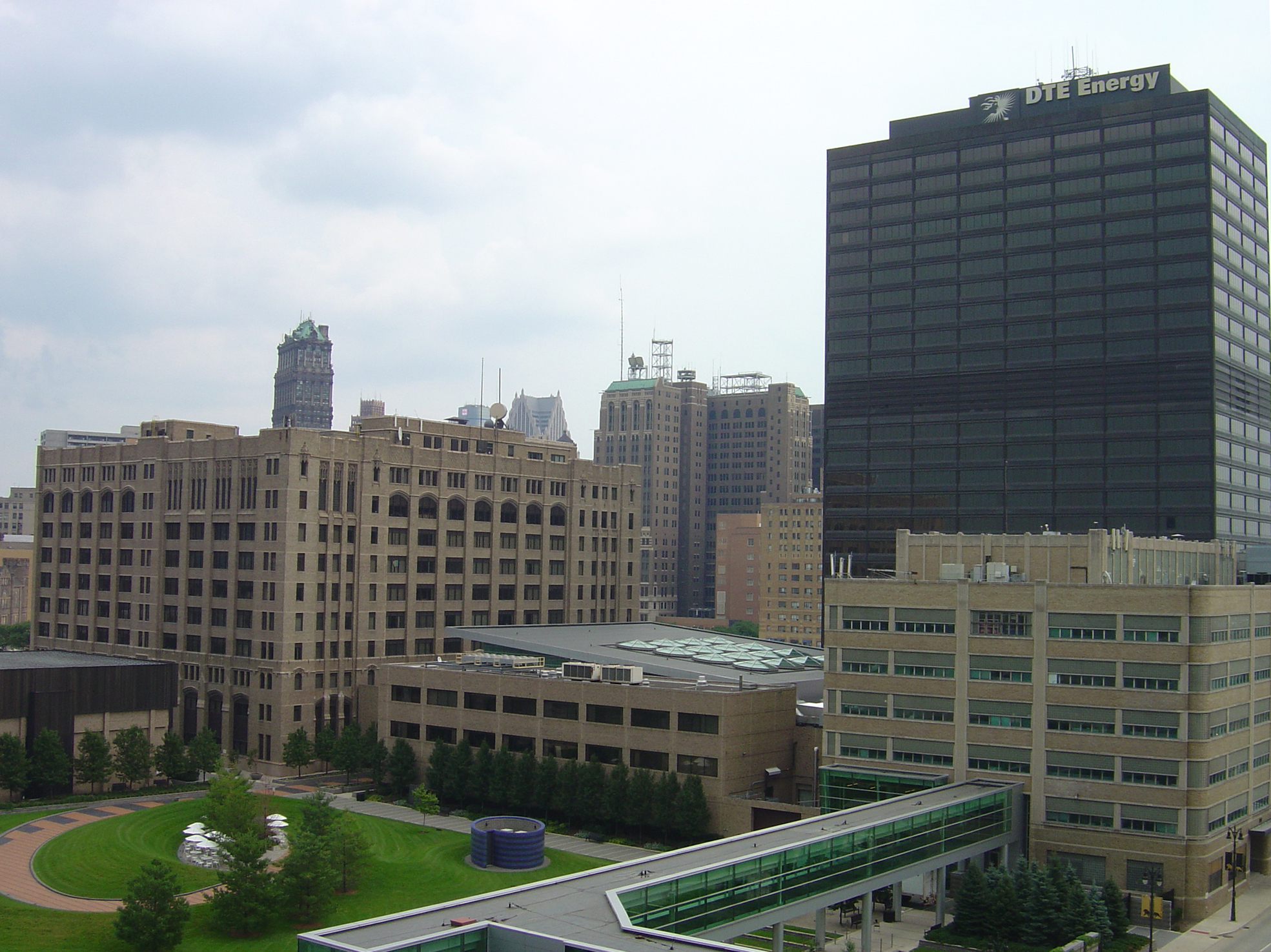
DTE Headquarters 2008 Campus Improvements as seen from the MGM Grand Casino parking, August 2011

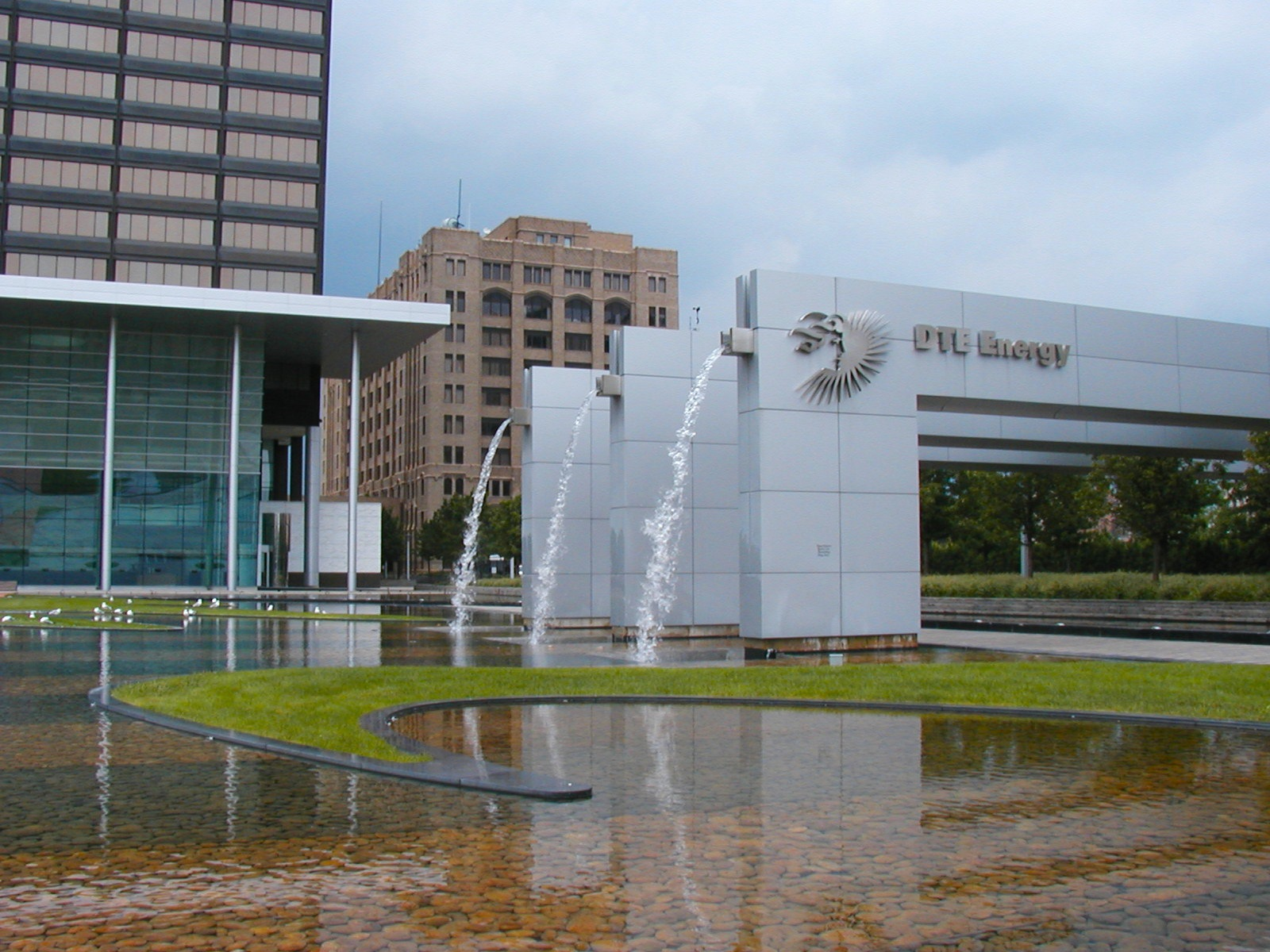
DTE Headquarters Campus Urban Oasis Gardens as seen from Bagley Street

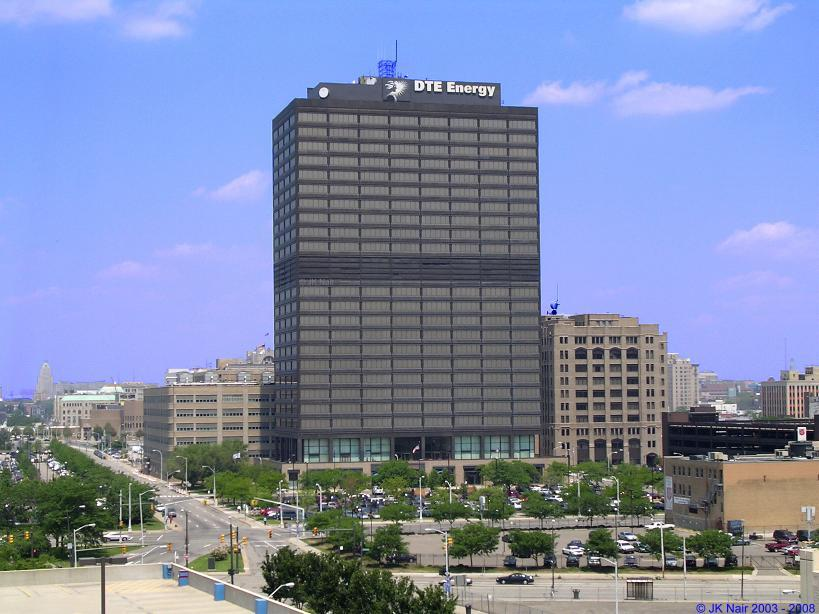
DTE Headquarters as seen from the Detroit Public Safety Headquarters parking structure, in 2003

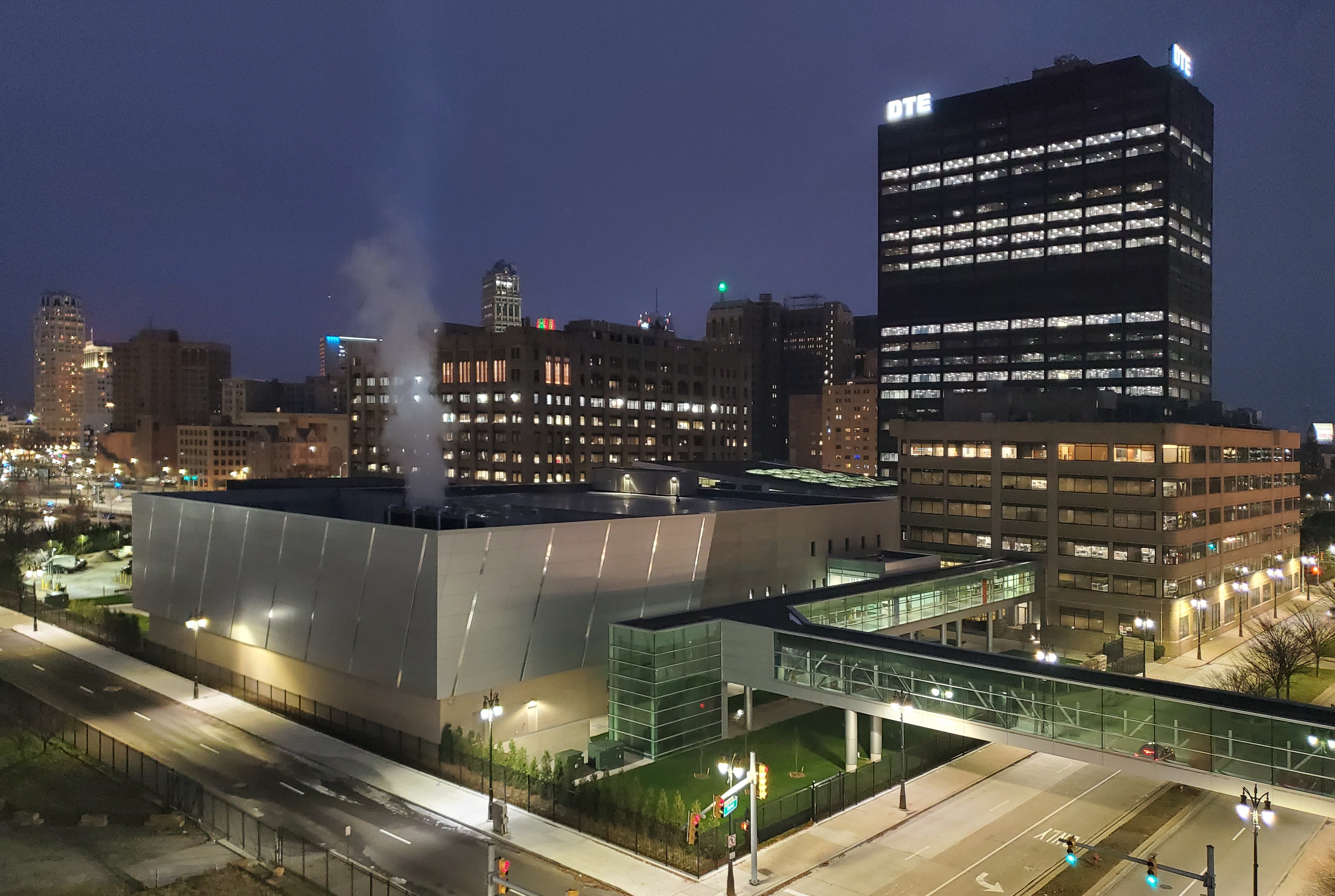
DTE Energy Headquarters at dusk

== See also ==
- Walker Lee Cisler
- List of tallest buildings in Detroit
