= Harmony Times Square =

Shopping mall in Suzhou, Jiangsu, China

Coordinates: 31.321220°N 120.708444°E

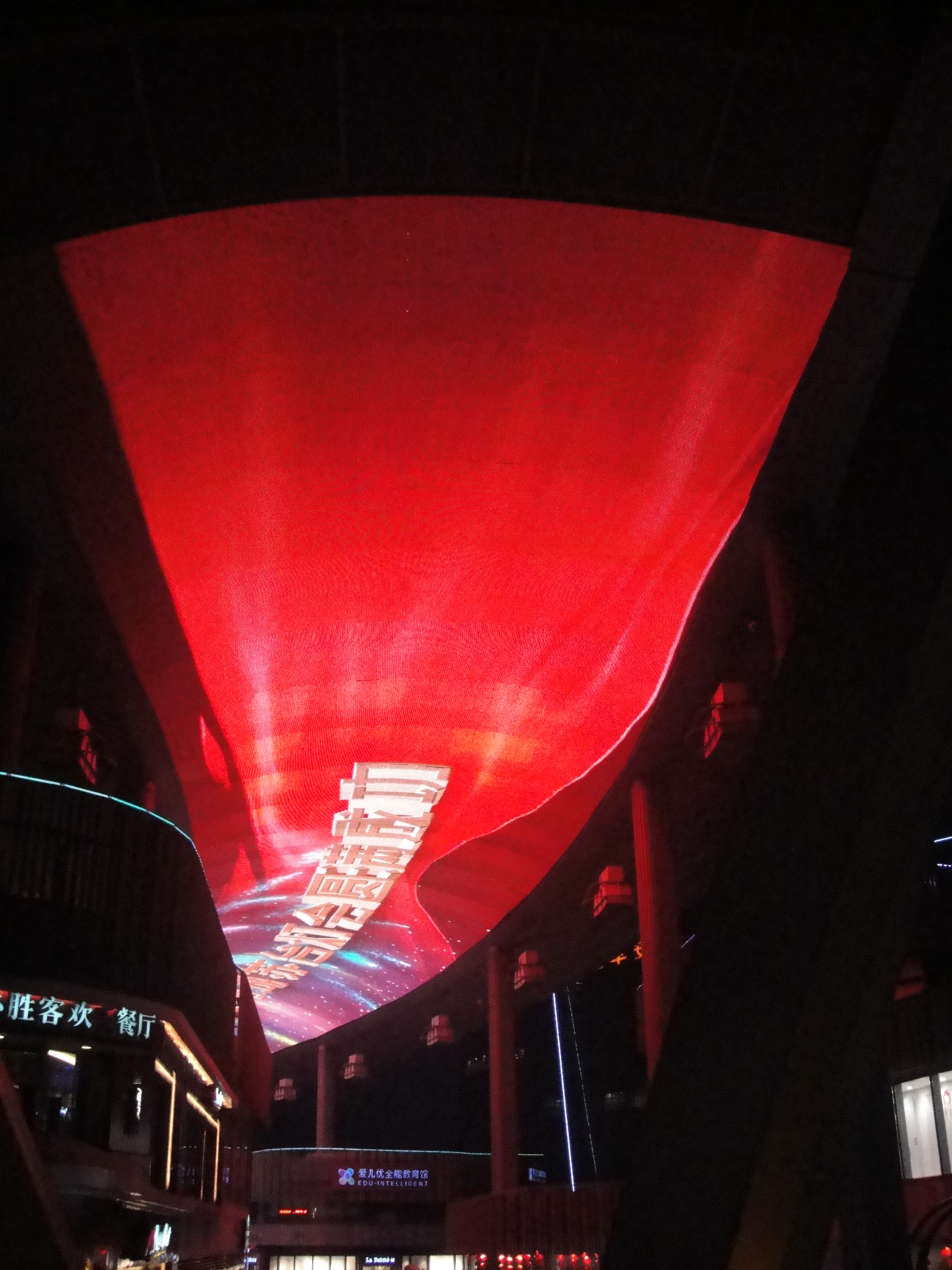
A part of the 500-meter long LED screen

Harmony Times Square (Chinese: 圆融时代广场) is a business complex located in Suzhou Industrial Park, Suzhou, Jiangsu, China, close to the east bank of Jinji Lake. It occupies an area of 210,000 square meters. The square has become a landmark in Suzhou.

== Design ==
The square can be divided into 5 functional regions, including business, recreation, catering and so on. The most notable spotlight is the 500-meter long LED screen above the walkway, the Suzhou Sky Screen currently the world's largest video screen. The screen consists of 20 million LEDs. Jiuguang Department Store is the biggest store there.

== Transportation ==
There are several bus lines and Line 1 of the Suzhou Metro (Times Square Station) near the Harmony Times Square. Parking space is also enough for drivers. Also, there are several overline bridges across the river, connecting the east and the west bank. Stores are grouped by their functions to make it easier for the customer to find what they want.
