= Michigan station (Detroit) =

Detroit People Mover station

Michigan
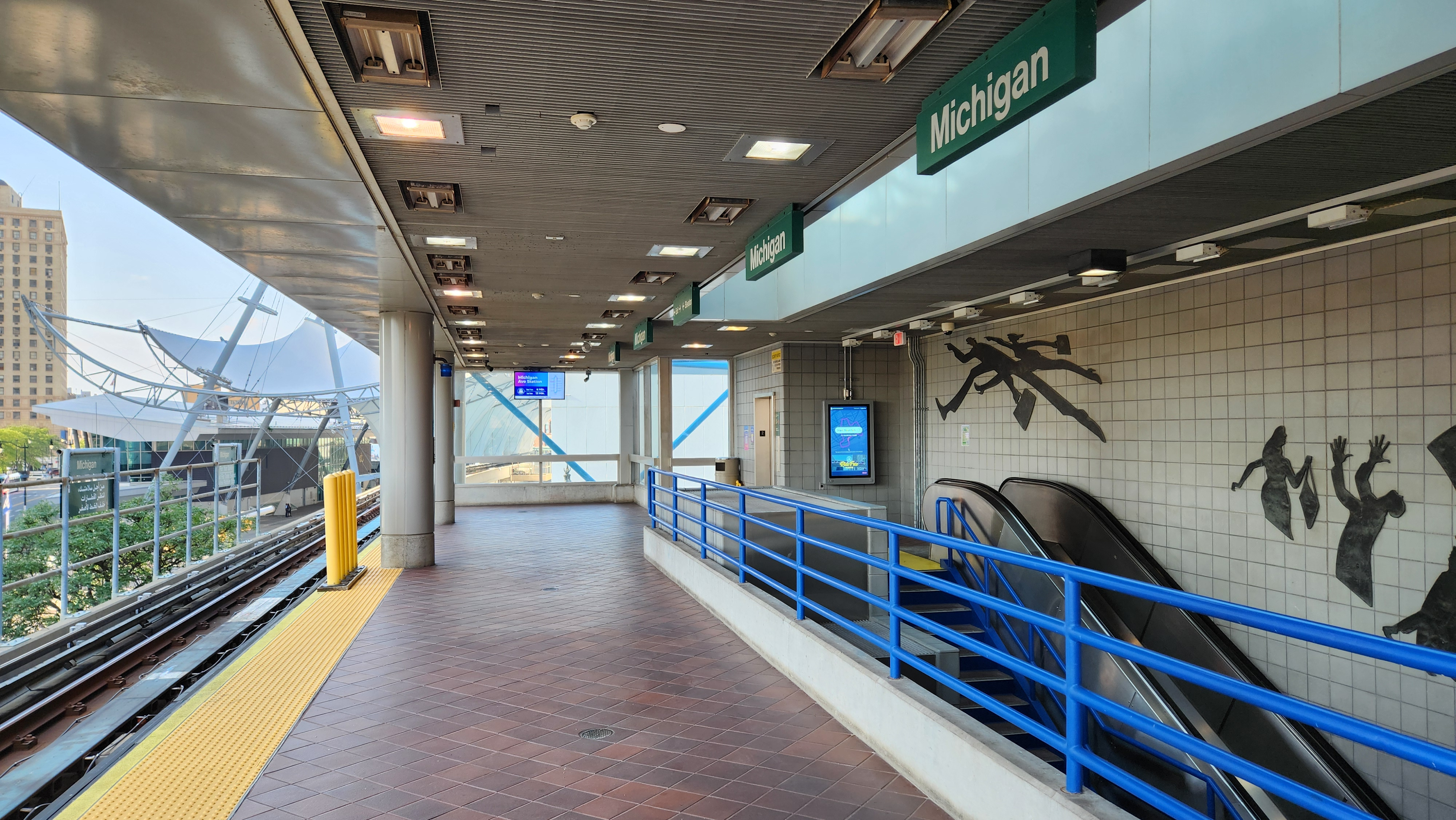
- Station platform

General information
- Location: 1220 Cass Avenue; Detroit, Michigan 48226
- Coordinates: 42°19′53″N 83°03′08″W
- Owner: Detroit Transportation Corporation
- Platforms: 1 side platform
- Tracks: 1
- Connections: DDOT 3, 6 SMART FAST Michigan, Woodward; SMART 255, 530, 620, 635, 805, 830, 851; Detroit Air Xpress; Rosa Parks Transit Center: DDOT 1, 2, 4, 5, 9, 16, 18, 19, 23, 27, 29, 31, 40, 52, 67

Construction
- Structure type: Elevated
- Accessible: yes

History
- Opened: July 31, 1987

Passengers
- 2014: 148,979
- Rank: 5 out of 13

Services
Preceding station	Detroit People Mover	Following station
Times Square One-way operation	Detroit People Mover	Fort/Cass Next counter-clockwise
Location

Michigan station is a Detroit People Mover station in downtown Detroit, Michigan. It is located at the corner of Michigan and Cass Avenues, across the street from the Rosa Parks Transit Center, the main downtown hub of the Detroit Department of Transportation bus network.

Michigan is the nearest People Mover station to American Coney Island and Lafayette Coney Island, the Patrick V. McNamara Federal Building, Westin Book Cadillac Hotel, and Detroit Public Safety Headquarters.

== See also ==
- List of rapid transit systems
- List of United States rapid transit systems by ridership
- Transportation in metropolitan Detroit
