= Times Square (Detroit) =

Street and former town square in Michigan

- Length: 0.16 mi (0.26 km)
- South end: Cass Avenue in Detroit
- North end: Clifford Street in Detroit

Times Square is a street and former town square in downtown Detroit, Michigan. The street itself formed the western boundary of the square, which was also bounded by East Park Place to the east and State Street to the south. The square and the street both took their names from the Detroit Times newspaper, whose building stood directly west of the square. Since that building's demolition, the remaining prominent buildings that face the former square are those that make up the AT&T Michigan Headquarters, along with the Times Square Detroit People Mover station, which houses the Detroit People Mover Operations and Maintenance Facilities.

The square was removed to make way for the Rosa Parks Transit Center, which opened in the summer of 2009, and replaced Capitol Park as the Detroit Department of Transportation's main downtown hub.
