= MGM Grand Detroit =

Casino resort hotel in Detroit, Michigan

Coordinates: 42°20′1″N 83°3′37″W

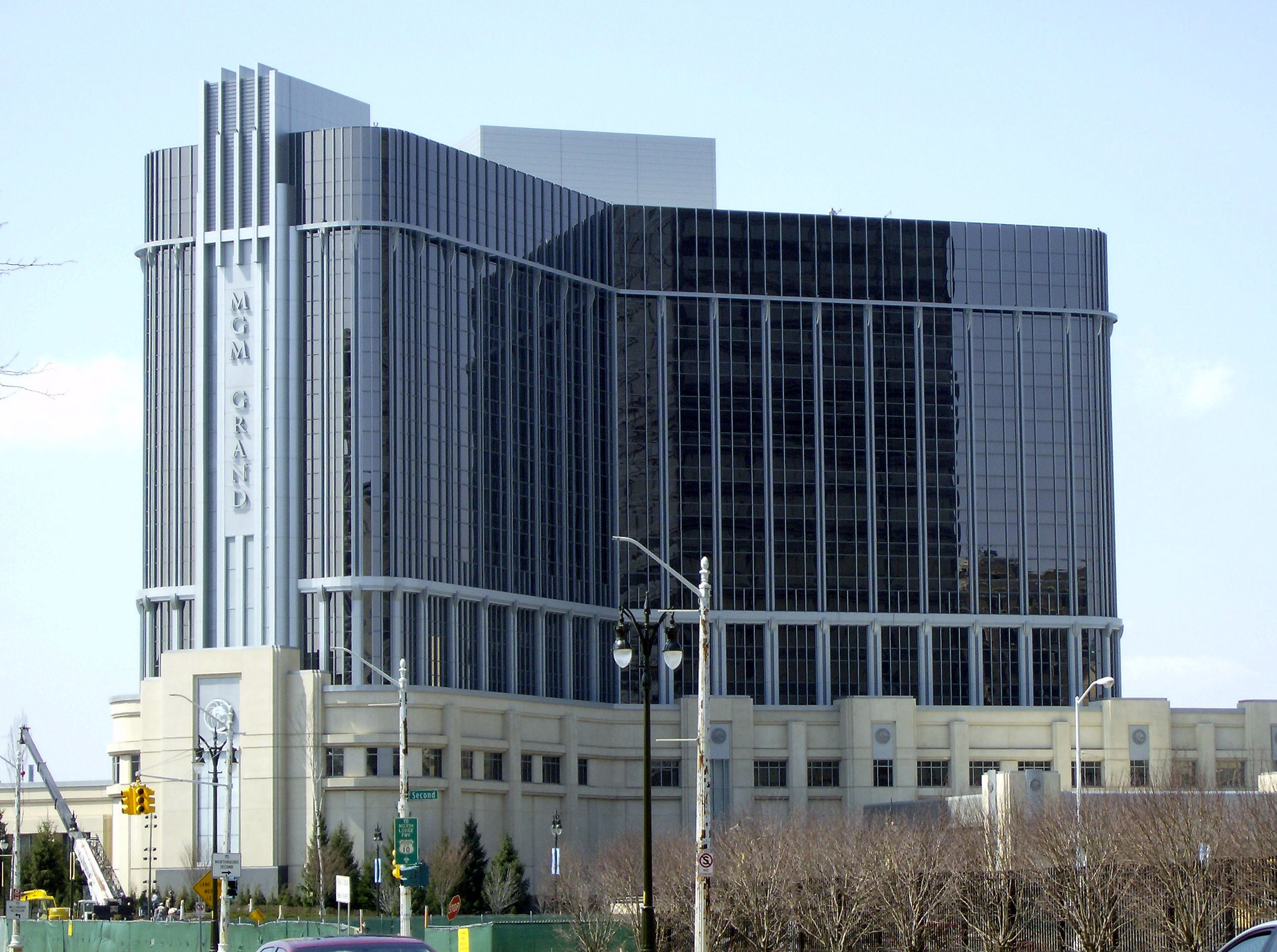
- MGM Grand Detroit in 2008
- Interactive map of MGM Grand Detroit
- Location: 1777 Third Street Detroit, Michigan, U.S. 48226
- Opened: July 29, 1999; 27 years ago (as temporary casino); October 3, 2007; 19 years ago (as permanent luxury resort)
- Theme: Art Deco
- No. of rooms: 401
- Gaming space: 100,000 sq ft
- Permanent shows: 1,200-seat theatre
- Signature attractions: Upscale shopping VIP Night Club
- Notable restaurants: Palette Dining Studio; D.PRIME Steakhouse; Detroit Central Market; TAP
- Casino type: Land-based
- Owner: Vici Properties
- Operating license holder: MGM Resorts International
- Website: www.mgmgranddetroit.com

The MGM Grand Detroit is one of three casino resort hotels in Detroit, Michigan, United States, and one of four in the Detroit–Windsor area. It is owned by Vici Properties and operated by MGM Resorts International. The casino opened in its temporary location on July 29, 1999. The permanent, luxury resort hotel opened on October 3, 2007, with a grand event which included models and celebrities including Ashanti, Kid Rock, and fireworks.

Detroit is one of the largest American cities and metropolitan regions to offer casino resort hotels.

== History ==
In July 1999, MGM Grand Detroit opened the first legal casino in Detroit. Built in a renovated Internal Revenue Service office, it cost $235 million and was slated to be replaced in four years by an $800 million permanent gambling resort.

In August 2002, MGM Grand Detroit acquired 25 acres of nearby property for an undisclosed price from DTE Energy.

In 2005, the MGM Grand Detroit Casino was the subject of a possible sale when parent company MGM MIRAGE announced that it was acquiring rival casino company Mandalay Resort Group, owners of the MotorCity Casino. Due to Michigan state gaming laws prohibiting casino owners from acquiring or owning more than one casino in the state, MGM Mirage was forced to sell either the MGM Grand Detroit or the MotorCity casino. MGM MIRAGE had several serious buyers for the MGM Grand Detroit, but ultimately sold the MotorCity Casino to Marian Ilitch.

On December 13, 2005, the Michigan Gaming Control Board approved MGM Grand's plans for a permanent casino with 100,000 square feet (9,300 m^{2}) of casino space, 401 hotel rooms, and an eight-story self-parking garage to be located on John C. Lodge Freeway and Bagley Street, three to four blocks from the temporary casino. The facility has 30,000 square feet (2,800 m^{2}) of meeting space for conferences and live performance seating for 1,200. The Casino also rebuilt 3rd Street into a two way boulevard to facilitate traffic movement around the site.

The permanent casino opened to the public on October 3, 2007. The grand opening celebration attracted Hollywood stars. A Celebrity Poker Match was taped there for a televised release at a later date. The MGM Grand Detroit stands across from the DTE Energy Headquarters which includes a reflecting pool and landscaped areas.

Designers on the project include the joint venture of Hamilton Anderson Associates and the SmithGroup, both of Detroit, Cleo Design of Las Vegas, Carol Harris of Detroit, Lawrence Lee of California, Toni Chi of New York, and Super Potato out of Japan. The lead architects were Paul Tonti of the SmithGroup and Thomas Sherry of Hamilton Anderson Associates. In 2007, DTE Energy announced a major transformation of the area around its downtown headquarters into an urban oasis with parks, walkways, and a reflecting pool adjacent to the MGM Grand Detroit.

Just across the river, Caesars Windsor attracts about six million visitors annually. More than fifteen million people cross the Ambassador Bridge and the Detroit–Windsor Tunnel annually. An estimated 46 million people live within a 300-mile (480 km) radius of Metro Detroit. Since 2000, the city has seen continuous annual increases in tax revenues from its casinos; the city estimated that it would collect $178.25 million in casino taxes alone for 2007, with the casino resorts open in 2008.

Ownership of MGM Grand Detroit, along with many other MGM properties, was transferred in 2016 to MGM Growth Properties (which was later acquired by Vici Properties in 2022), while MGM Resorts continued to operate it under a lease agreement.

On May 18, 2017, after performing at Fox Theatre the evening prior, Chris Cornell, frontman of the grunge band Soundgarden was found lying unconscious on the bathroom floor of room 1136 with an exercise band around his neck and blood in his mouth. Unable to be resuscitated, officials ruled Cornell's death as suicide by hanging.

== See also ==
- Hollywood Casino at Greektown
- Wikimedia graph of Detroit's casino revenues
- List of integrated resorts
