= Executive Plaza Building (Detroit) =

Building in Michigan, United States

Coordinates: 42.3283°N 83.0590°W

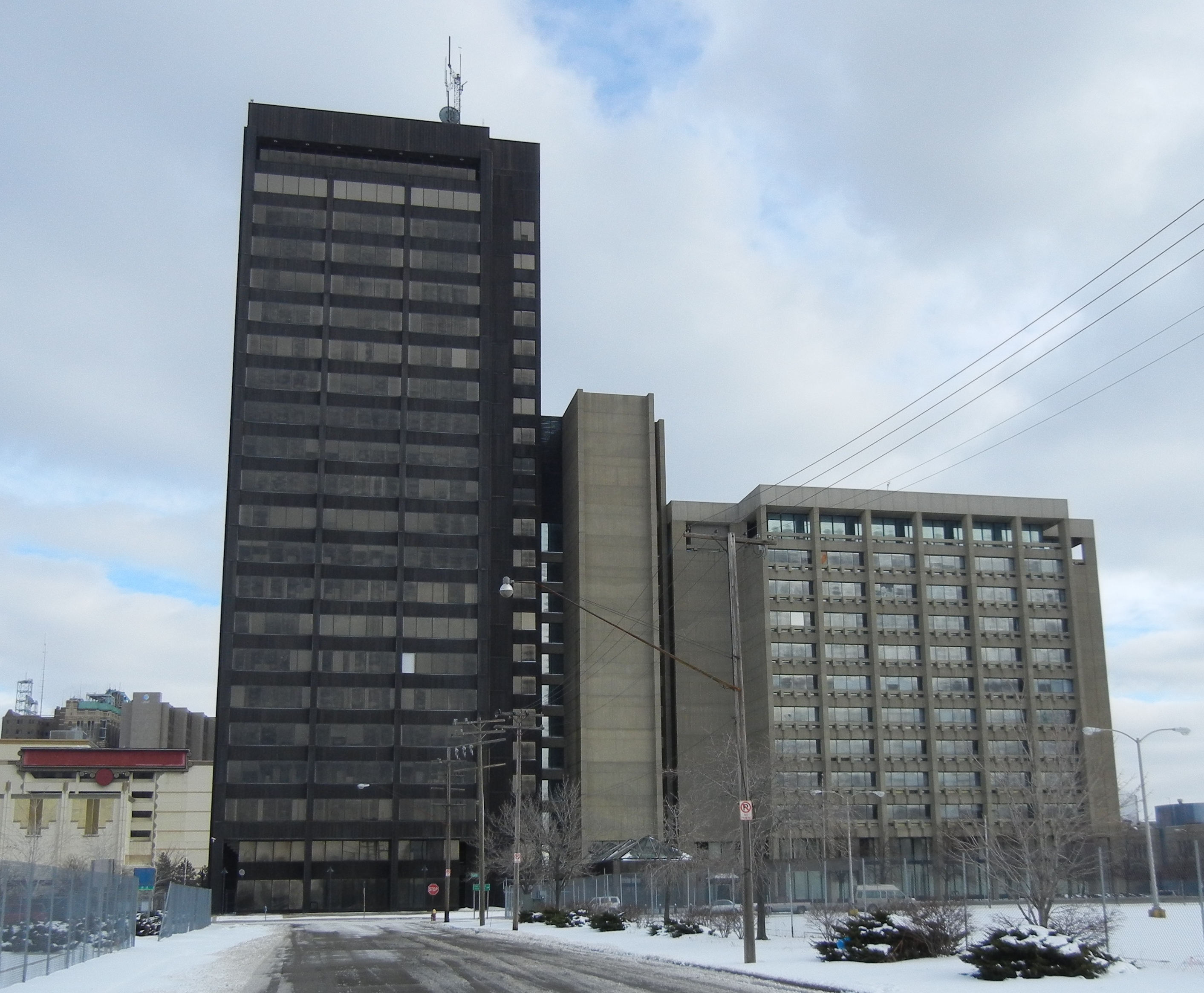
Executive Plaza Building

The Executive Plaza Building is a two-tower office building that was constructed between 1967 and 1975 in Detroit, Michigan, United States. The taller building stands 22 stories high on a lot bounded by Sixth Street, Howard, Abbott and the John C. Lodge Freeway. The address is 1200 Sixth Street.

The first tower was constructed at the southern portion of the site in 1967 and is 11 stories. It is faced with precast concrete panels with protruding piers dividing the window bays. The corners of the building are recessed as are the windows of the top floor allowing for a small terraced area on three sides. Elevators and stairs are housed in a separate tower at the north end. It was originally conceived as the Detroit Trade Center but was purchased by the State of Michigan as an office building. The State of Michigan maintained its offices in this building until 2002 when all agencies moved to Cadillac Place.

In 1974, the State added the high-rise which was constructed in a style which combined the international and black box styles. It was designed by the firm of Jickling, Lyman & Powell and is faced with reflective glass and brown aluminum panels causing it to resemble the nearby DTE Energy Headquarters. Like the first tower, the windows of the top floor are recessed, and its elevators and stairs are contained in a tower adjoining the elevator tower of the earlier structure.

The state sold the property in 2003 for $12.5 million to a real estate investment group.

In May 2006, the General Services Administration (GSA) announced it would acquire the site and raze the current buildings to construct new offices for the Detroit branch of the FBI. However, by July 2010 the GSA announced that the plan had been canceled because it was unable to reach an agreement with the building's current owner.

Owners placed the building up for auction in 2014 with a minimum bid request of $4.5 million but received no offers.

In August 2025, Southfield, Michigan-based real estate firm Blackacre Management acquired the long-vacant complex for $5 million. Blackacre announced plans to convert the building from office use into a mixed-use development with residential and hotel components, proposing approximately 350 apartments and a 114-room hotel. The firm subsequently sought a tax abatement for the conversion.
