= Detroit Times =

Multiple newspapers in Detroit, Michigan

Six different newspapers called the Detroit Times have been published in the city of Detroit; the most recent existed for six decades, from 1900 to 1960.

== Overview ==
- The first iteration of the Detroit Times was an antislavery bulletin only printed from May to November 1842 by Warren Isham.
- The second iteration began in November 1854. Published by G.S. Conklin and E.T. Sherlock, with John N. Ingersoll as editor. The paper was purchased that same month by Ingersoll and Tenny, and sold again in December 1855, to an association of journeyman printers, who published the paper until the spring of 1856.
- The third version was established in April 1881; it was likely discontinued before the end of 1881 after being bought by The Sunday Herald.
- The fourth Detroit Times, a daily and Sunday, was printed from December 4, 1883 to February 26, 1885 at 47 West Larned Street and was run by a stock company. The paper's managers were Charles Moore, Charles M. Parker, D. J. McDonald and Frank E. Robinson. A fire on the morning of April 11, 1884 completely destroyed the printing plant; with the assistance of the other Detroit printing establishments, the edition was printed without interruption. Lloyd Breeze purchased the paper November 22, 1884; the paper was suspended on February 26, 1885.
- Five years later, James E. Scripps, owner of The Detroit News, set out to prove a point: he started the fifth version of the Detroit Times and sold it for a penny a copy. After printing it for 18 months and proving he could make a profit selling a newspaper for a penny, Scripps merged the Times into the News.

== Sixth and final version ==
The sixth and most recent version (to date) of the Detroit Times was published as an evening paper from 1900 until November 6, 1960. The Times was brought back to life by James Schermerhorn October 1, 1900 as Detroit Today but quickly changed its name to the Evening Times. The paper was purchased, after the property was placed in the hands of a receiver, by William Randolph Hearst in the later part of 1921.

At the time Hearst purchased the Times it was located at 131 Bagley Street; Hearst wasted no time working out plans for a new state-of-the-art printing plant. With the backing of Hearst, who dispatched famed editor Arthur Brisbane to Detroit to kickstart the new management, the Times became the fastest-growing paper in the city, rivaling The Detroit News and the Detroit Free Press in the great Detroit newspaper war. The growth in circulation demanded a bigger building, so Hearst commissioned Albert Kahn as architect and the new Art Deco home of the Detroit Times was dedicated on December 6, 1929. The Times hit its highest circulation in 1951, with an average daily high of 438,757 papers sold.

But the 1950s were not kind to the newspaper business, and the Times' circulation numbers slipped to about 400,000 copies sold daily by 1960. Rumors of a sale of the Times had been circulating for weeks, then on the evening of Sunday, November 6, 1960, Newsweek magazine broke the story with the headline,"One Out In Detroit," explaining that Hearst's "limping" paper had been sold to The Evening News Association, owner of its "independently owned, well-heeled competitor," The Detroit News. Reports of the sale also appeared that evening on Detroit radio station WXYZ (now WXYT) as well as in the early "bulldog" edition of the Detroit Free Press.

The Free Press reported at the time that only one person at the Times, General Manager William H. Mills, knew of the imminence of the sale, and that H.G. Kern, general manager of the Hearst chain, had informed Mills of the completion of the sale as early as Friday, November 4, instructing him to only inform the employees on Monday morning.

The Times' 1,500 employees were given little notice: They received termination telegrams at two in the morning on Monday, November 7, mere hours before they would begin reporting for work. The telegrams stated the following: "It is with deep regret that the management of the Detroit Times must inform you of termination of your services as of the opening of business on Nov. 7, 1960. It is not necessary for you to report for further duty. Your paycheck will be available on your usual payday in the Detroit Times lobby. The chief accountant has been instructed to mail you a check as soon as possible for any monies that may be due you under the collective bargaining agreement between the Detroit Times and the Guild." The telegrams offered no explanations for the terminations. Employees were only informed that the building was locked and there were armed guards around it. A week or so later employees could return to clear their desks, accompanied by those armed guards. The news of the sale was delivered to the newsroom staff in the middle of the night, at approximately 3am on Monday, November 7. They were nearly finished with that day's first edition of the Times, but were given the news, told to stop what they were doing and to leave the premises, making the Sunday, November 6, 1960 edition the final ever for the Detroit Times.

On Monday, November 7, the day after reports of the sale began to surface, and the day after the unannounced final edition of the Times, The News and Hearst released a joint statement reporting the sale as a merger. The $10 million deal included the Times, its building, its presses, all physical assets, distribution rights and subscription lists. That same day, The News began showing the Times' masthead below theirs, displaying, "The Detroit News - including the best features from the Detroit Times," meaning that even as former Times workers were still trying to absorb the shock of the news they had just received that morning, Times subscribers would begin receiving deliveries of The News - featuring the Times masthead - later that afternoon.

In reality, very few of the Times staff were offered jobs with the "merged" paper, as it was no merger. The News had in fact, purchased the Times, closed it down in the middle of the night with no advance warning, locked down its building, and fired its employees. Many of the Times' pressmen, stereotypers, paper handlers, machinists, electricians and mailers were offered jobs printing The News. The News also offered all Times carriers jobs. The biggest names amongst the Times reporters were cherry-picked for positions with the expanding operations of the News, as well as the rival Detroit Free Press. About 400 of the Guild members at the Times were sent scrambling for jobs at out-of-town papers, or left to find jobs in different industries.

Hearst executives expressed "regret at leaving Detroit" after nearly 40 years, but said that, much like the current troubling era for print journalism, "the Times has been beset by the same basic problems confronting so many other metropolitan newspapers," and that circulation and advertising were not rising to match the cost of doing business. The Times reportedly had lost $10 million in the previous five years.

The prevailing opinion of the sale was that the Hearst papers, which were in financial trouble, sold the Detroit Times because it was one of the few properties that anyone wanted to buy. On November 11, The News began using the presses of the Times to help with its huge bump in circulation. Before The News bought the Times, its daily circulation was around 525,000 and 740,000 on Sunday. After the sale, The News was printing 900,000 copies daily and 1.2 million on Sundays. (The first such Sunday run, on November 13, 1960, broke the record for largest print run in the history of Detroit.) About 300,000 of the 900,000 daily copies and 200,000 of the Sunday copies were printed on the Times' presses. This acquisition is a major reason why for many years, The Detroit News could boast beneath its masthead of having "The Largest Evening Circulation In America," which was eventually downsized to "Michigan's Largest Newspaper." That lasted until The News was overtaken in daily circulation by the rival Free Press.

The News would continue to use the Times' presses along with its own until 1975, when it opened a new, state-of-the art printing plant in Sterling Heights, Michigan, that replaced both, and published The News, and the rival Free Press (due to a joint operating agreement, which ran from 1989-2025.) The Times building was demolished in 1978. The area where the Times was located is still called Times Square, although the Square itself was removed to make way for the Rosa Parks Transit Center in 2009.

The Detroit Times should not be confused with the Detroit Metro Times, the original name of the weekly Metro Times.

== See also ==
- List of defunct newspapers of the United States
